= Kawasakishimmachi Station =

Railway station in Kawasaki, Kanagawa Prefecture, Japan

JN52 Kawasakishimmachi Station 川崎新町駅
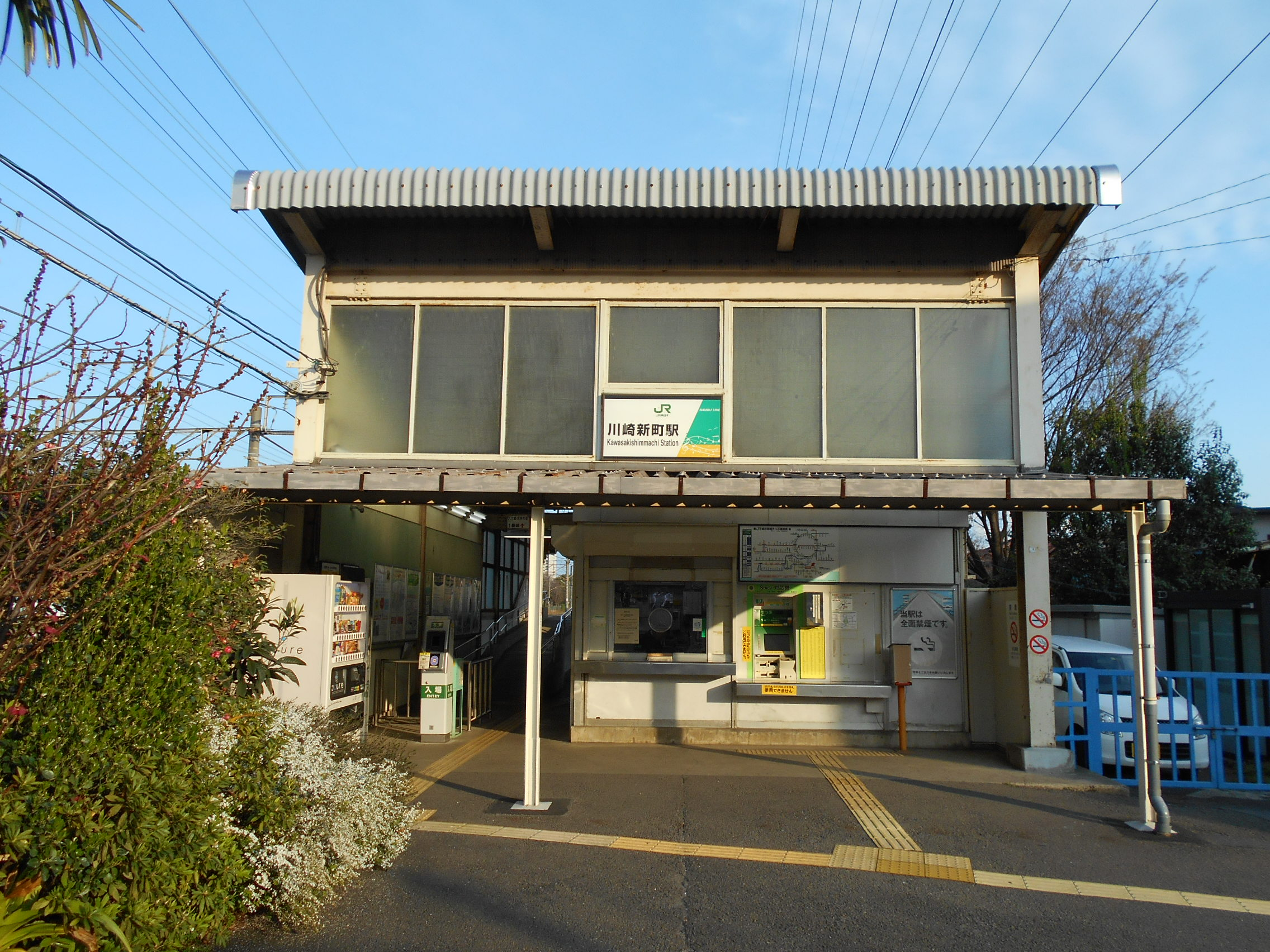
- The station building and entrance in March 2016

General information
- Location: Watarida-Sannōchō; Kawasaki-ku, Kawasaki; Japan
- Coordinates: 35°31′06″N 139°41′58″E
- Operator: JR East
- Line: Nambu Branch Line
- Distance: 2.2 km (1.4 mi) from Shitte
- Platforms: 2 side platforms
- Tracks: 4

Construction
- Structure type: At-grade

Other information
- Station code: JN52
- Website: Official website

History
- Opened: 25 March 1930

Passengers
- FY2019: 3,009 daily

Services
Preceding station	JR East	Following station
Hatchōnawate JN51 towards Shitte	Nambu Branch Line	Odasakae JN53 towards Hama-Kawasaki
Location
- Location within Japan

Kawasakishimmachi Station (Japanese: 川崎新町駅, Hepburn: Kawasaki-Shinmachi-eki) is a passenger railway station located in Kawasaki-ku, Kawasaki, Kanagawa Prefecture, Japan, operated by East Japan Railway Company (JR East).

== Lines ==
Kawasakishimmachi Station is served by the 4.1 km Nambu Branch Line from Shitte to Hama-Kawasaki, and lies 2.0 kilometers from the starting point of the line at Shitte.

== Station layout ==
The station building and entrance is located on the south side of the tracks, with direct access to the up (Shitte-bound) platform 1. The down (Hama-Kawasaki-bound) platform 2 is accessed via an underpass. The station is staffed with simple Suica touch points at the entrance rather than ticket barriers. The station is staffed.

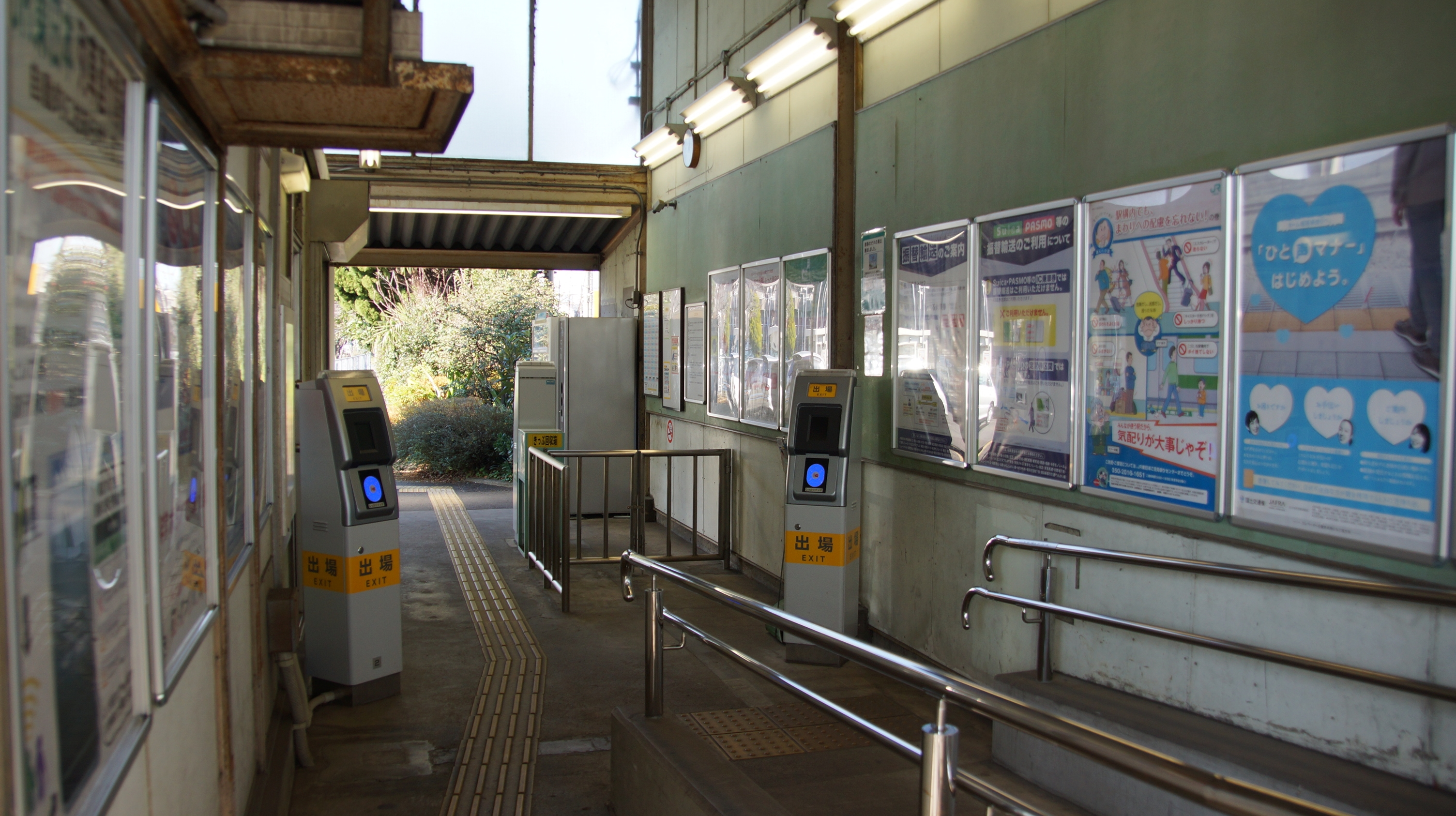
The Suica touch points at the entrance in January 2016

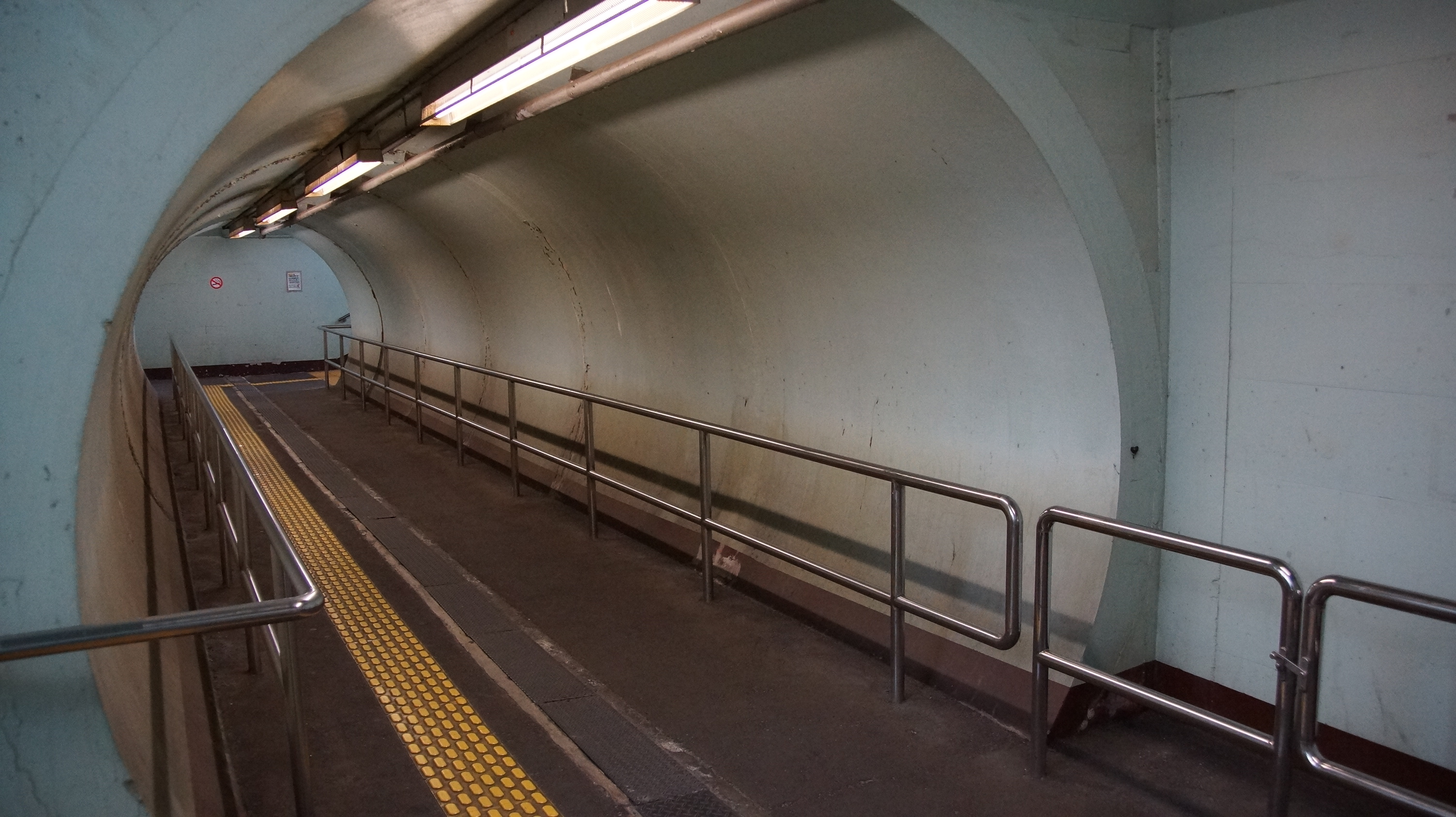
The tunnel leading to platform 2 in January 2016

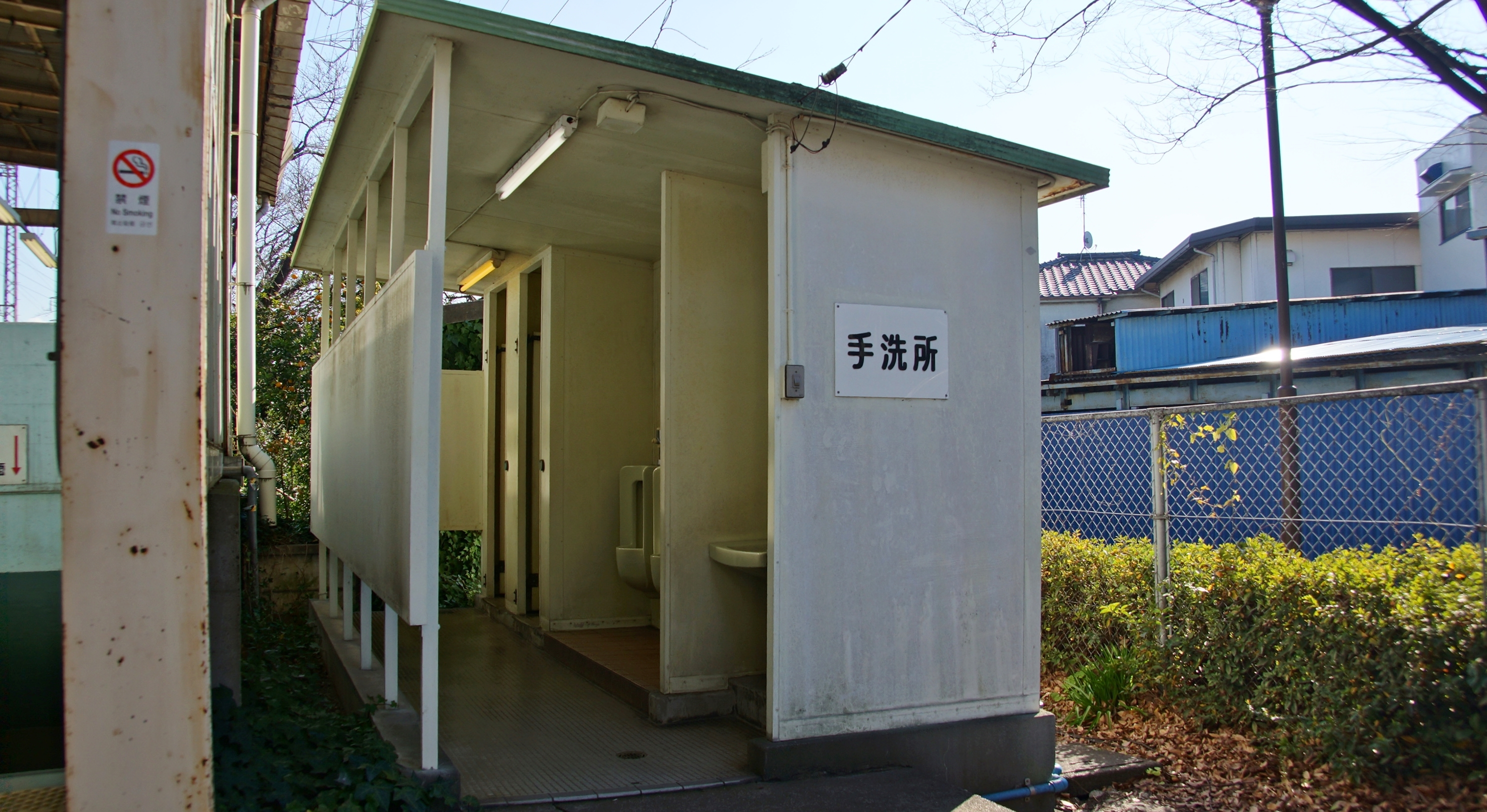
The station toilets in January 2016

=== Platforms ===
Platform 1 is a side platform used by Nambu Branch Line up services to Shitte and also by freight services on the Tokaido Freight Branch Line accessing the Tokaido Line at Tsurumi. The adjacent track (behind platform 2) is the up (Tokyo-bound) track of the Tokaido Freight Branch Line. An additional loop line lies on the north side of the station.

1	Nambu Branch Line	for Shitte
2	Nambu Branch Line	for Hama-Kawasaki

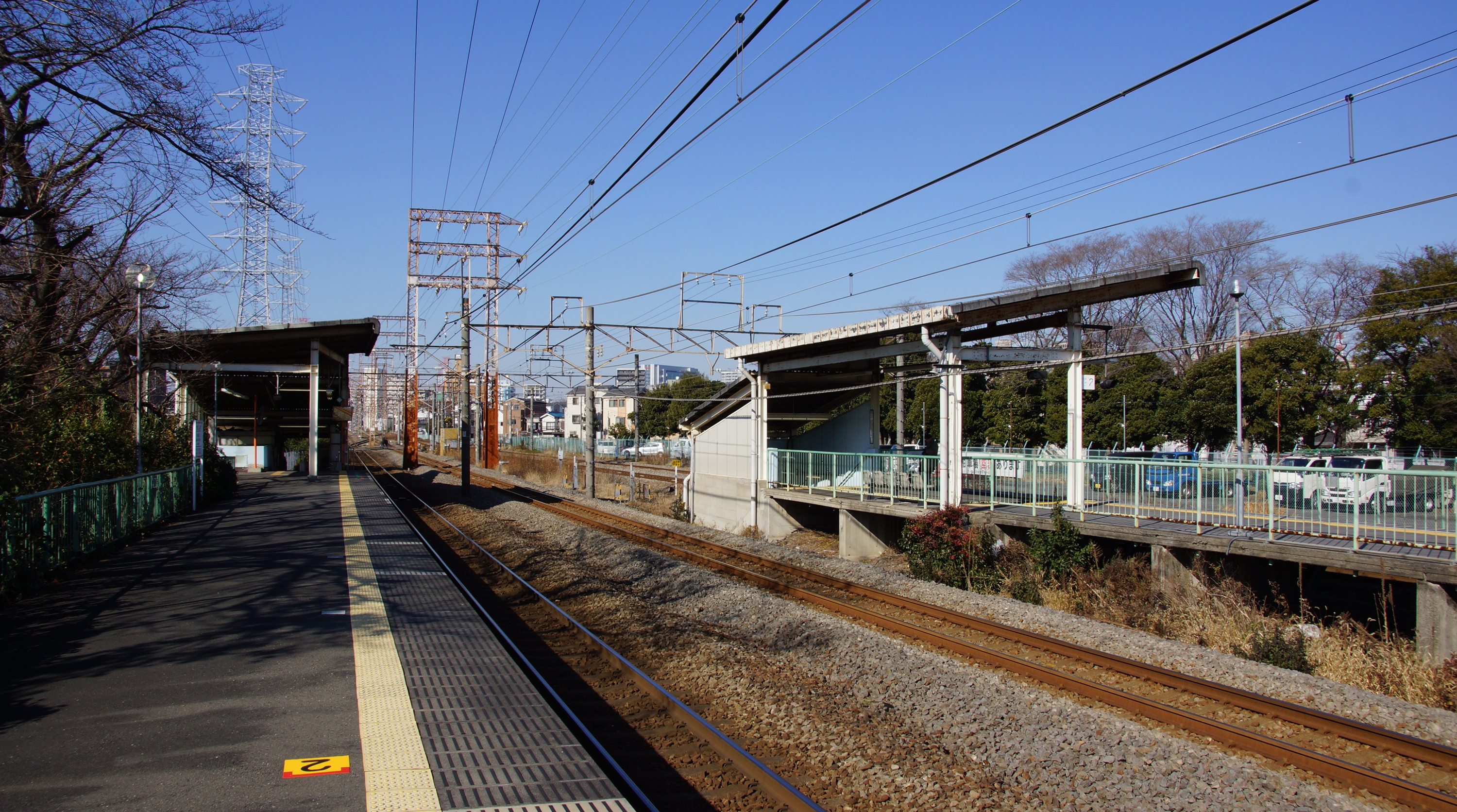
The view looking north from platform 1, with the up Tokaido Freight Branch Line on the right and platform 2 on the far right

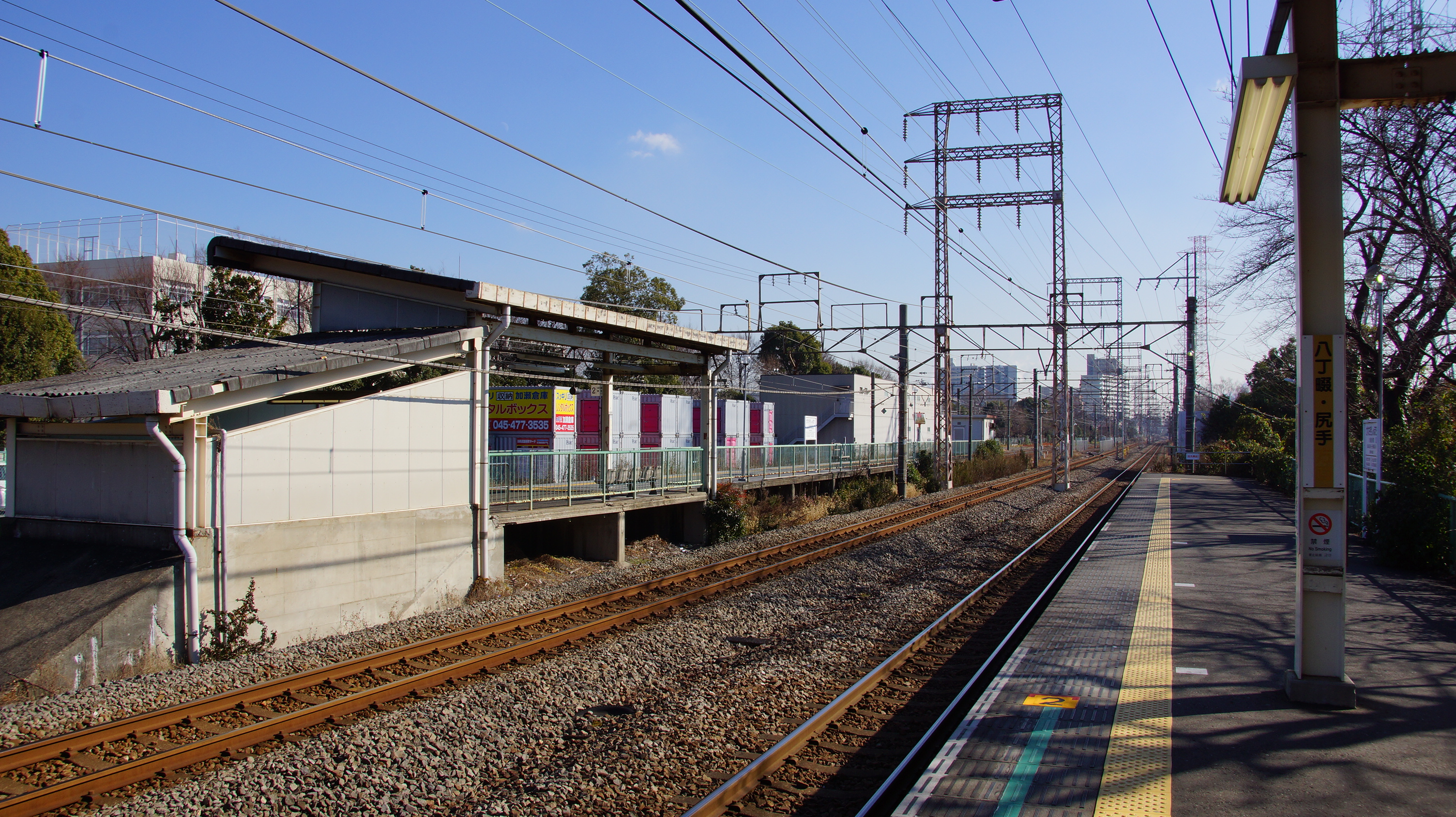
The view looking east from platform 1, with platform 2 on the left

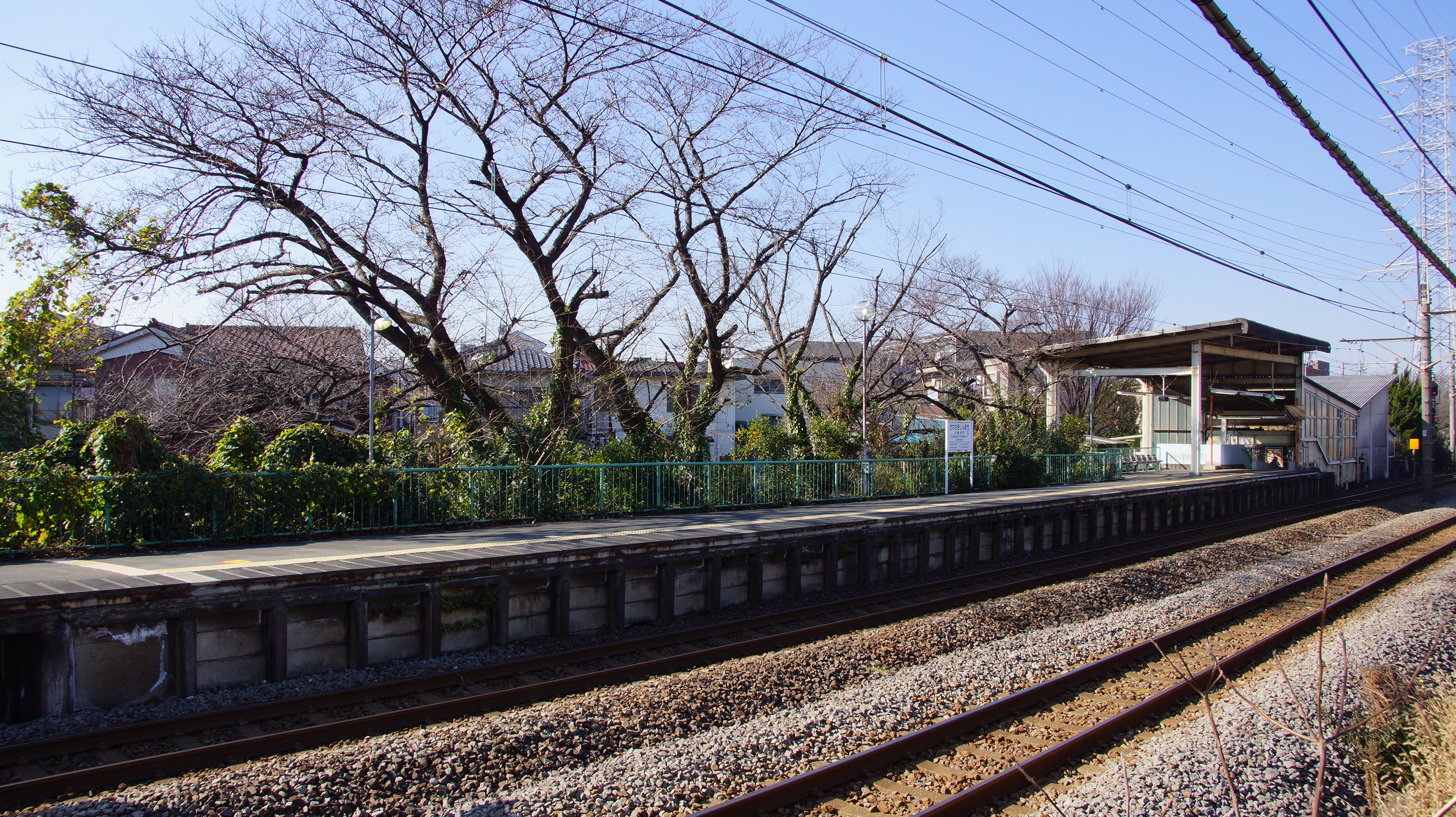
Platform 1 as view from platform 2 in January 2016

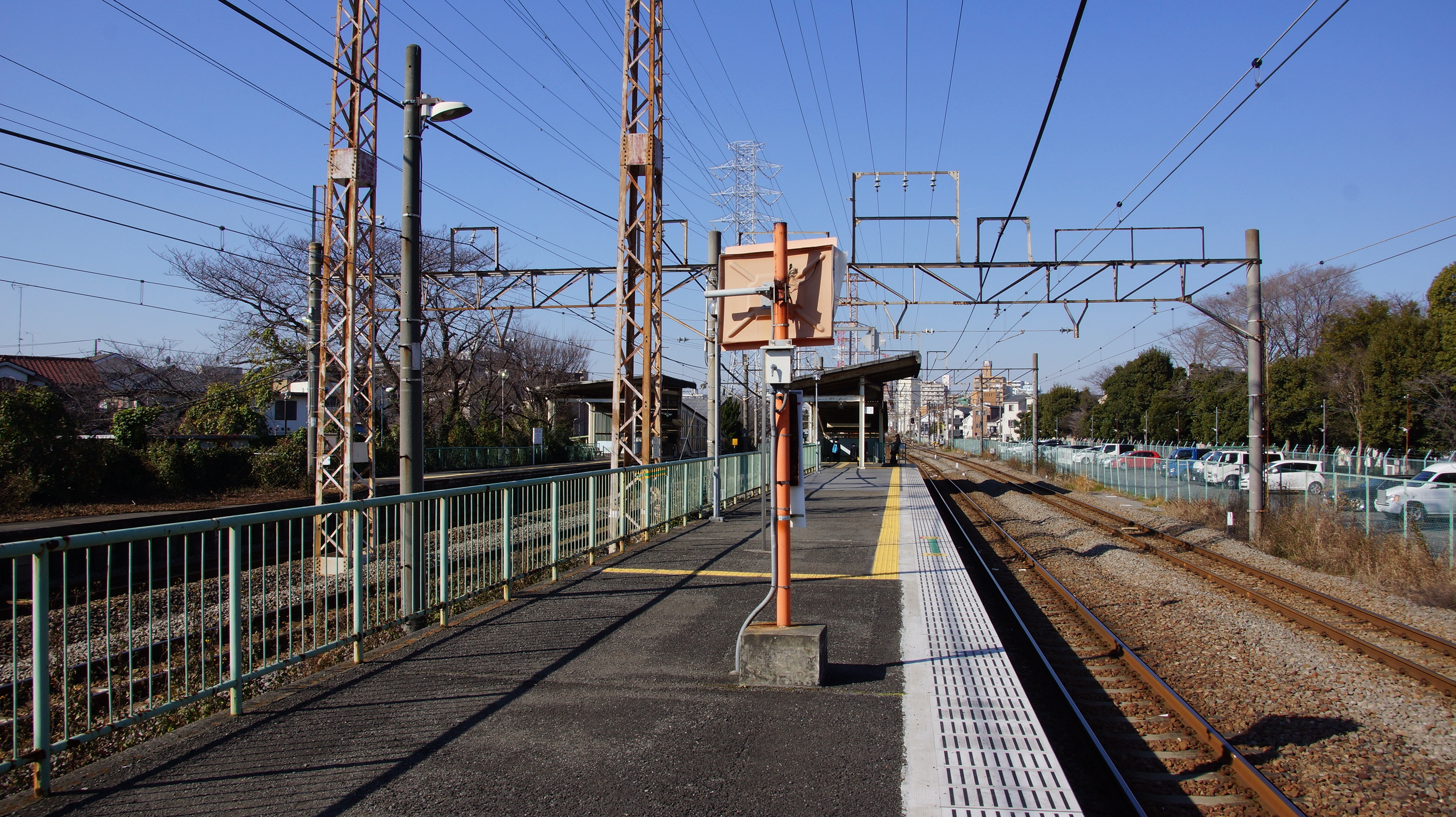
The view from the Hama-Kawasaki end of platform 2 in January 2016

== History ==
Kawasakishimmachi Station opened on March 25, 1930, initially as a freight-only station on the Nambu Railway's Nambu Branch Line. Passenger services began on April 10, 1930. The Nambu Railway was nationalized on April 1, 1944, becoming part of the Japanese Government Railway (JGR) system, at which time freight services at the station were discontinued. The JGR became the Japanese National Railways (JNR) from 1949.

With the privatization of JNR on April 1, 1987, the station came under the control of JR East.

== Passenger statistics ==
In fiscal 2019, the station was used by an average of 3,009 passengers daily (boarding passengers only). The passenger figures for previous years are as shown below.

Fiscal year	Daily average
2000	1,003
2005	1,069
2010	1,348
2015	1,461

== Surrounding area ==
- Kanagawa Prefectural Kawasaki High School
- Kawasaki Watarida Junior High School
- Kawasaki Shinmachi Elementary School

== See also ==
- List of railway stations in Japan
