= Shōwa Station =

Shōwa Station may refer to:

- Shōwa Station (Kanagawa), a train station in Kawasaki, Kanagawa, Japan
- Showa Station (Antarctica), an Antarctic research station
