= Odasakae Station =

Railway station in Kawasaki, Kanagawa Prefecture, Japan

JN53 Odasakae Station 小田栄駅
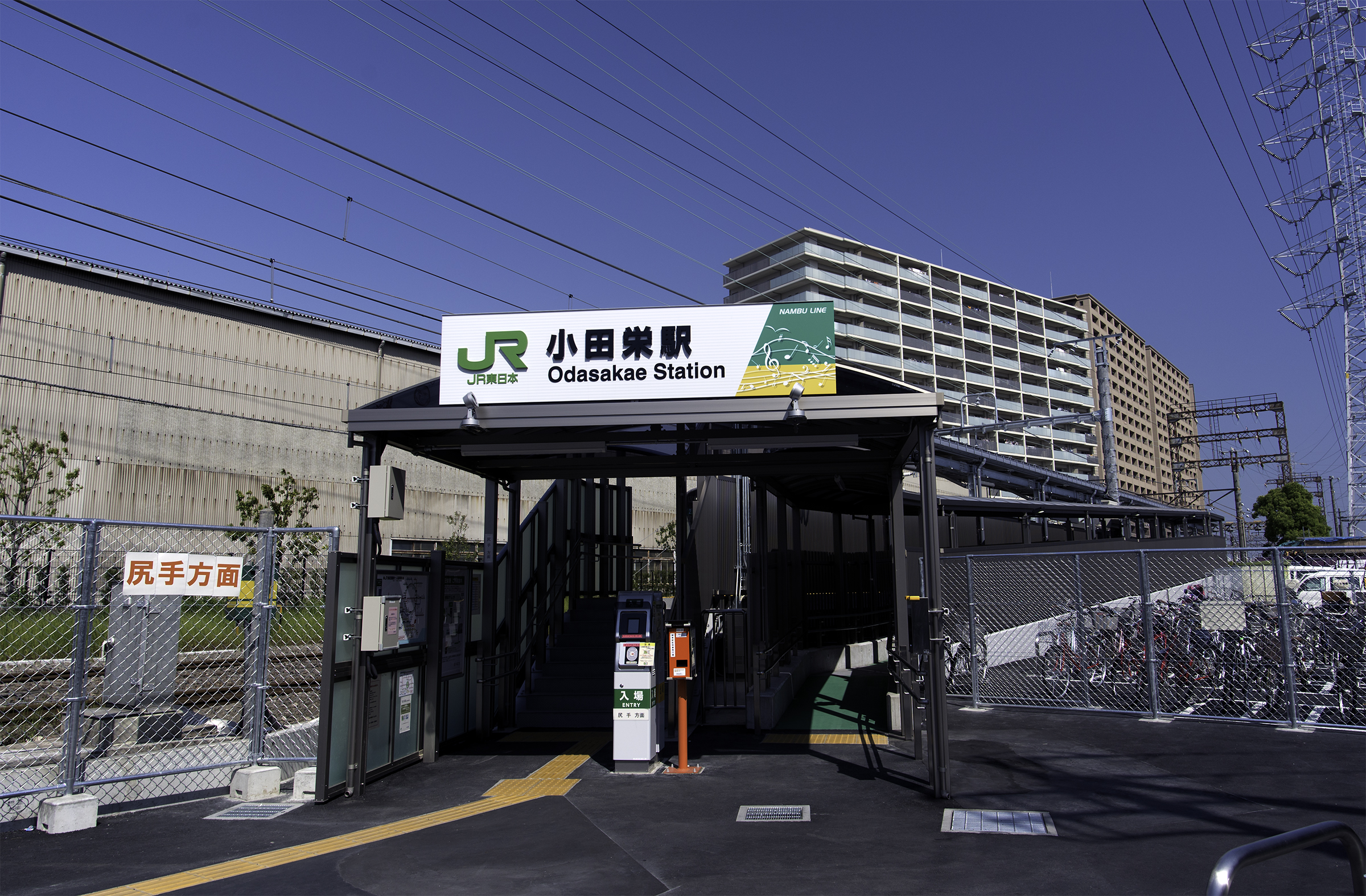
- The entrance to the Shitte-bound platform (platform 2) in March 2016

General information
- Location: Odasakae, Kawasaki-ku, Kawasaki-shi, Kanagawa-ken 210-0843; Japan
- Coordinates: 35°30′52.2″N 139°42′17.8″E
- Operator: JR East
- Line: Nambu Branch Line
- Distance: 2.7 km from Shitte
- Platforms: 2 side platforms
- Tracks: 2

Other information
- Status: Unstaffed
- Station code: JN 53
- Website: Official website

History
- Opened: 26 March 2016

Passengers
- 3,500 daily (forecast)

Services
Preceding station	JR East	Following station
Kawasakishimmachi JN52 towards Shitte	Nambu Branch Line	Hama-Kawasaki JN54 Terminus
Location
- Location within Kanagawa Prefecture Location within Japan

Odasakae Station (小田栄駅, Odasakae-eki) is a passenger railway station located in Kawasaki-ku, Kawasaki, Kanagawa Prefecture, Japan, operated by East Japan Railway Company (JR East).

== Lines ==
Odasakae Station is served by the 4.1 km Nambu Branch Line between Shitte and Hama-Kawasaki. Located between Kawasaki-Shinmachi and Hama-Kawasaki, it is 2.7 km from the starting point of the line at Shitte.

== Station layout ==
The station consists of two side platforms approximately 50 m long serving two tracks on the otherwise single-track line. The platforms are separated by the Odasakae level crossing, with the down (Hama-Kawasaki-bound) platform located on the north-west (Shitte) side, and the up (Shitte-bound) platform on the south-east (Hama-Kawasaki) side.

=== Platforms ===
1	Nambu Branch Line	for Hama-Kawasaki
2	Nambu Branch Line	for Shitte

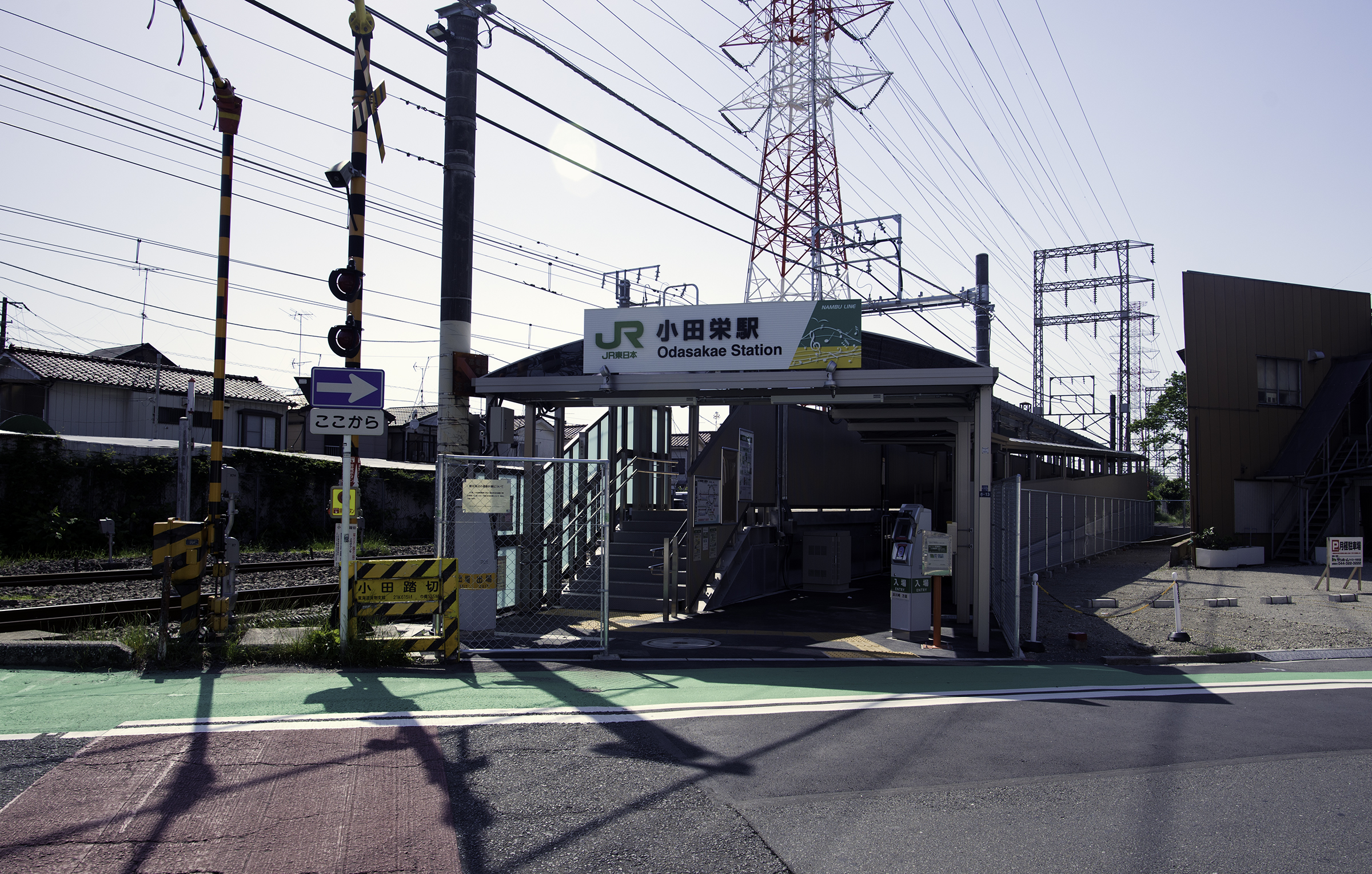
The entrance to the Hama-Kawasaki-bound platform (platform 1) in March 2016

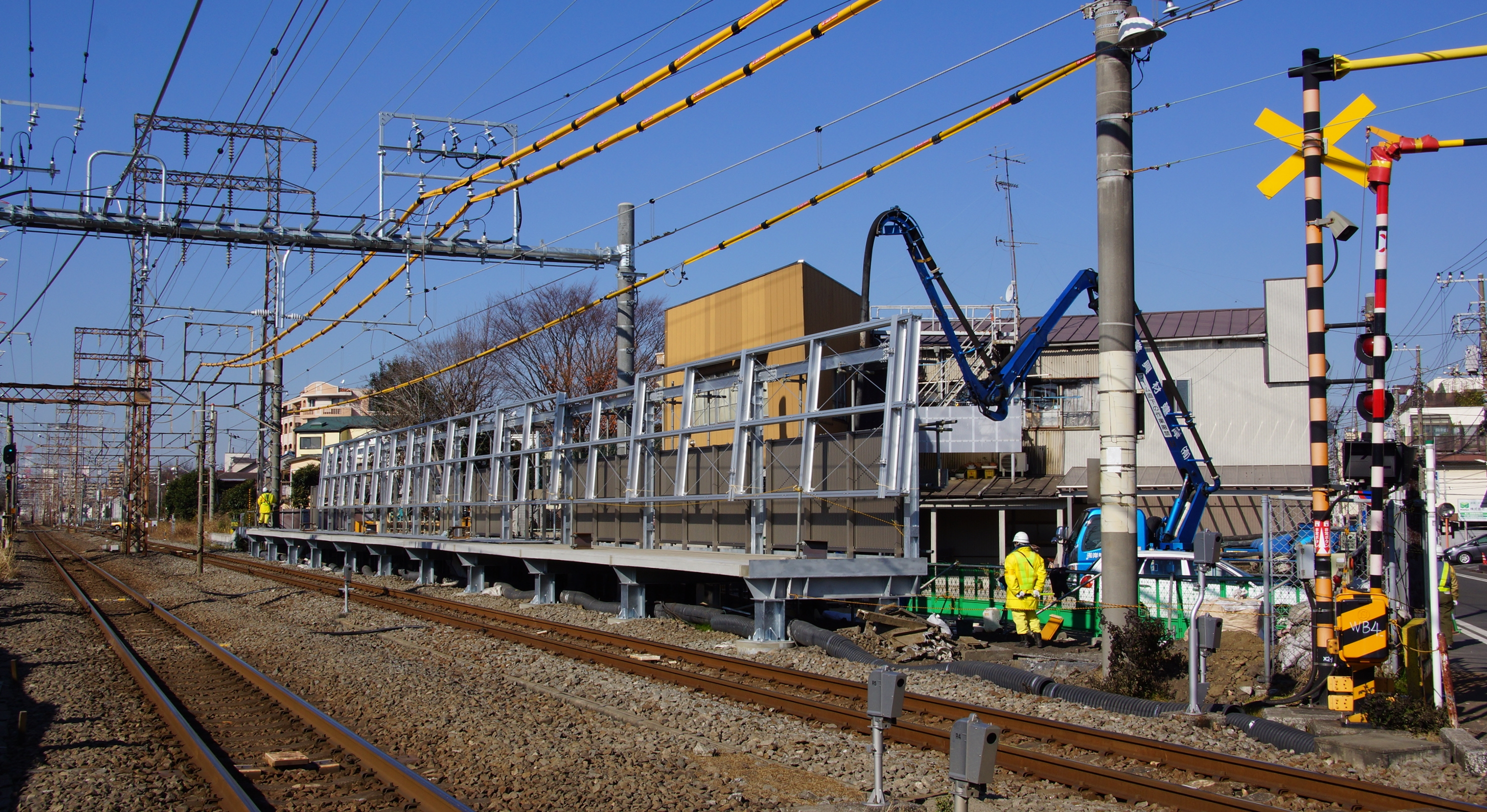
The Hama-Kawasaki-bound platform (platform 1) under construction in January 2016

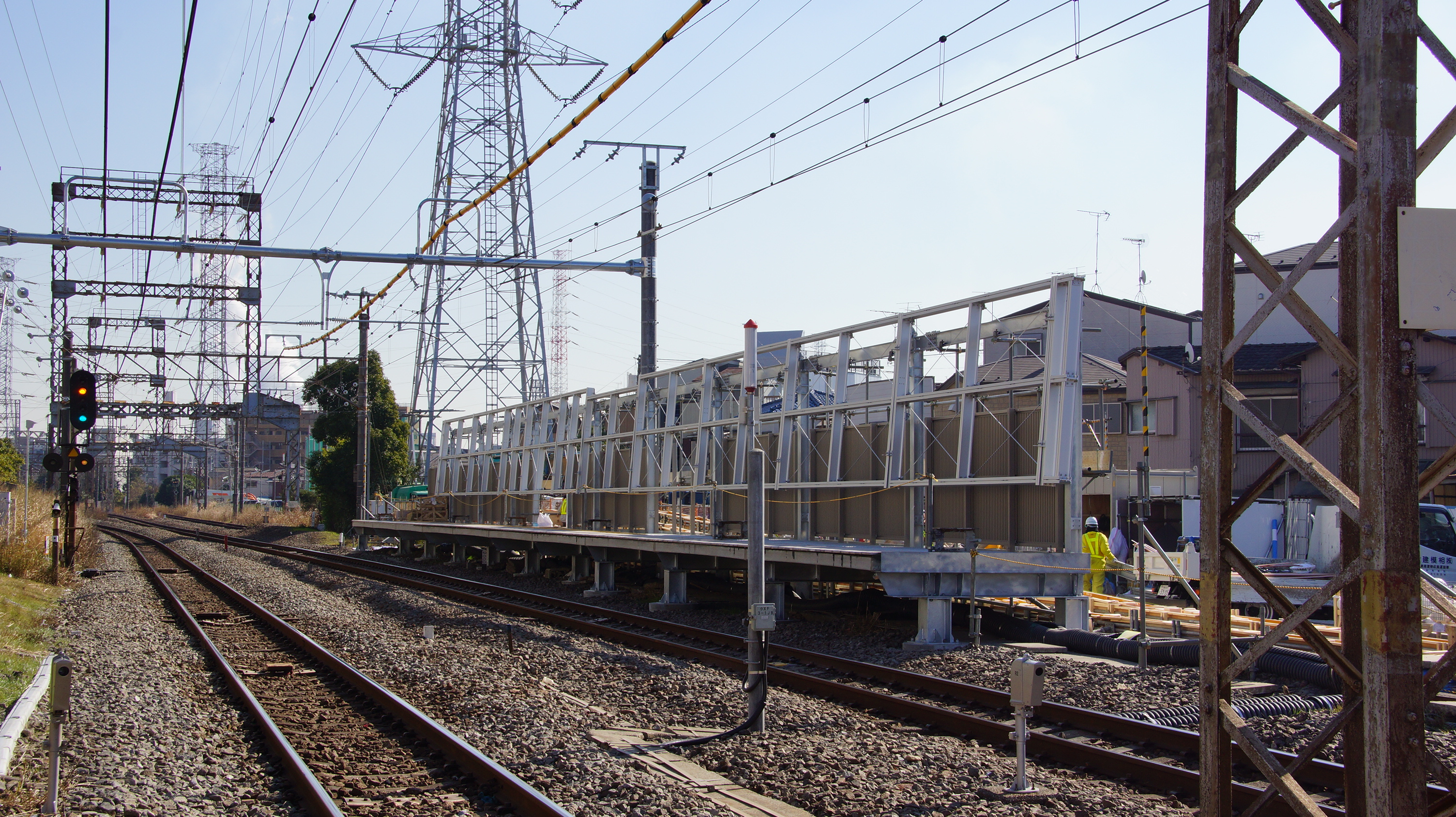
The Shitte-bound platform (platform 2) under construction in January 2016

== History ==
Details of the proposed station were announced by JR East in January 2015, with the station provisionally named Odasakae-Shin Station (小田栄新駅). A public ballot was held in August 2015 to select the name of the new station from among three candidates: Odasakae Station (小田栄駅), Oda-Kawasaki Station (小田川崎駅), and Oda-Yasaka-Shin Station (小田弥栄駅). The name Odasakae was announced in September 2015.

The total construction cost of approximately 548 million yen was borne equally by JR East and the city of Kawasaki.The stationeries was opened on March 26, 2016.

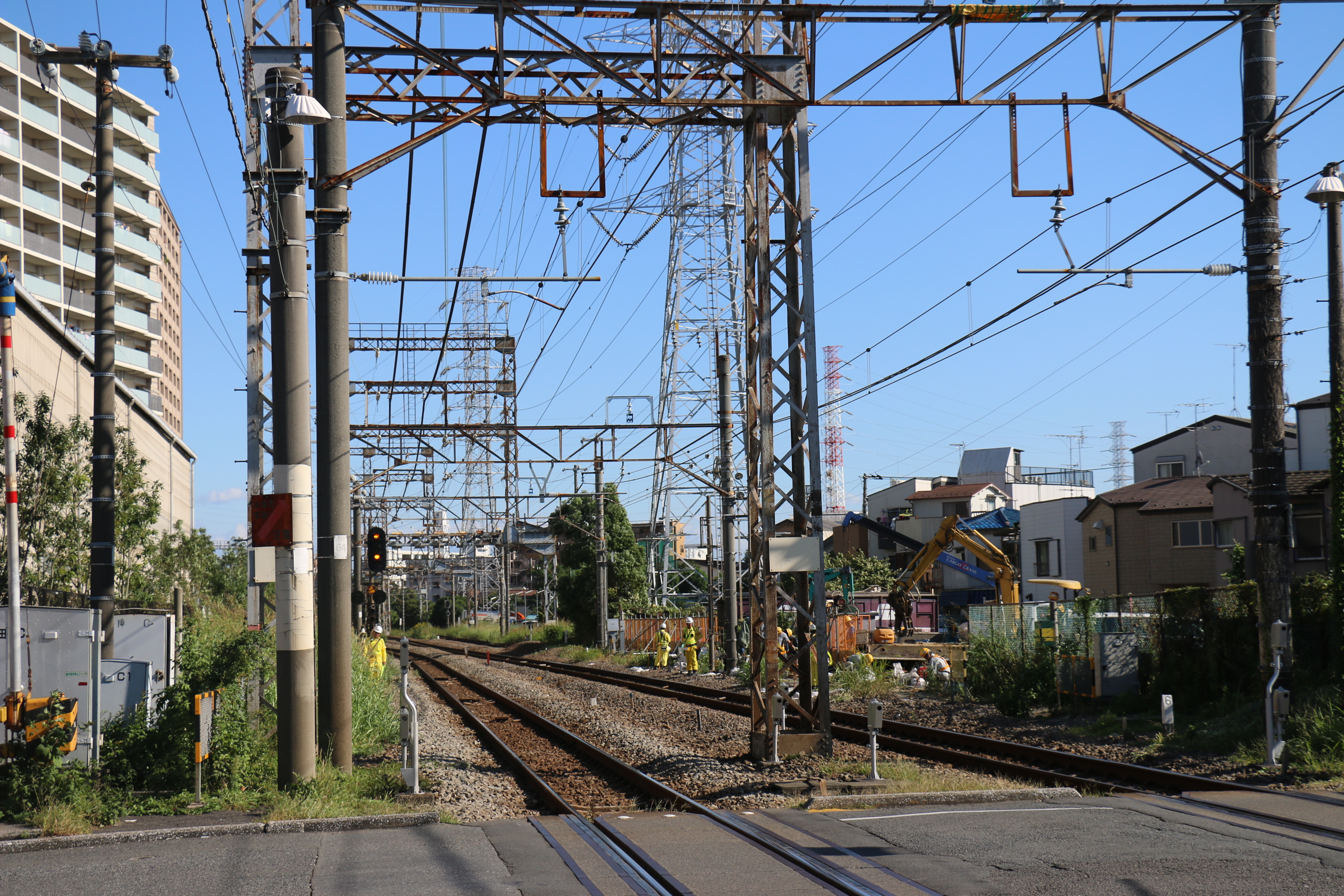
Construction on the site of the up platform in October 2015

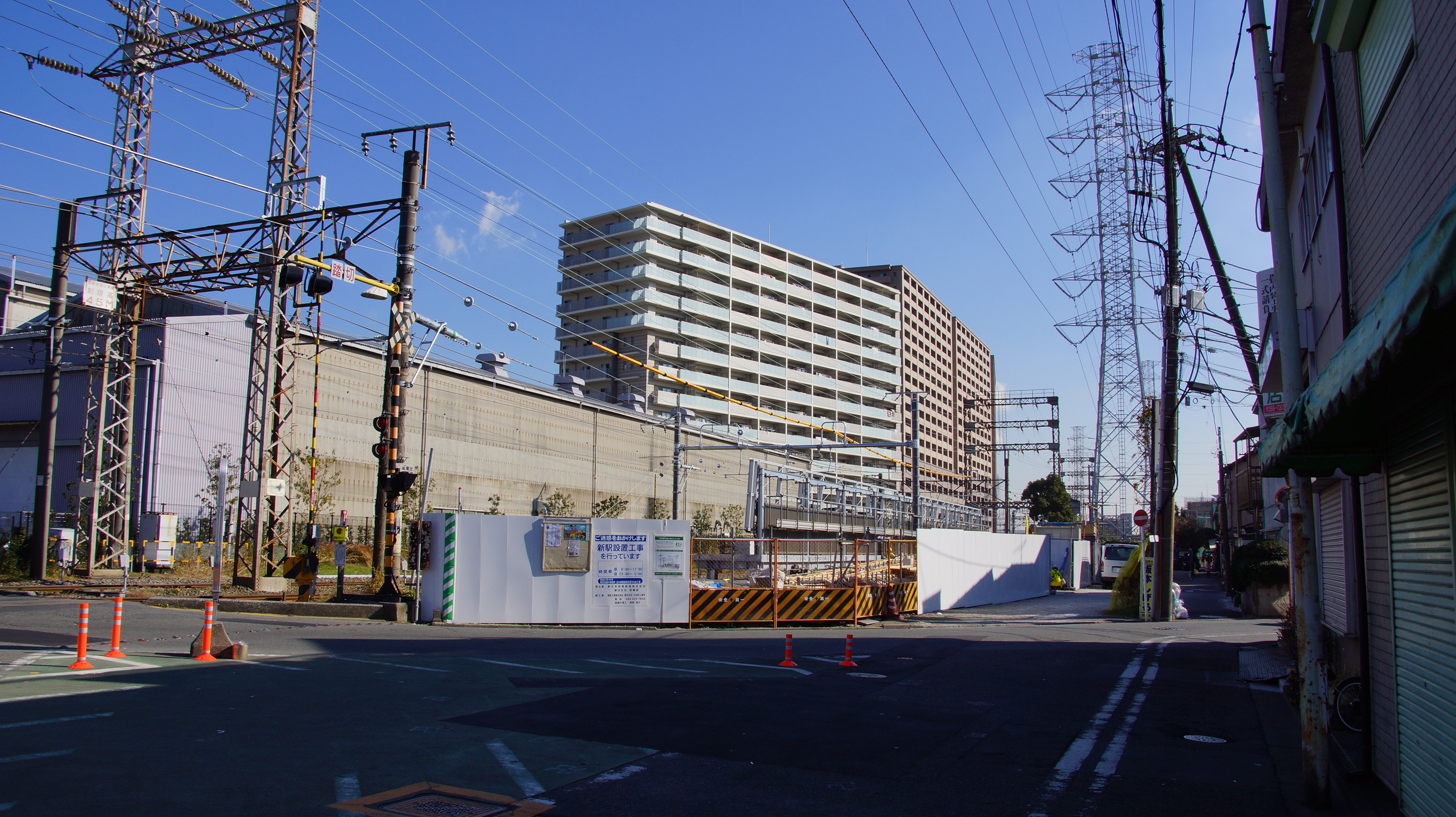
Odasakae level crossing in January 2016, with the up platform under construction on the right

From 1 October 2016, JR East has introduced station numbering in the Tokyo area, with Odasakae Station becoming "JN 53".

== Passenger statistics ==
The station is expected to be used by an average of approximately 3,500 passengers daily.

== Surrounding area ==
- Higashi-Oda Elementary School

== See also ==
- List of railway stations in Japan
