= Musashi-Shiraishi Station =

Railway station in Kawasaki, Kanagawa Prefecture, Japan

JI07 Musashi-Shiraishi Station 武蔵白石駅
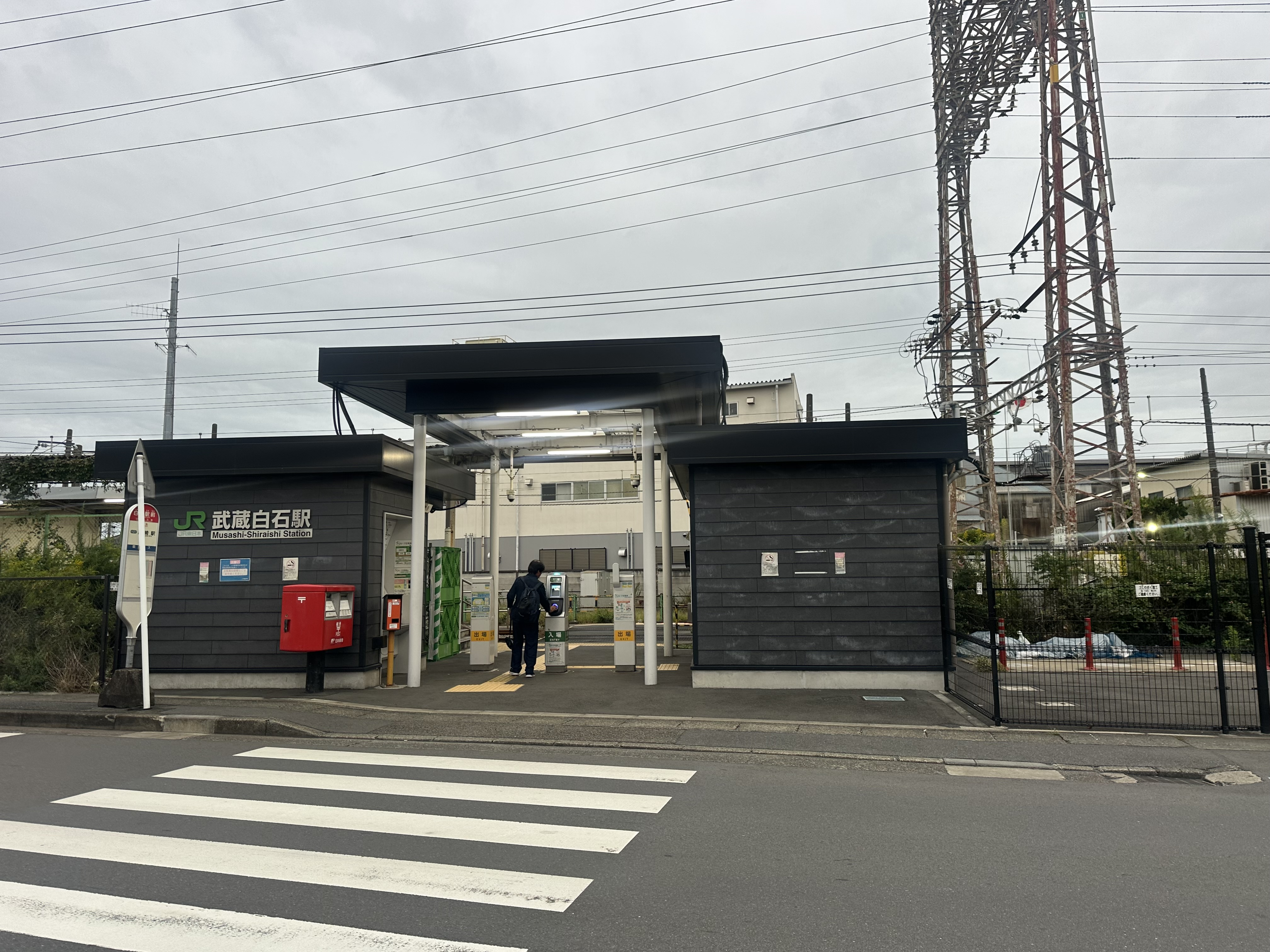
- Musashi-Shiraishi Station, October 2025

General information
- Location: Shiraishi-chō, Kawasaki-ku, Kawasaki-shi, Kanagawa-ken 210-0857; Japan
- Coordinates: 35°30′6.76″N 139°42′23.6″E
- Operator: JR East
- Line: Tsurumi Line

Other information
- Station code: JI07
- Website: Official website

History
- Opened: 10 March 1926; 100 years ago

Passengers
- FY2008: 1,601 daily

Services
Preceding station	JR East	Following station
Anzen JI06 towards Tsurumi	Tsurumi Line Main Line	Hama-Kawasaki JI08 towards Ōgimachi
Location
- Location within Kanagawa Prefecture Location within Japan

Musashi-Shiraishi Station (武蔵白石駅, Musashi-Shiraishi-eki) is a passenger railway station located in Kawasaki-ku, Kawasaki, Kanagawa Prefecture, Japan, operated by East Japan Railway Company (JR East).

== Lines ==
Musashi-Shiraishi Station is served by the Tsurumi Line, and is 4.1 kilometers (2.5 mi) from the terminus of the line at Tsurumi Station. The station is located at the junction of the main route of the Tsurumi Line and its branch to Ōkawa, however the platform for the branch line at the station was removed in March 1996 so that only mainline trains now stop at the station.

== Station layout ==
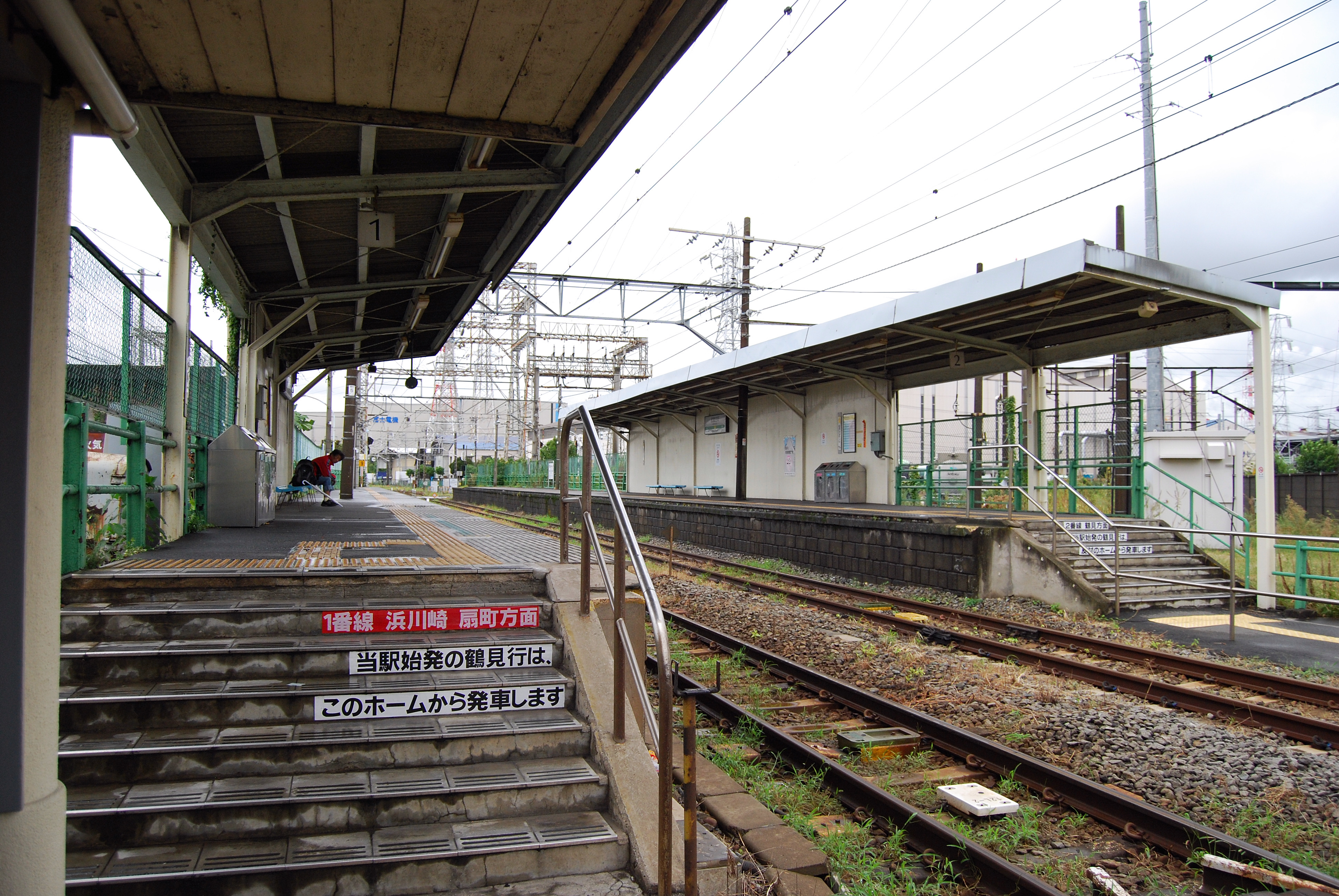
Station platforms, September 2010

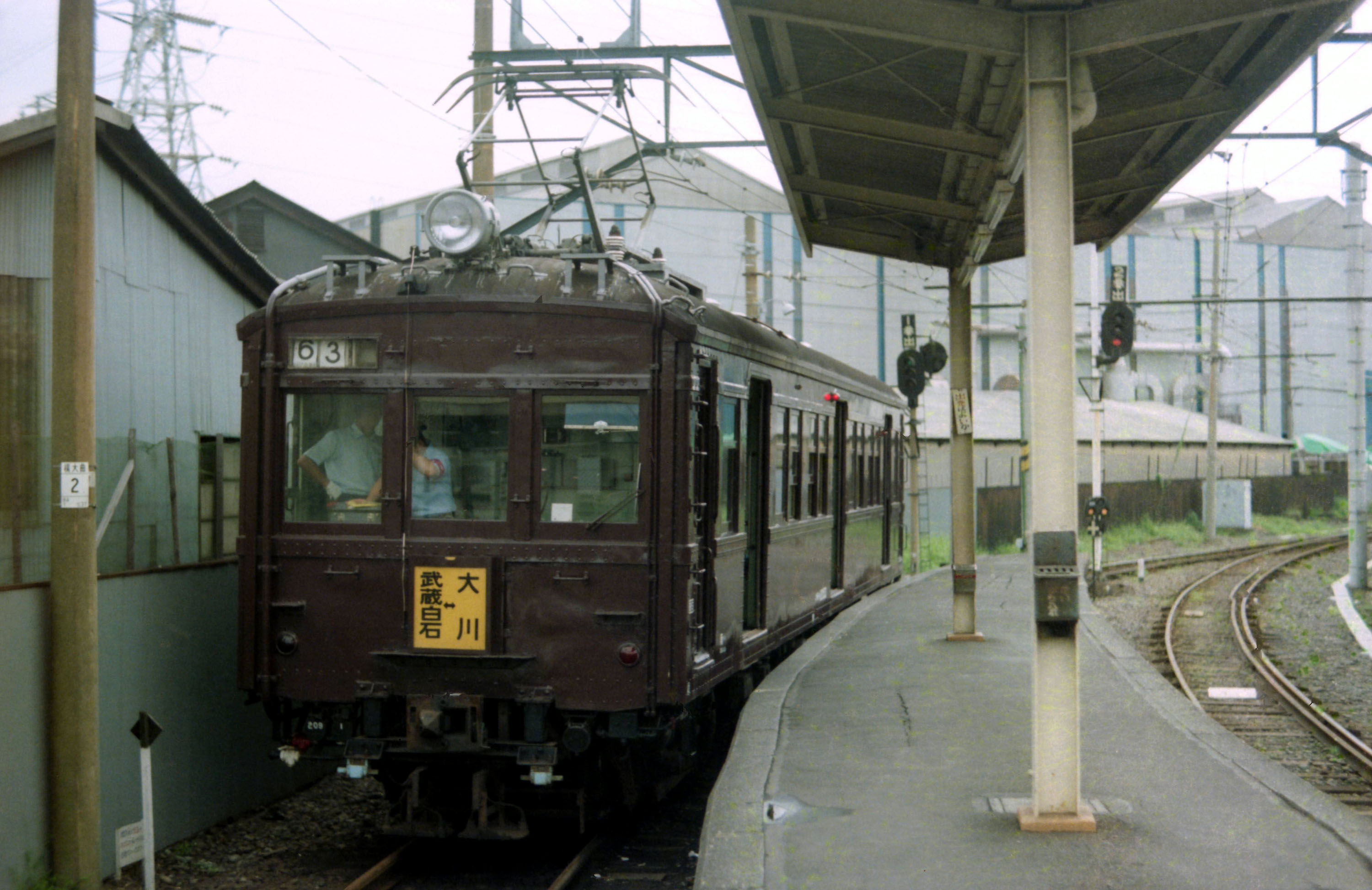
Former Ōkawa branch platform, August 1980

The station consists of two opposed side platforms serving two tracks, connected by a level crossing. The station is unattended.

=== Platforms ===
1	Tsurumi Line	for Hama-Kawasaki and Ōgimachi
2	Tsurumi Line	for Asano, Bentembashi, and Tsurumi

== History ==
Musashi-Shiraishi Station was opened on 10 March 1926 as a station on the privately held Tsurumi Rinkō Railway (鶴見臨港鉄道, Tsurumi Rinkō Tetsudō) initially for freight operations only. The station was closed on November 15, 1930 and reopened as the Musashi-Shiraishi Stop for passenger services only from 26 July 1931. It was elevated in status to that of a full station on 17 March 1936. The line was nationalized on 1 July 1943 and was absorbed into the Japanese Government Railways network. The station has been unstaffed since 1 March 1971. Upon the privatization of the Japanese National Railways (JNR) on 1 April 1987 the station has been operated by JR East.

The short platform (platforms 3 and 4) for the Ōkawa branch line was used until March 1996, when the branch line started operating three-car trains that were longer than the platform.

== Passenger statistics ==
In fiscal 2008, the station was used by an average of 1,601 passengers daily (boarding passengers only).

== Surrounding area ==
- Fuji Electric Kawasaki Factory

== See also ==
- List of railway stations in Japan
