= Hatchōnawate Station =

Railway station in Kawasaki, Kanagawa Prefecture, Japan

JN51 KK27 Hatchōnawate Station (JR) Hatchō-nawate Station (Keikyū) 八丁畷駅
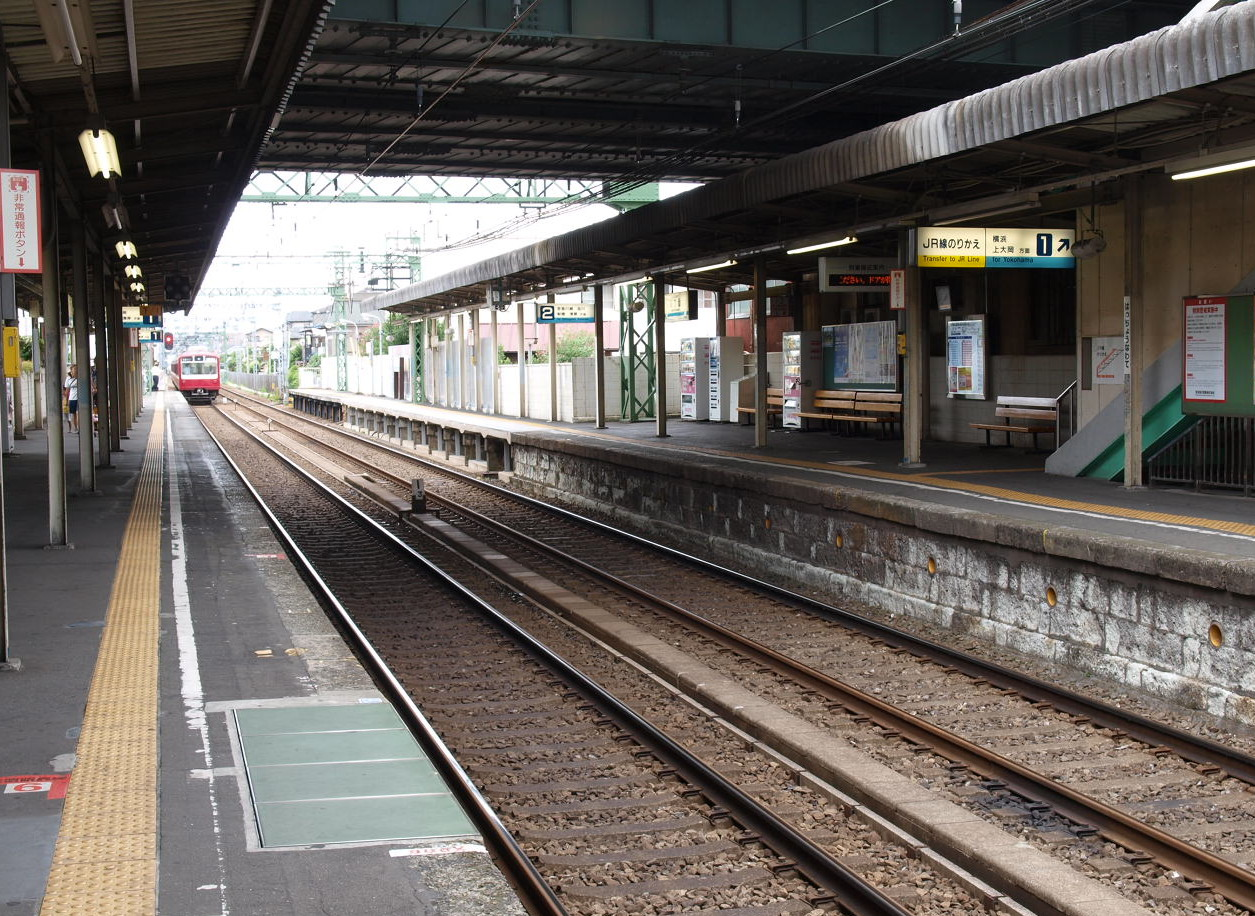
- Keikyu Hatchō-nawate Station

General information
- Location: 1-6-1 Ikeda, Kawasaki-ku, Kawasaki-shi, Kanagawa-ken 210-0022; Japan
- Coordinates: 35.5229°N 139.6914°E
- Operator: Keikyū; JR East
- Lines: Keikyū Main Line; Nambu Branch Line
- Platforms: 3 side platforms
- Connections: Bus stop

Other information
- Station code: KK27

History
- Opened: December 25, 1916

Passengers
- FY2019: 16,165 (Keikyū, total); 1,792 (JR, boarding) daily

Services
Preceding station	JR East	Following station
Shitte JN02 Terminus	Nambu Branch Line	Kawasakishimmachi JN52 towards Hama-Kawasaki
Preceding station	Keikyu	Following station
Tsurumi-Ichiba KK28 towards Uraga	Main Line Local	Keikyū Kawasaki KK20 towards Shinagawa
Location
- Location within Kanagawa Prefecture Location within Japan

Hatchōnawate Station or Hatchō-nawate Station (八丁畷駅, Hatchōnawate-eki) is an interchange passenger railway station located in Kawasaki-ku, Kawasaki, Kanagawa Prefecture, Japan, jointly operated by East Japan Railway Company (JR East) and the private railway operator Keikyū.

== Lines ==
The station is served by the Keikyū Main Line and JR East's Nambu Branch Line. It is located 1.1 kilometers from the Shitte junction on the Nambu Branch Line, and 13.1 kilometers from the starting point of the Keikyū Main Line at Shinagawa Station, in Tokyo.

== Station layout ==
The Keikyū station has two opposed side platforms connected to the station building by a footbridge, and the JR East station has one side platform serving a single track.

=== Platforms ===
1	Keikyu Main Line	for Yokohama, Zushi·Hayama, Uraga, and Keikyū Kurihama
2	Keikyu Main Line	for Keikyū Kamata, Haneda Airport, and Shinagawa
3	Nambu Branch Line	for Shitte or Hamakawasaki

== History ==
Hatchōnawate Station opened on December 25, 1916, as a station on the Keihin Electric Railway. The Nambu Line connected to the station on March 25, 1930 initially for freight operations, and with passenger operations from April 10 of the same year. The Nambu line was nationalized on April 1, 1944 and freight operations abolished the same year. It later became part of the Japanese National Railways (JNR) system. The level crossing at the station was replaced by a footbridge on October 28, 1974. Along with privatization and division of JNR, JR East assumed operations of the Nambu Branch Line from April 1, 1987. The station building was rebuilt in 1989.

Keikyū introduced station numbering to its stations on 21 October 2010; Hatchōnawate Station was assigned station number KK27.

== Passenger statistics ==
In fiscal 2019, the JR station was used by an average of 1,792 passengers daily (boarding passengers only). During the same period, the Keikyū Station was used by an average of 16,165 passengers daily (total passengers).

The passenger figures (boarding passengers only) for previous years are as shown below.

Fiscal year	JR East	Keikyū
2005	940	5,866
2010	1,187	6,980
2015	1,409	7,325

== Surrounding area ==
- Japan National Route 15
- Kawasaki Kyomachi Post Office
- Mashima Hospital

== See also ==
- List of railway stations in Japan
