= Hama-Kawasaki Station =

Railway station in Kawasaki, Kanagawa Prefecture, Japan

JI08 JN54 Hama-Kawasaki Station 浜川崎駅
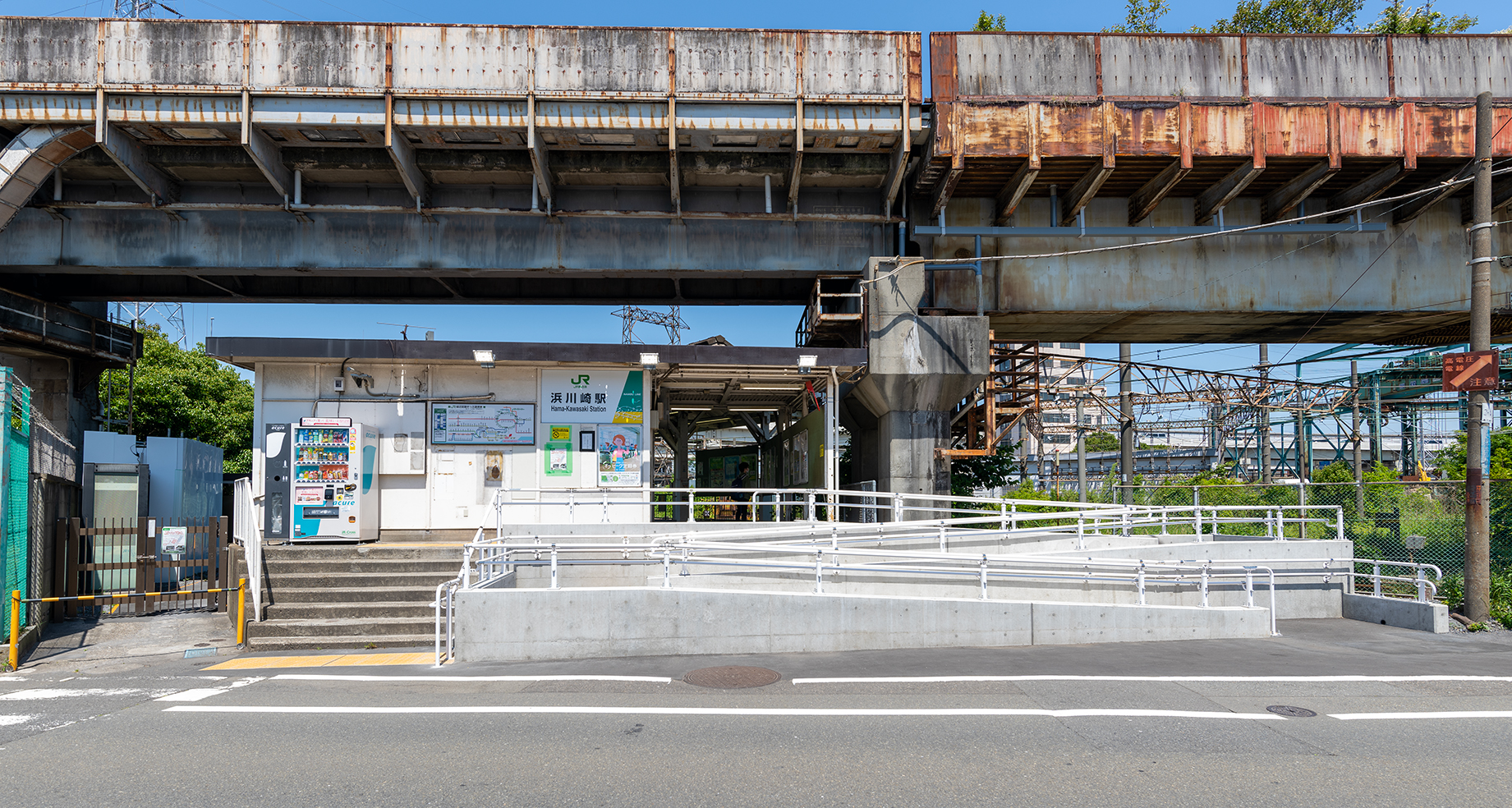
- The Nambu line entrance in May 2023

General information
- Location: Kawasaki-ku, Kawasaki; Japan
- Coordinates: 35°30′36″N 139°42′49″E
- Operator: JR East
- Lines: Tsurumi Main Line; Nambu Branch Line
- Distance: 5.7 km (3.5 mi) from Tsurumi; 4.1 km (2.5 mi) from Shitte
- Platforms: 1 island platform, 1 side platform
- Tracks: 3
- Connections: Bus stop

Construction
- Structure type: At-grade

Other information
- Status: Unstaffed
- Website: www.jreast.co.jp/estation/station/info.aspx?StationCd=1246

History
- Opened: 1 May 1918

Passengers
- FY2008: 2,606 daily

Services
Preceding station	JR East	Following station
Musashi-Shiraishi JI07 towards Tsurumi	Tsurumi Line Main Line	Shōwa JI09 towards Ōgimachi
Odasakae JN53 towards Shitte	Nambu Branch Line	Terminus
Location
- Location within Kanagawa Prefecture Location within Japan

Hama-Kawasaki Station (浜川崎駅, Hama-Kawasaki-eki) is a junction passenger railway station in Kawasaki-ku, Kawasaki, Kanagawa Prefecture, Japan, operated by the East Japan Railway Company (JR East). It is near a freight depot of the same name operated by the Japan Freight Railway Company (JR Freight)

== Lines ==
Hama-Kawasaki Station is served by the Tsurumi Line and is also the terminus of the 4.1 km (2.5 mi) Nambu Branch Line from Shitte. It lies 5.7 kilometers (3.5 mi) from the terminus of the Tsurumi Line at Tsurumi Station.

== Station layout ==
Hama-Kawasaki Station consists of two separate structures for the Tsurumi Line and Nambu Branch Line, located on either side of a street. The Nambu Branch Line station consists of an island platform with only the terminating track 2 on the west side used by Nambu Branch Line trains. Track 1 is a freight-only line, and the platform edge is fenced off on this side. The Tsurumi Line station also consists of an island platform, serving two tracks.

=== Platforms ===
2	Nambu Branch Line	for Hatchōnawate and Shitte
3	Tsurumi Line	for Ōgimachi
3	Tsurumi Line	for Asano, Bentembashi, and Tsurumi
4	Tsurumi Line	for Asano, Bentembashi, and Tsurumi

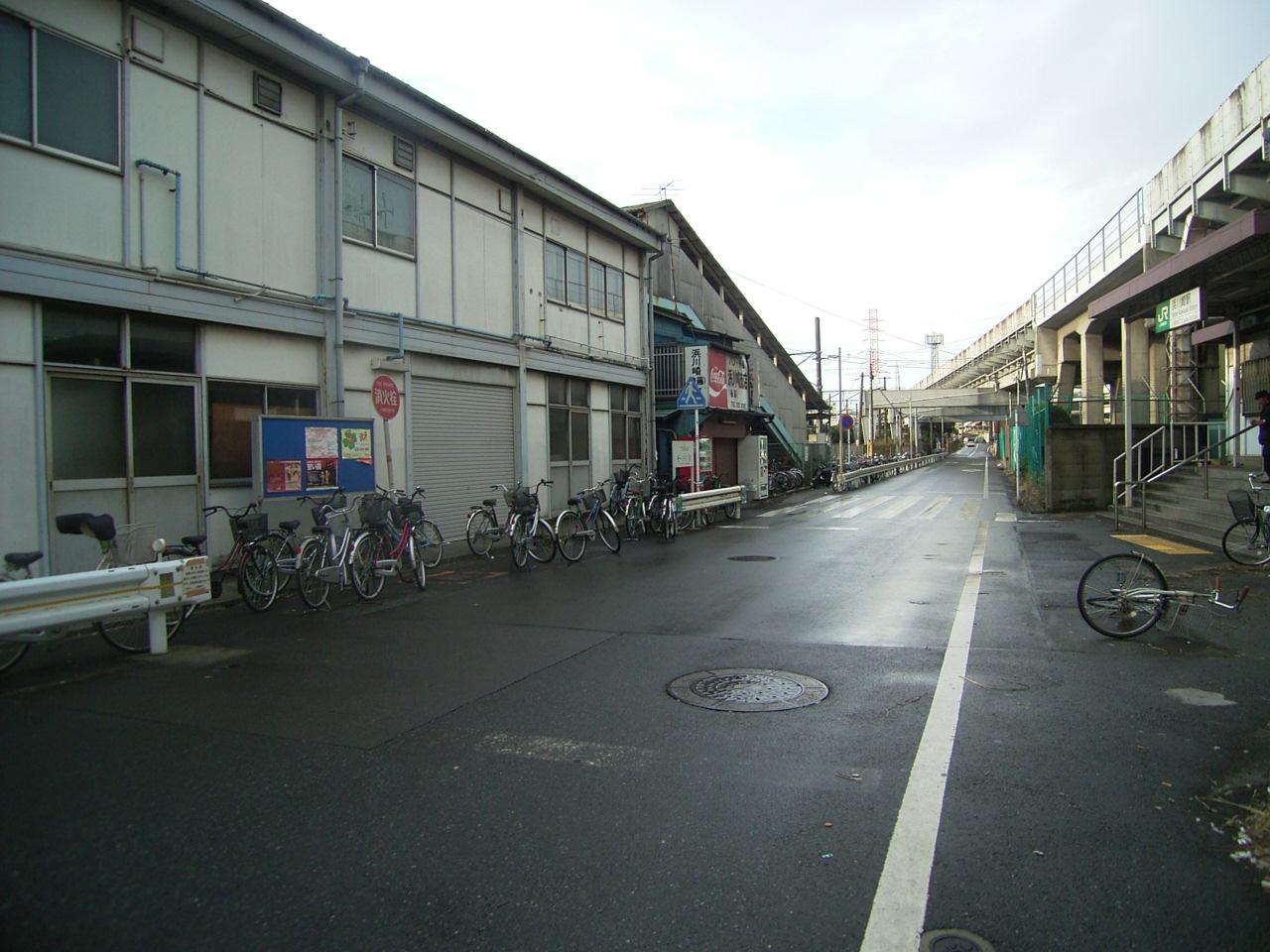
The street between the Tsurumi Line (left) and Nambu Line (right) entrances in December 2006

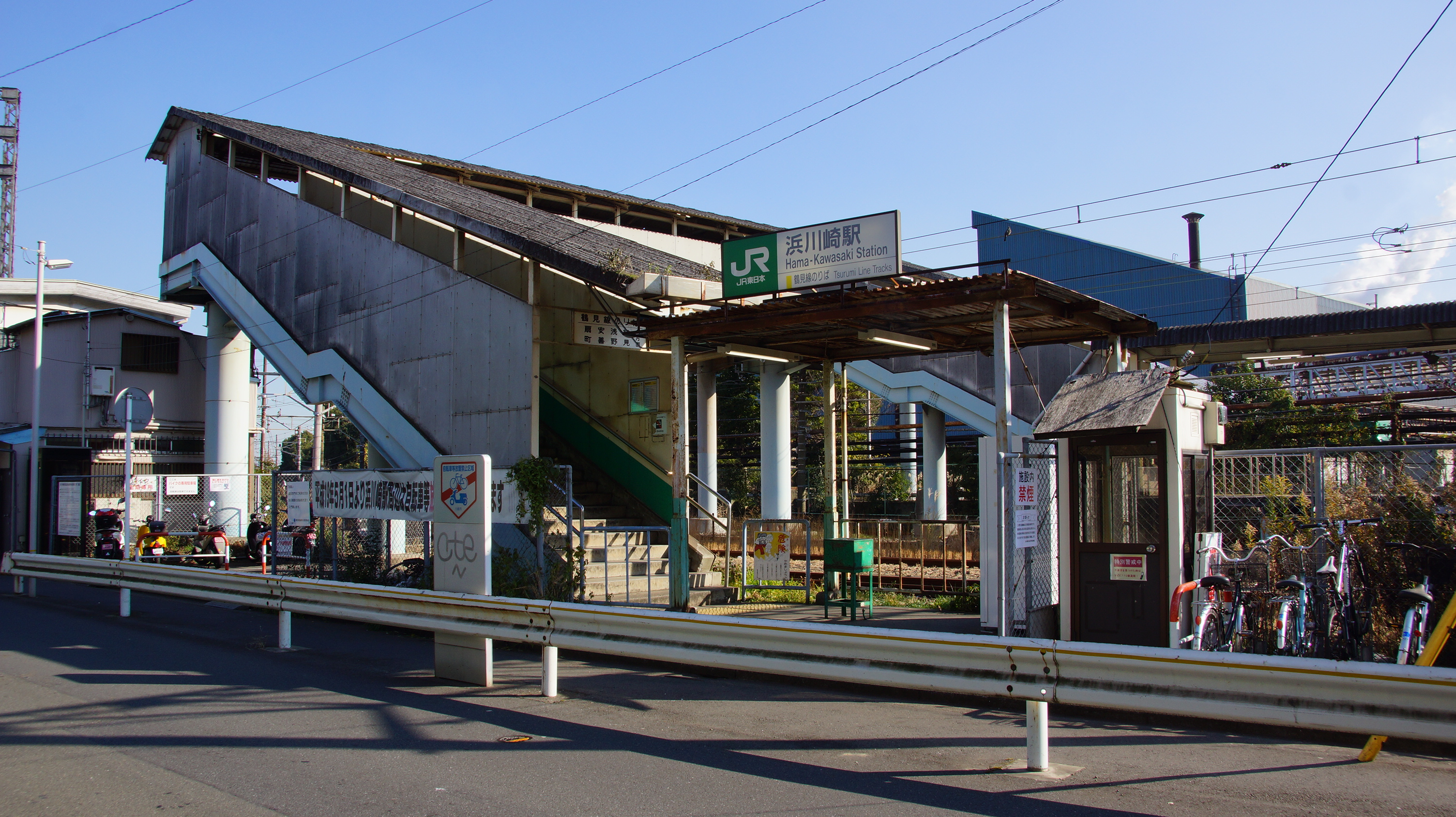
The Tsurumi Line entrance in January 2016

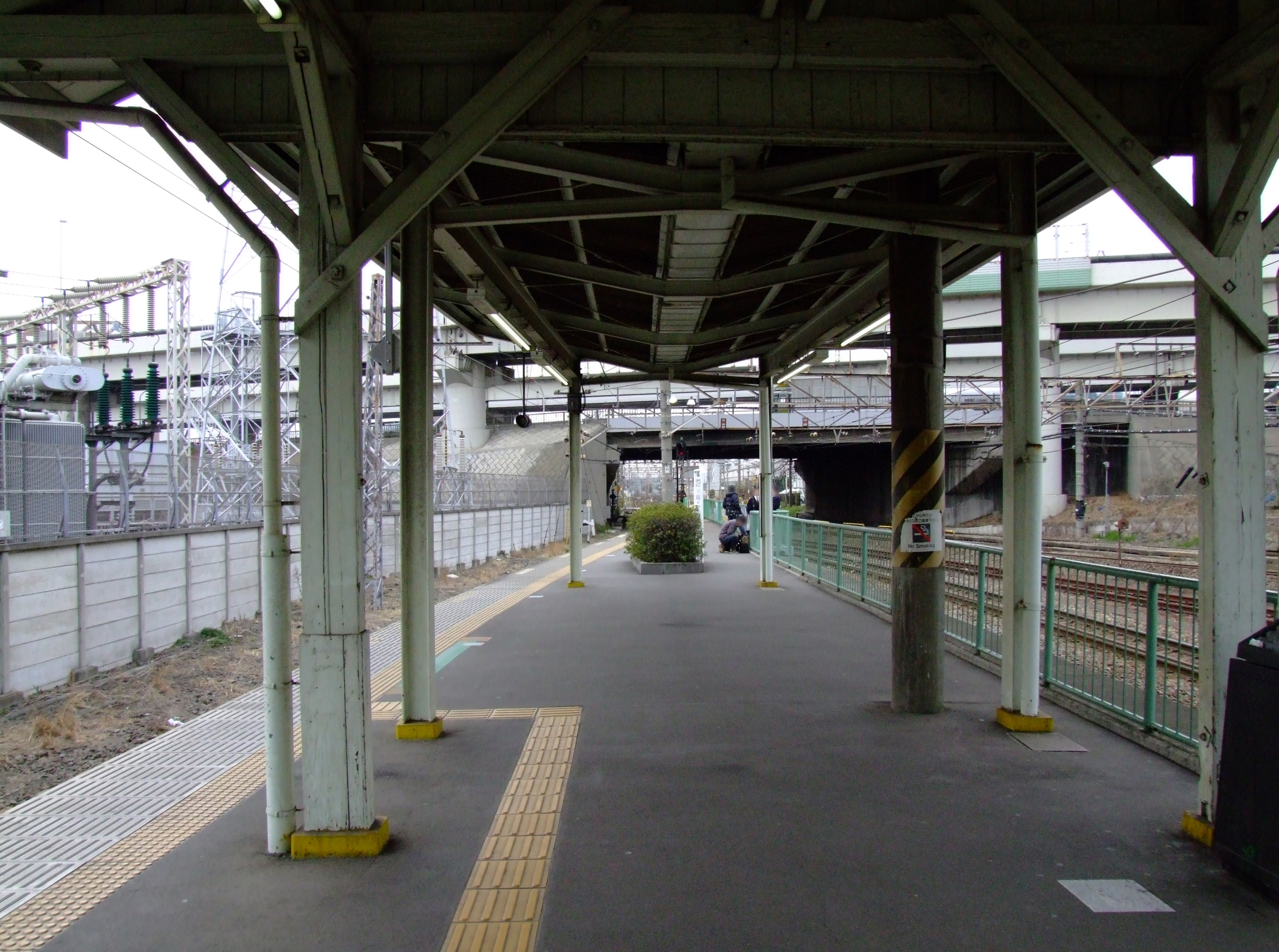
The Nambu Branch Line platform in March 2006

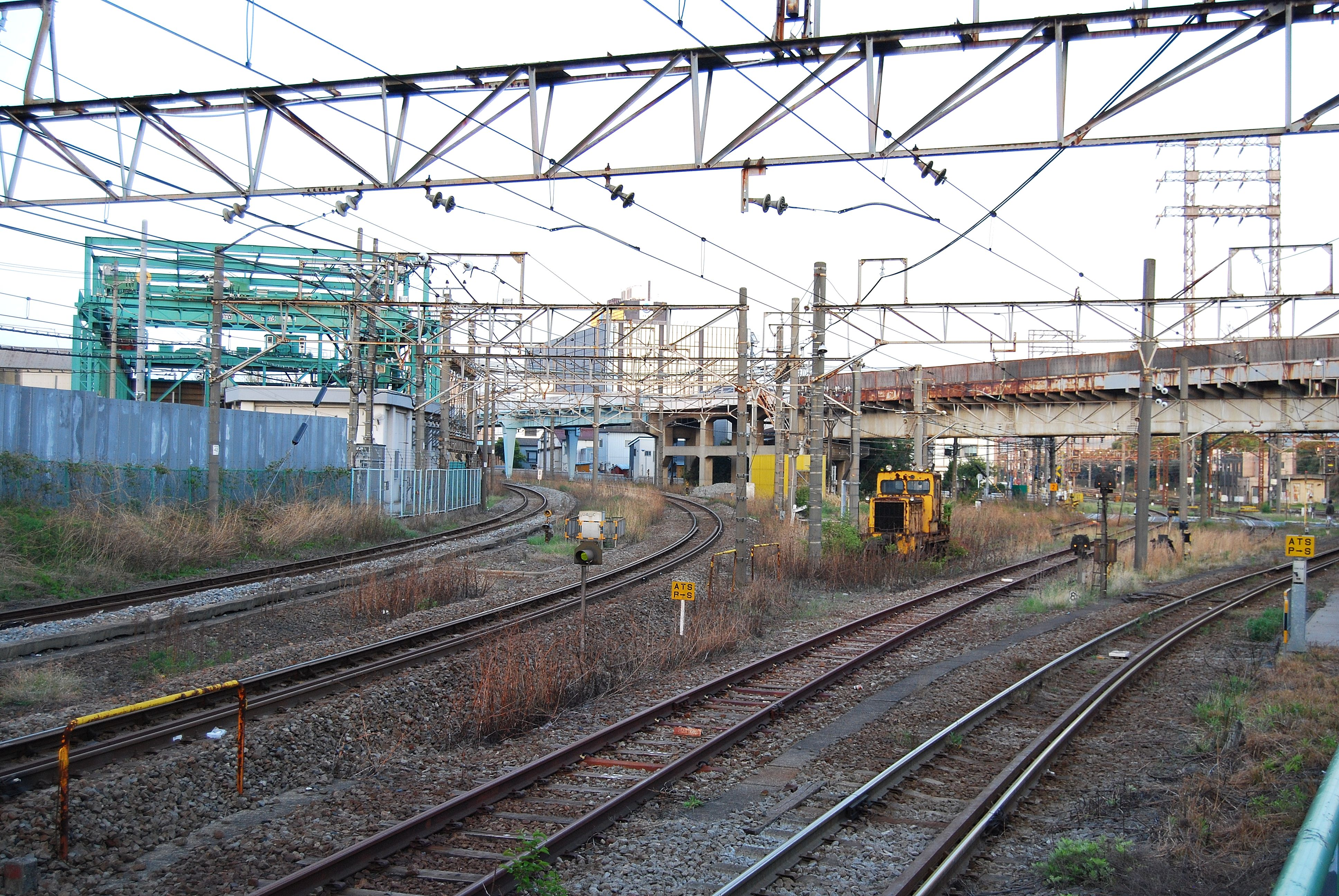
The view looking eastward from the Nambu Branch Line platform in April 2011. The tracks curving to the left are the Tokaido Freight Line, and the tracks to the right are freight tracks linking to the Tsurumi Line and yard.

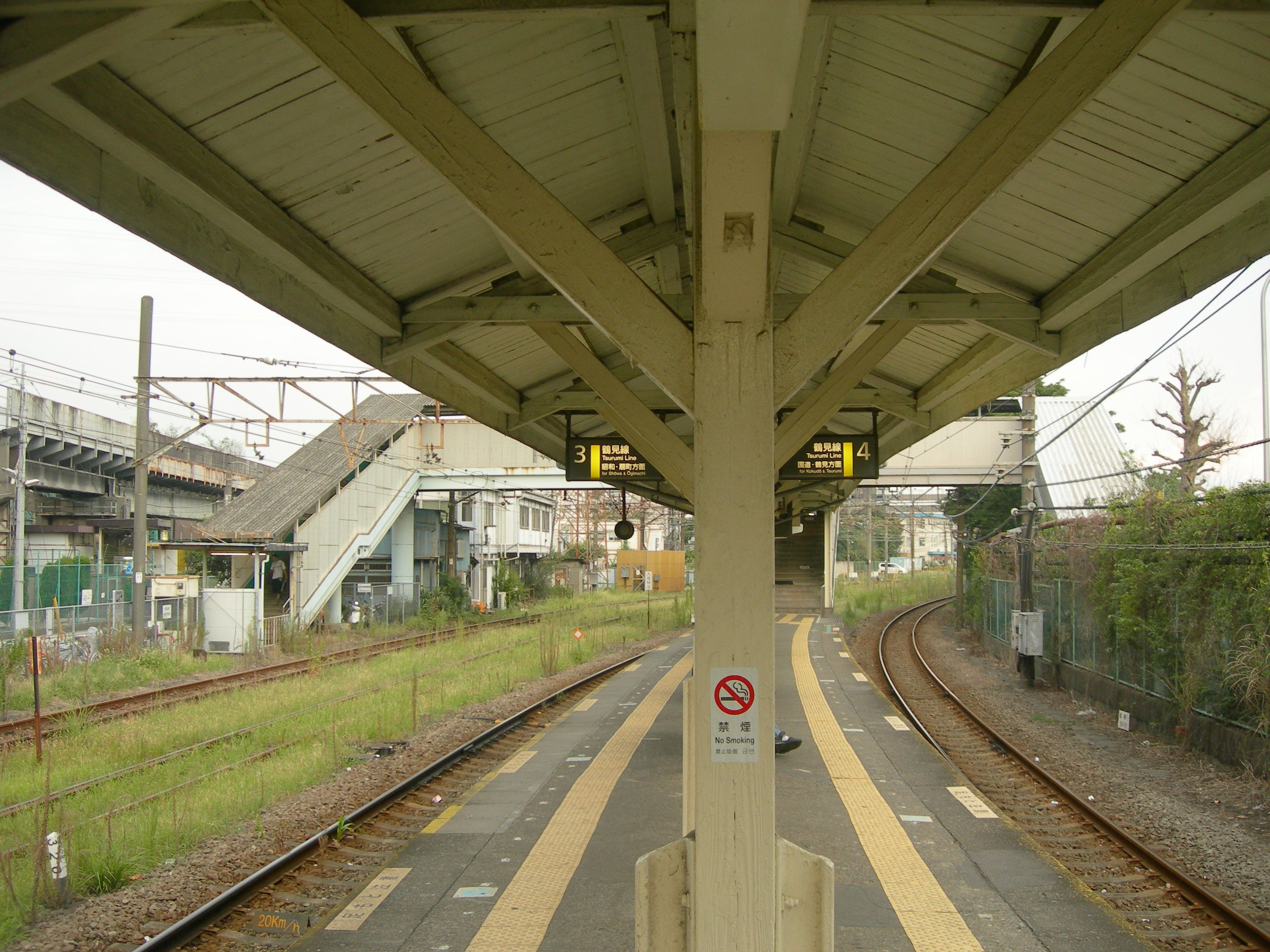
The Tsurumi Line platform in September 2010

== History ==
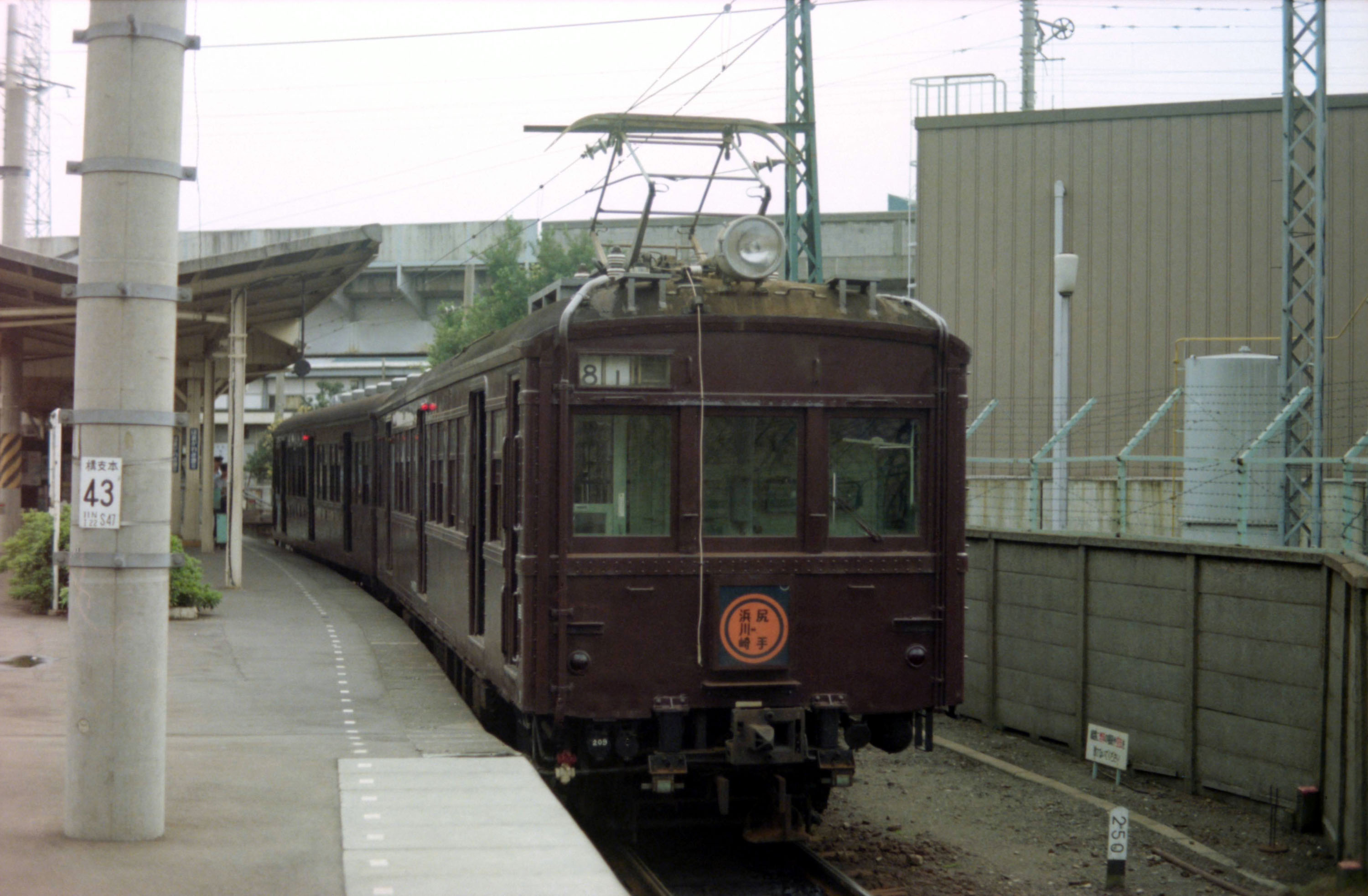
A train at the Nambu Branch Line platform in August 1980

Hama-Kawasaki Station opened on 1 May 1918, as a dedicated freight depot on the Tokaido Main Line. The privately held Tsurumi Rinkō Railway (鶴見臨港鉄道, Tsurumi Rinkō Tetsudō) also began operations to Hama-Kawasaki from 10 March 1926. On 14 March 1929, the Tsurumi Rinkō Railway transferred its freight depot to the adjacent Watarida Station (渡田駅, Watarida-eki). On 25 March 1930, the Nambu Railway began freight operations to Shin-Hamakawasaki Station and Hama-Kawasaki Station. Shin-Hamakawasaki began accepting passenger traffic from 10 April 1930, as did Watarida Station on 28 October of the same year.

The Tsurumi Rinkō Railway was nationalized into the Japanese Government Railways on July 1, 1943. at which time Watarida Station and Hama-Kawasaki Station were joined into a single station. The Nambu Line was likewise nationalized on April 1, 1944, and Shin-Hamakawasaki Station was merged into Hama-Kawasaki Station.

The station has been unstaffed since 1 March 1971. Upon the privatization of Japanese National Railways (JNR) on 1 April 1987, the station has been operated by JR East and JR Freight.

== Passenger statistics ==
In fiscal 2008, the station was used by an average of 2,606 passengers daily (boarding passengers only). The passenger figures for previous years are as shown below.

Fiscal year	Daily average
2004	1,905
2005	1,996
2006	2,139
2007	2,422
2008	2,606

== Surrounding area ==
- JFE Steel East Japan Works
- Kawasaki City Hall Tajima Branch
- Kawasaki City Watarida Elementary School
- Kawasaki Municipal Rinko Junior High School
- Kawasaki City Tajima School for the Disabled

== See also ==
- List of railway stations in Japan
