= Shōwa Station (Kanagawa) =

Railway station in Kawasaki, Kanagawa Prefecture, Japan

JI09 Shōwa Station 昭和駅
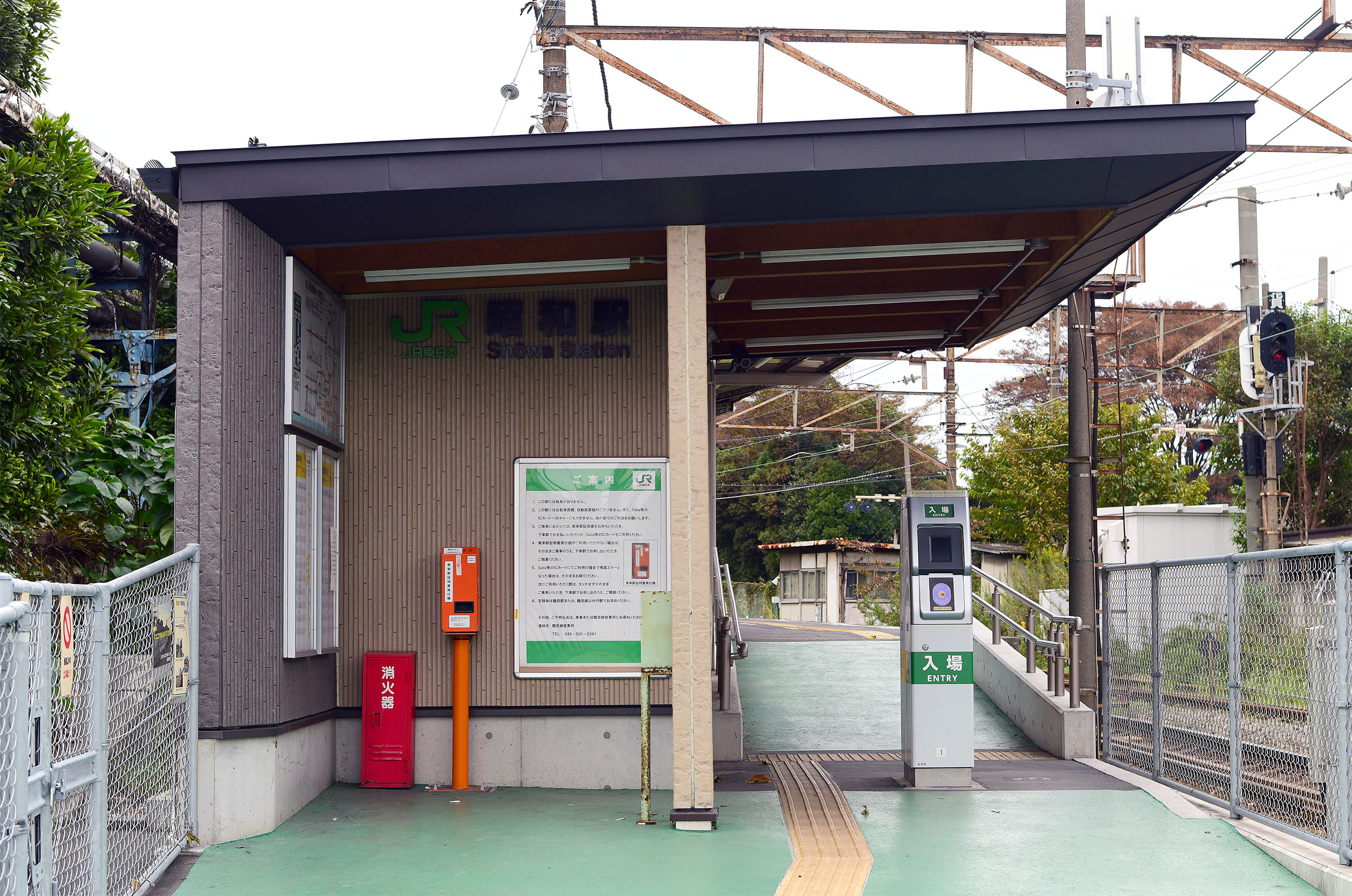
- Shōwa Station entrance October 2018

General information
- Location: 1 Ōgimachi, Kawasaki-ku, Kawasaki-shi, Kanagawa-ken 210-0867; Japan
- Coordinates: 35°30′24.61″N 139°43′26.03″E
- Operator: JR East
- Line: Tsurumi Line
- Distance: 6.4 km from Tsurumi
- Platforms: 1 side platform

Other information
- Station code: JI09
- Website: Official website

History
- Opened: 1 July 1943; 83 years ago

Passengers
- 569 daily

Services
Preceding station	JR East	Following station
Hama-Kawasaki JI08 towards Tsurumi	Tsurumi Line Main Line	Ōgimachi JI10 Terminus
Location
- Location within Kanagawa Prefecture Location within Japan

Shōwa Station (昭和駅, Shōwa-eki) is a passenger railway station located in Kawasaki-ku, Kawasaki, Kanagawa Prefecture, Japan, operated by East Japan Railway Company (JR East).

== Lines ==
Shōwa Station is served by the Tsurumi Line, and is 6.4 kilometers (4.0 mi) from the terminus of the line at Tsurumi Station

== Station layout ==
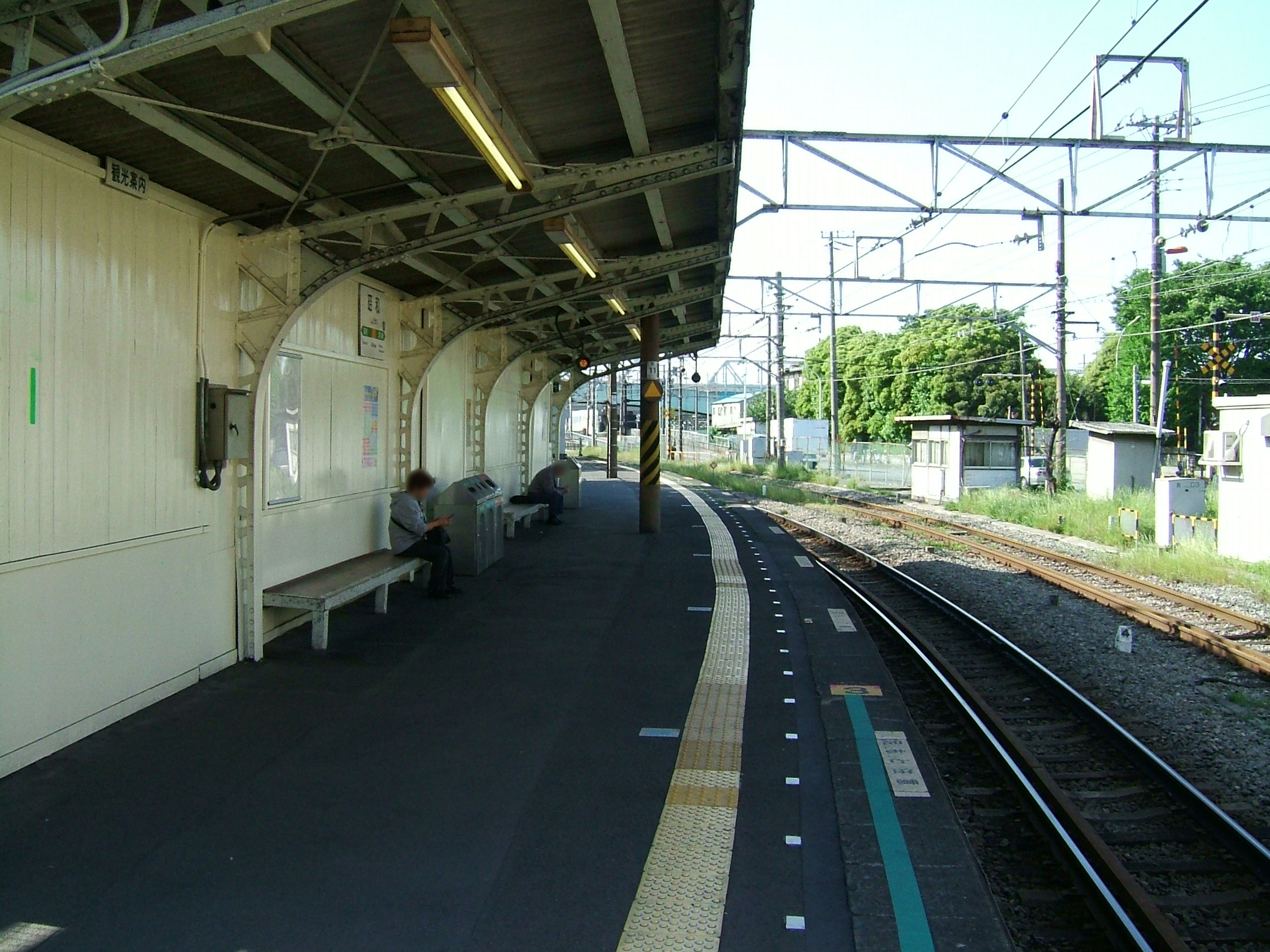
Station platform, May 2008

Shōwa Station has a single side platform serving bi-directional traffic. The station is unattended.

=== Platform ===
/	Tsurumi Line	for Ōgimachi for Asano, Bentembashi, and Tsurumi

== History ==
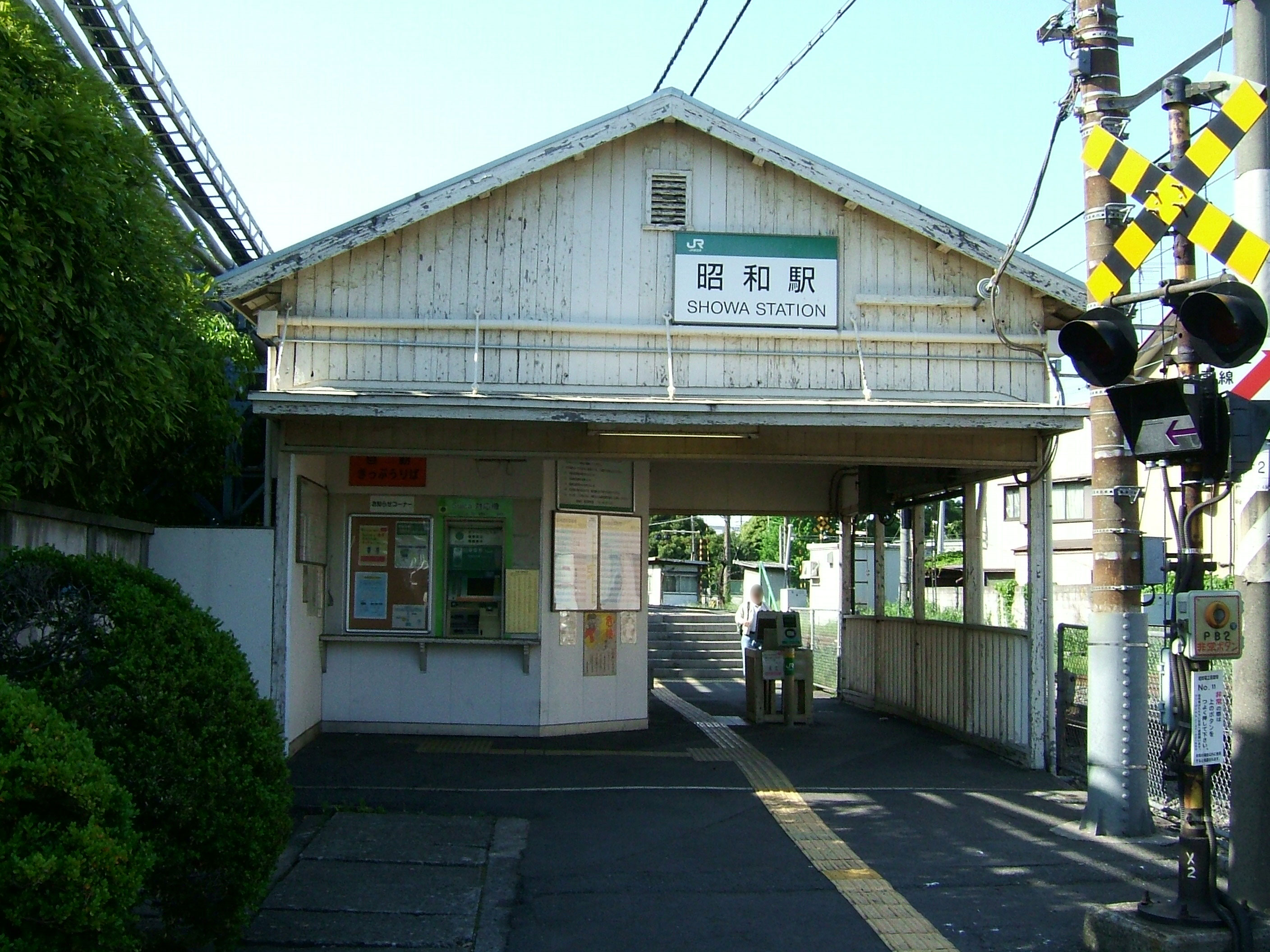
Shōwa Station entrance May 2008

Shōwa Station was opened on 20 March 1931 as a temporary stop on the privately held Tsurumi Rinkō Railway (鶴見臨港鉄道, Tsurumi Rinkō Tetsudō). Tsurumi Rinkō Railway was nationalized into the Japanese Government Railways on 1 July 1943. at which time the stop was upgraded to a full station. The station has been unattended since 1 March 1971. Upon the privatization of the Japanese National Railways on 1 April 1987 the station has been operated by JR East. The station was named Shōwa because it was adjacent to a factory of Shōwa Fertilizer Company (present-day Resonac). The Resonac factory still exists next to the station.

== Passenger statistics ==
In fiscal 2019, the station was used by an average of 569 passengers daily (boarding passengers only).

== Surrounding area ==
- Showa Denko Kawasaki Office
- Toa Oil Keihin Refinery Ogimachi Factory
- JFE Steel East Japan Works Keihin District

== See also ==
- List of railway stations in Japan
