= Shitte Station =

Railway station in Kawasaki, Kanagawa Prefecture, Japan

JN02 Shitte Station 尻手駅
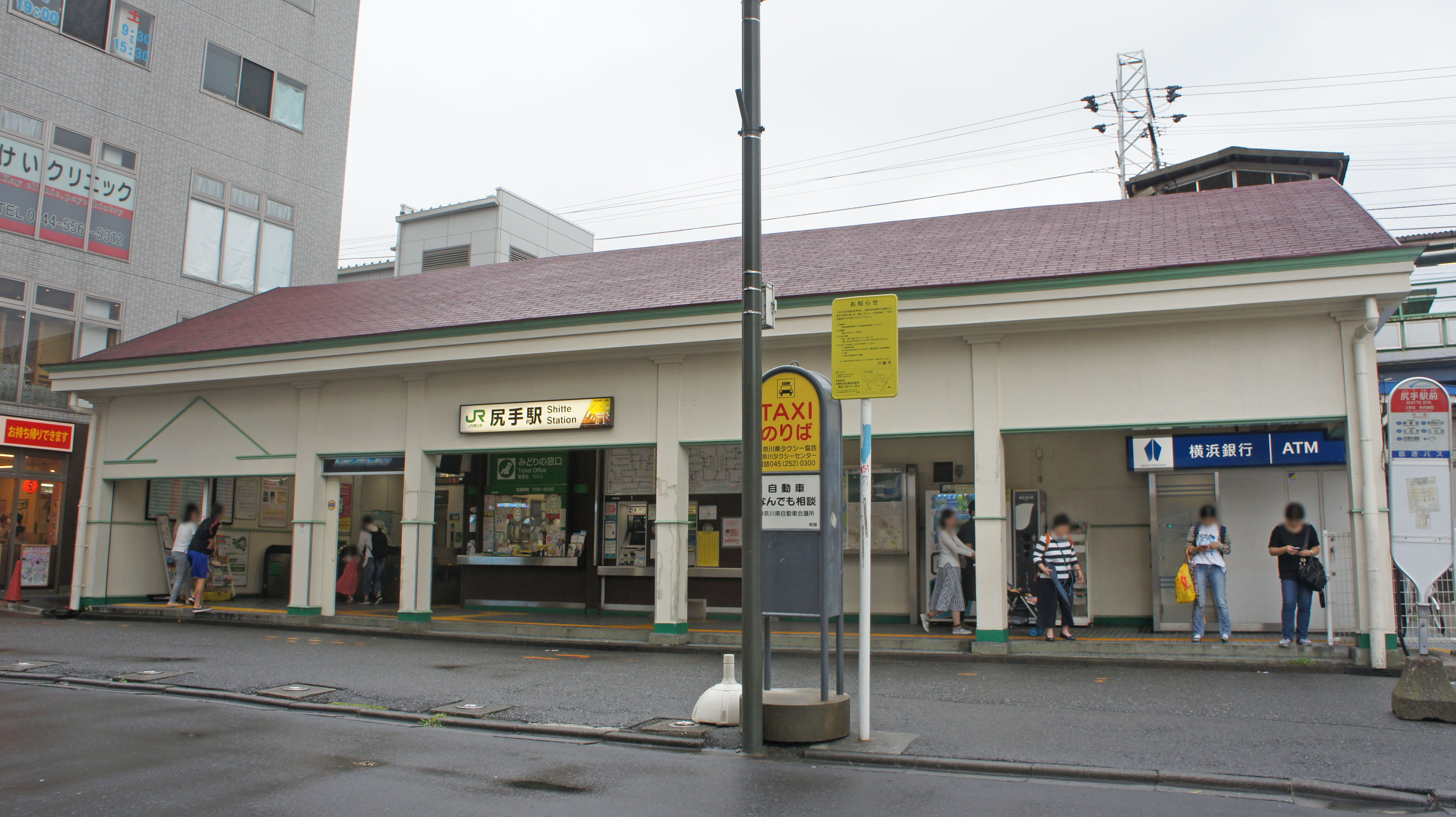
- Shitte Station, September 2019

General information
- Location: 3 Minami-Saiwaichō; Saiwai-ku, Kawasaki; Japan
- Coordinates: 35°31′51″N 139°41′03″E
- Operator: JR East
- Lines: Nambu Main Line; Nambu Branch Line
- Distance: 1.7 km (1.1 mi) from Kawasaki; 4.1 km (2.5 mi) from Hama-Kawasaki
- Platforms: 1 side platform, 1 island platform
- Tracks: 3
- Connections: Bus stop

Other information
- Status: Staffed ("Midori no Madoguchi" )
- Station code: JN02
- Website: Official website

History
- Opened: 9 March 1927

Passengers
- FY2019: 15,067 daily

Services
| Preceding station | JR East | Following station |
|---|---|---|
| Yakō JN03 towards Tachikawa | Nambu Line Local | Kawasaki Terminus |
| Terminus | Nambu Branch Line | Hatchōnawate JN51 towards Hama-Kawasaki |
Location
- Location within Kanagawa Prefecture Location within Japan

Shitte Station (Japanese: 尻手駅, Hepburn: Shitte-eki) is a passenger railway station located in Saiwai-ku, Kawasaki, Kanagawa Prefecture, Japan, operated by the East Japan Railway Company (JR East).

== Lines ==
Shitte Station is served by the Nambu Line. The station is 1.7 km (1.1 mi) from the southern terminus of the 35.5 km (22.1 mi) line at Kawasaki Station. It is also the northern terminus and starting point of the 4.1 km (2.5 mi) Nambu Branch Line to Hama-Kawasaki.

== Station layout ==
The station consists of a single side platform and an island platform serving three elevated tracks, connected by an underpass. The station has a "Midori no Madoguchi" staffed ticket office.

=== Platforms ===
| 1 | Nambu Line | for Kawasaki |
| 2 | Nambu Line | for Musashi-Kosugi, Musashi-Mizonokuchi, Noborito, and Tachikawa |
| 3 | Nambu Branch Line | for Hatchōnawate and Hama-Kawasaki |

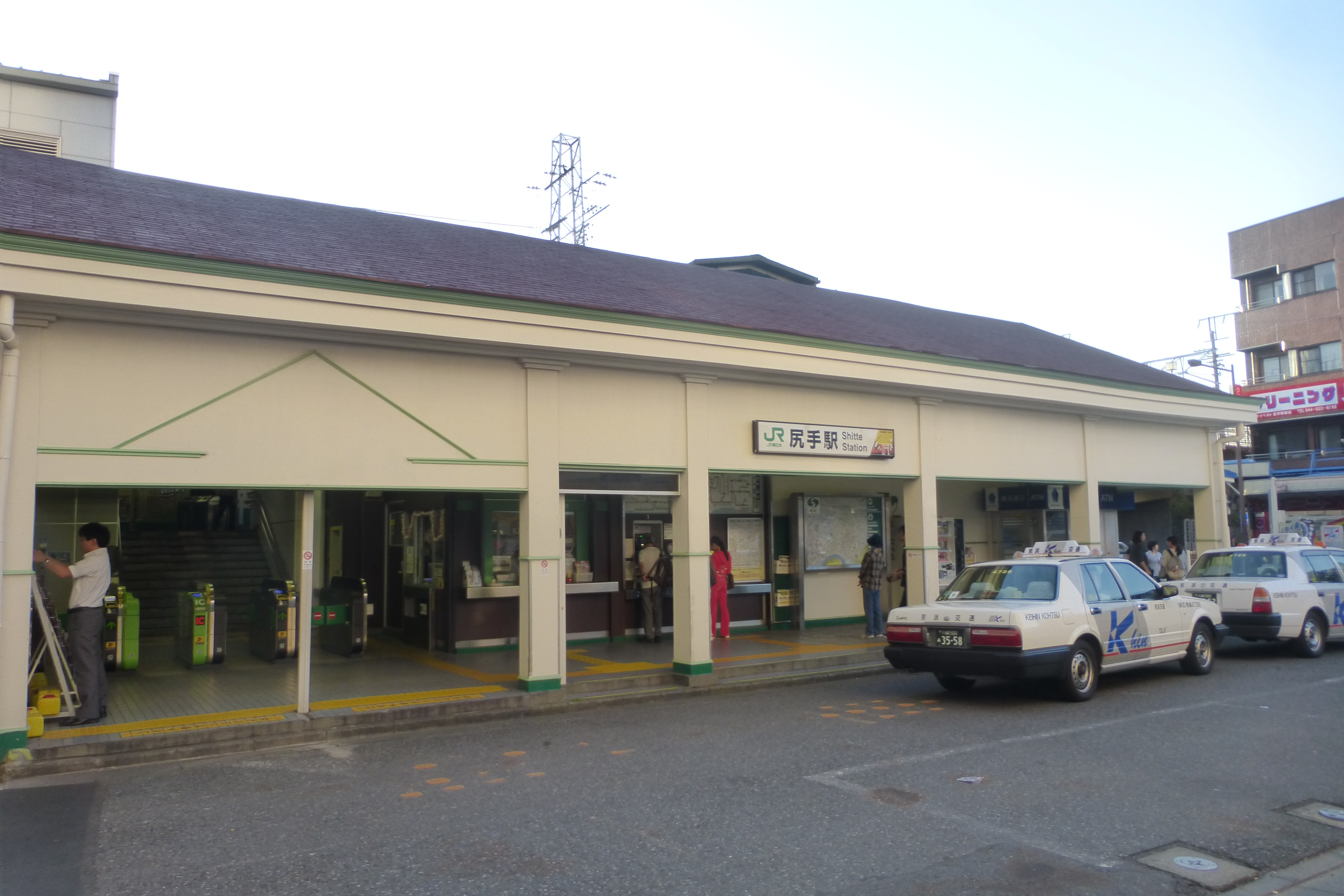
The station entrance in October 2015

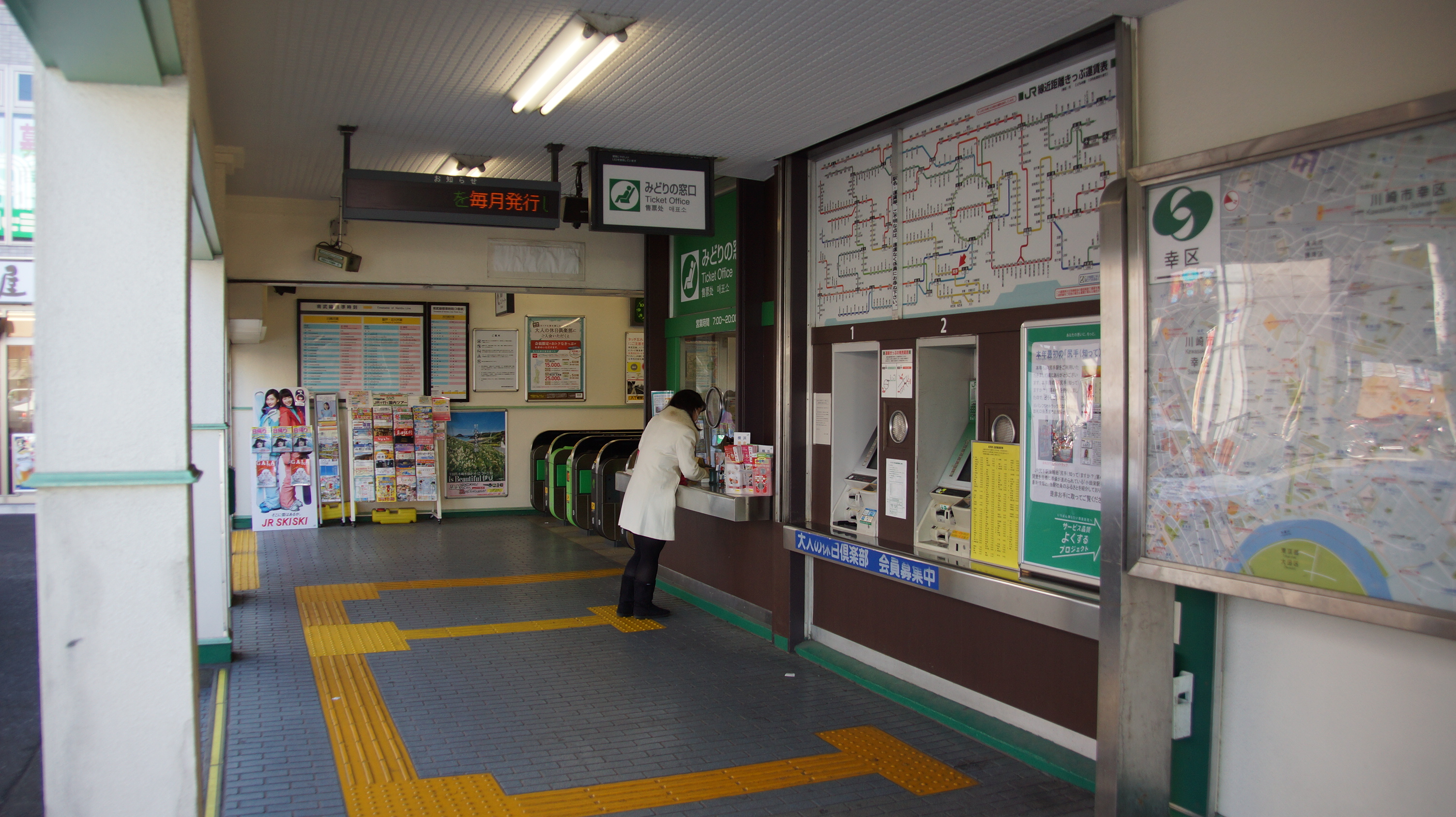
The ticket office and ticket machines in January 2016

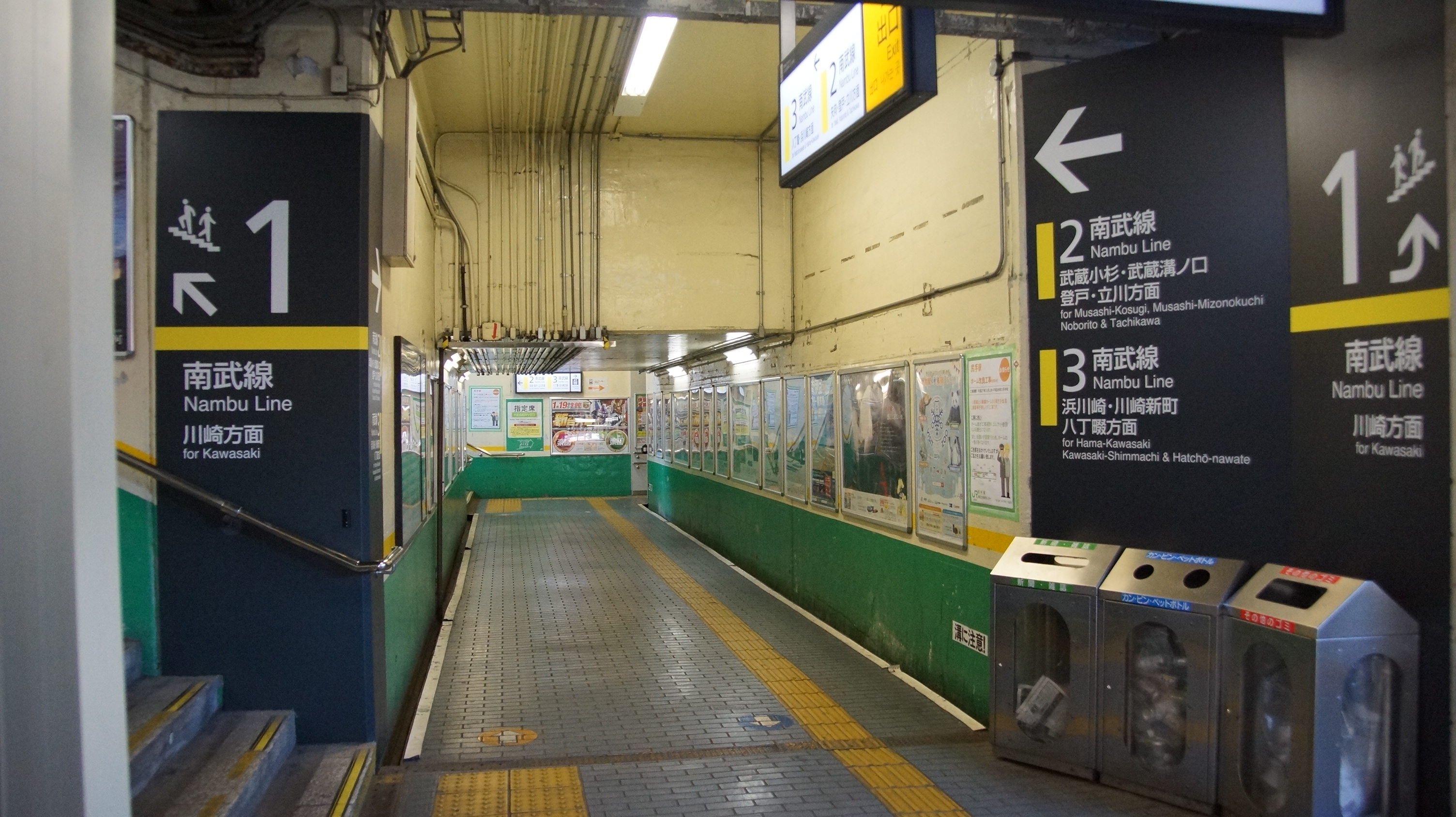
The passageway leading to the platforms in January 2016

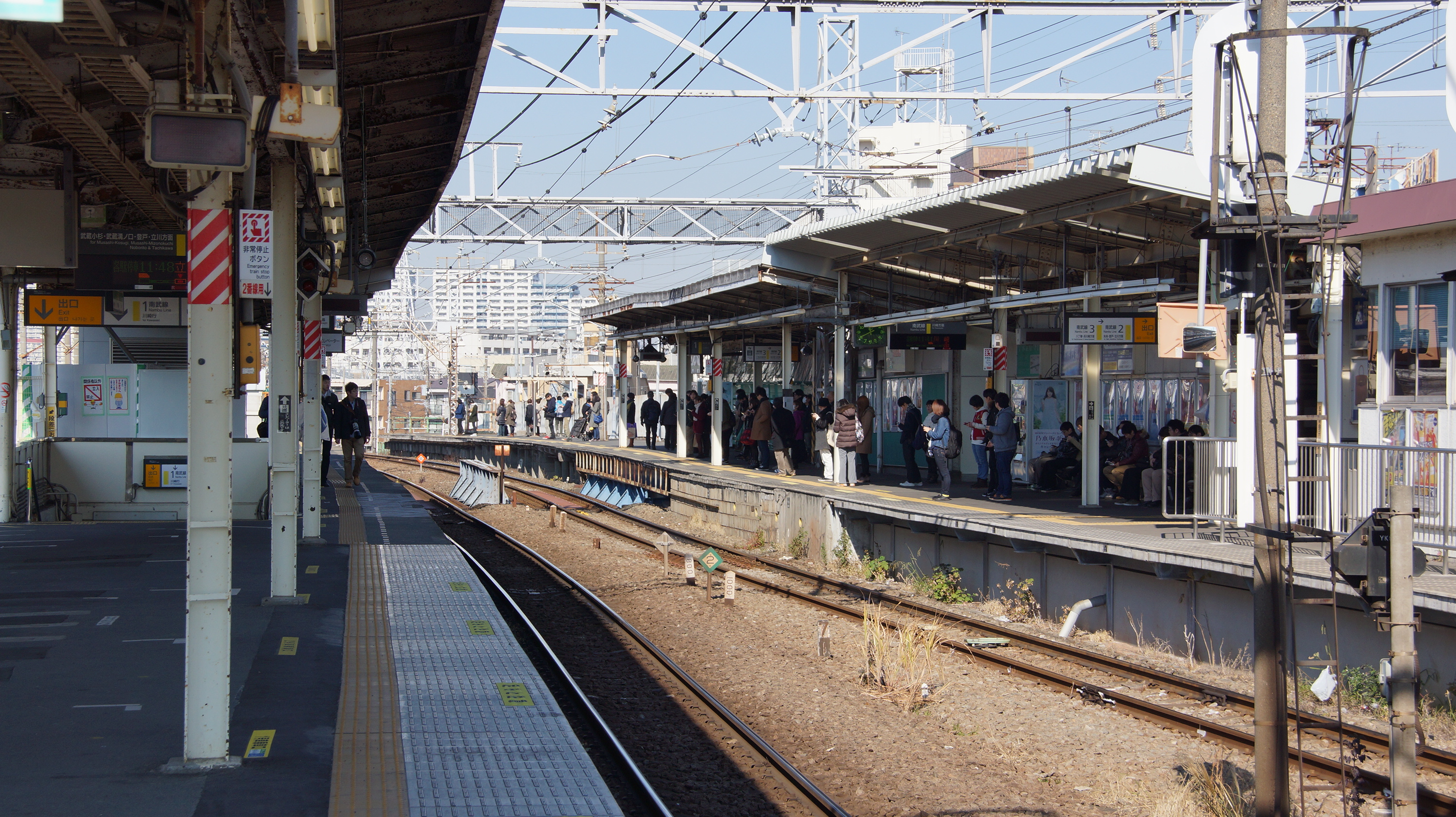
Platform 1 viewed from the south end of platform 2 in January 2016

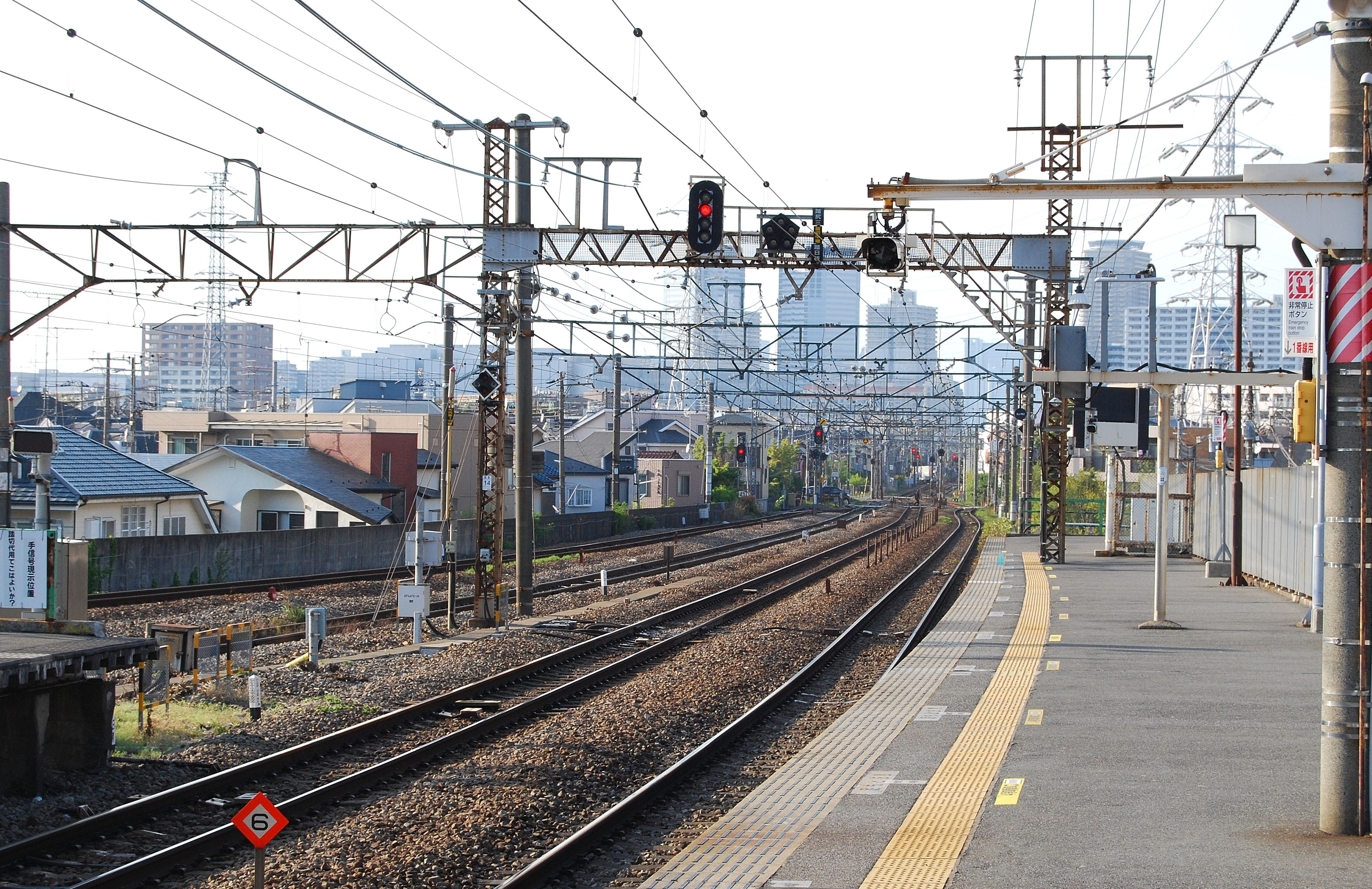
The view looking north from platform 1 in April 2011

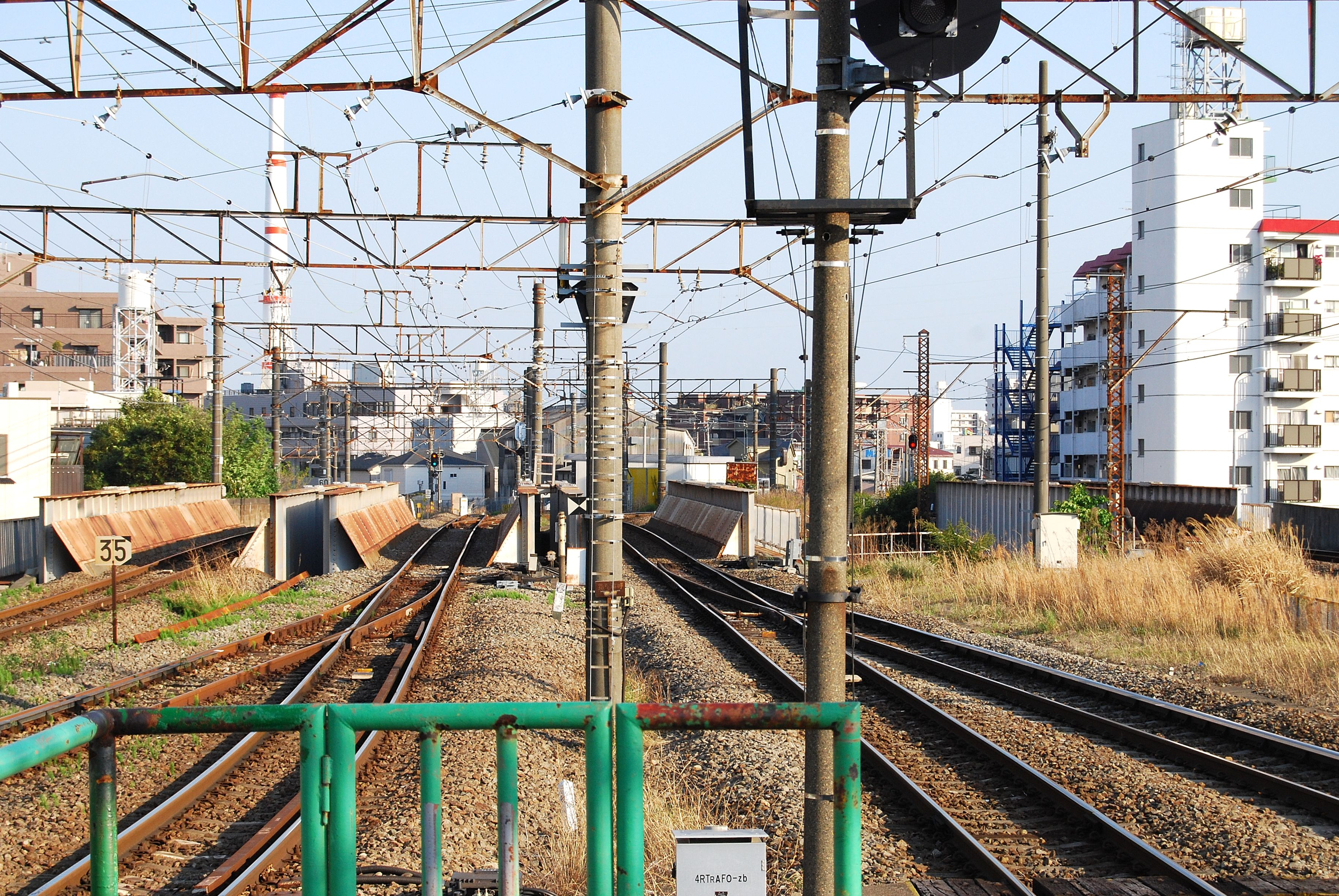
The view looking south from platforms 2/3 in April 2011

== History ==
The station opened on the Nambu Railway on 9 March 1927, initially named Shitte Halt (尻手停留場, Shitte-Teiryūjō). It officially became a full station in 1929. The Nambu Branch Line opened on 25 March 1930, initially as a freight-only line. The Nambu Railway was nationalized on 1 April 1944, becoming part of the Japanese Government Railway (JGR) system, which became the Japanese National Railways (JNR) from 1949. A freight-only spur line to the Shin-Tsurumi Freight Terminal was opened on 1 October 1973 from the line just north of the station. With the privatization of JNR on 1 April 1987, the station came under the control of JR East.

== Passenger statistics ==
In fiscal 2019, the station was used by an average of 15,067 passengers daily (boarding passengers only).

The passenger figures (boarding passengers only) for previous years are as shown below.

| Fiscal year | daily average |
|---|---|
| 2005 | 11,079 |
| 2010 | 11,691 |
| 2015 | 13,702 |

== Surrounding area ==
- Kawasaki City Central Wholesale Market
- Shioda General Hospital
- Hie Shrine
- Shitte Ginza Shopping Street
- Yokohama City Yako Elementary School

== See also ==
- List of railway stations in Japan
