= KiHa 181 series =

Japanese train type

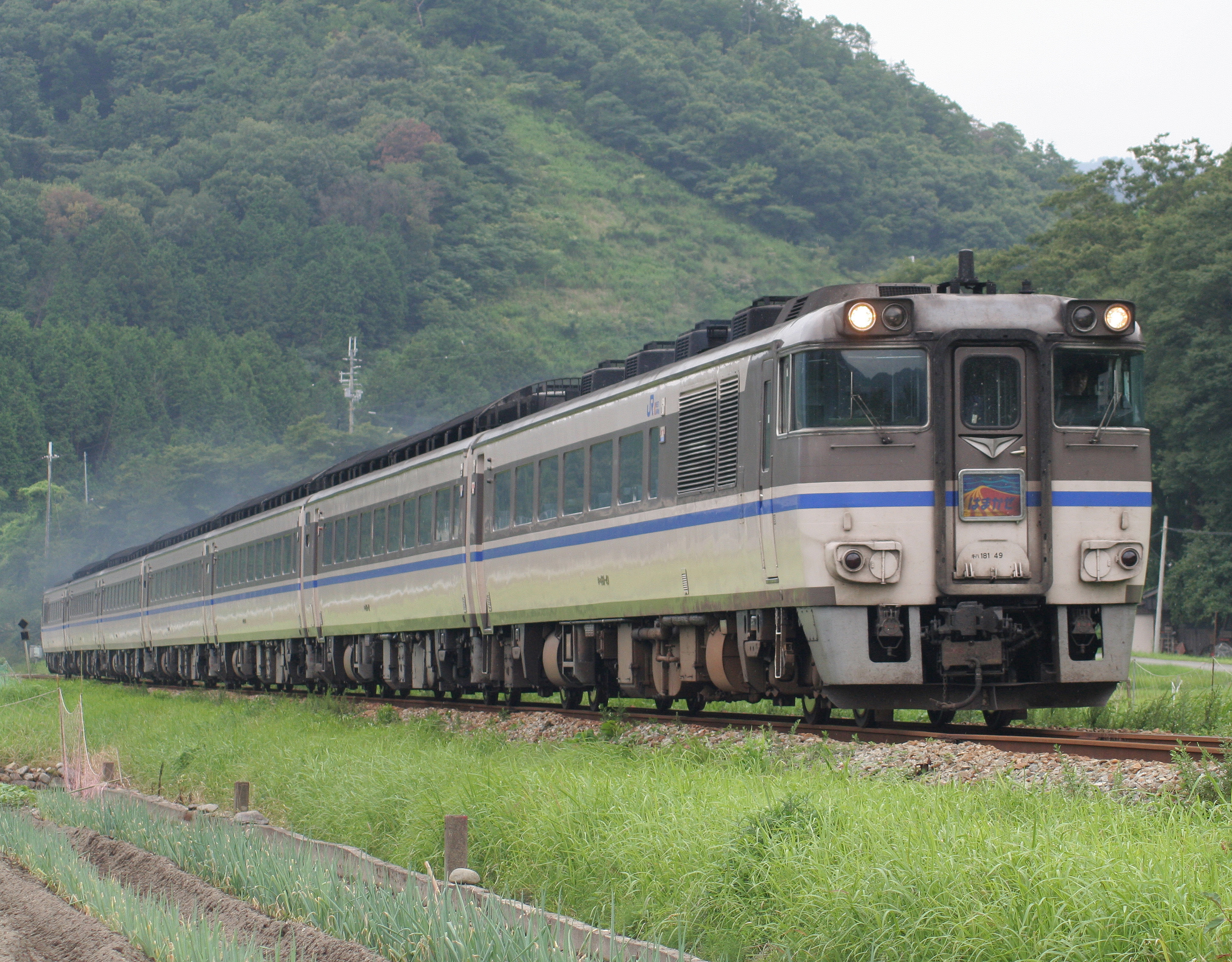
- KiHa 181 series on a Hamakaze service, August 2009
- In service: 1968–December 2010
- Manufacturers: Fuji Heavy Industries, Niigata Tekkō, Nippon Sharyo
- Replaced: KiHa 80 series
- Constructed: 1968–1972
- Number built: 158 vehicles
- Number in service: None
- Number preserved: 3 vehicles
- Successor: KiHa 187 series, KiHa 189 series
- Operators: JNR (1968–1987); JR-West (1987–2010); JR Shikoku (1987–1993); Myanmar Railways (2013–present)

Specifications
- Car body construction: Steel
- Car length: 21,300 mm (69 ft 11 in)
- Width: 2,903 mm (9 ft 6.3 in)
- Height: 3,955 mm (12 ft 11.7 in)
- Doors: One per side
- Maximum speed: 120 km/h (75 mph)
- Prime mover: DML30HSC
- Power output: 500 hp (at 1600 rpm)
- Transmission: Hydraulic
- Bogies: DT40B (driving), TR219B (trailing) (formerly DT36B (driving), TR205B (trailing))
- Braking systems: Engine brake, CLE brake
- Safety system: ATS-S
- Track gauge: 1,067 mm (3 ft 6 in)

The KiHa 181 series (キハ181系, Hyaku-hachijūichi-kei) was a diesel multiple unit (DMU) train type operated in Japan on limited express services between 1968 and 2010. Initially introduced by Japanese National Railways (JNR), the trains were later operated by West Japan Railway Company (JR-West) and Shikoku Railway Company (JR Shikoku) following privatization in 1987.

== Operations ==
The KiHa 181 series was developed for use on limited express services on non-electrified mountainous routes, and was used on services such as the Tsubasa, Shinano, Yakumo, and Hamakaze on the main island of Honshu, and the Shiokaze and Nanpū in Shikoku.

== History ==
A total of 158 KiHa 181 series cars were built between 1968 and 1972. On the privatization of JNR in 1987, JR-West received 94 cars, and JR Shikoku received 44 cars. The KiHa 181 series trains were gradually displaced by the arrival of modern tilting diesel trains and increased electrification, and the last JR Shikoku cars were withdrawn by 1993. The last JR-West cars remained in use on Hamakaze services until November 2010 when they were replaced by new KiHa 189 series DMUs, and were finally withdrawn in December 2010.

== Resale ==
A number of former JR-West KiHa 181 series cars were shipped to Myanmar after they were withdrawn, entering service from January 2013.

== Preserved examples ==
Three KiHa 181 series cars are preserved in Japan.

- KiHa 180 1: Stored at Mino-Ota Depot in Minokamo, Gifu
- KiHa 181 1: Preserved at the SCMaglev and Railway Park in Nagoya
- KiHa 181 12: Preserved at the former Tsuyama Depot in Tsuyama, Okayama
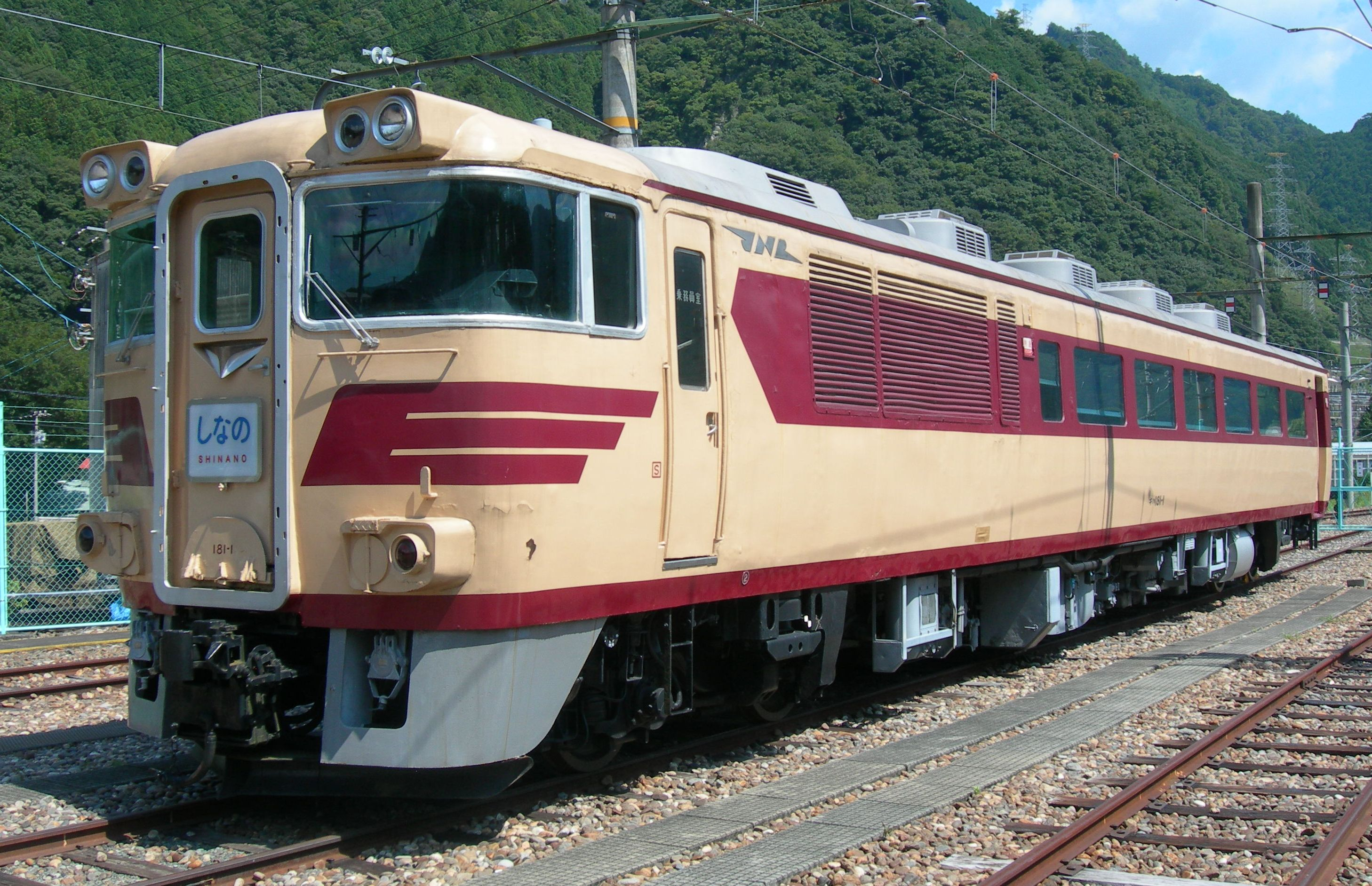
Preserved KiHa 181 1 at Sakuma Rail Park in August 2008 before being later moved

== Interior ==
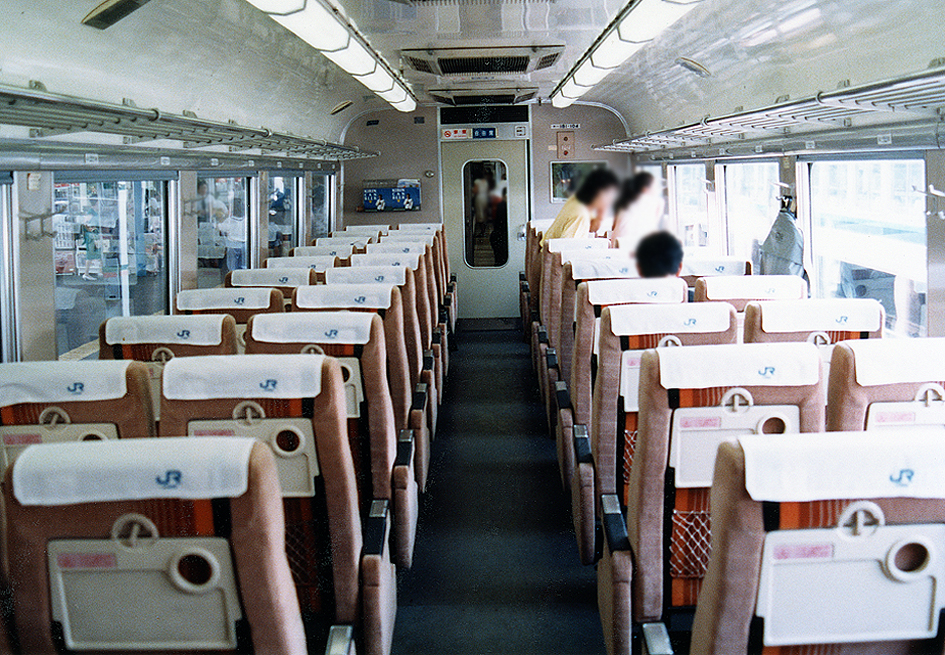
Interior of a 181-104 series in 1988
