= SCMaglev and Railway Park =

Railway museum in Nagoya, Japan

- リニア・鉄道館 ～夢と想い出のミュージアム～
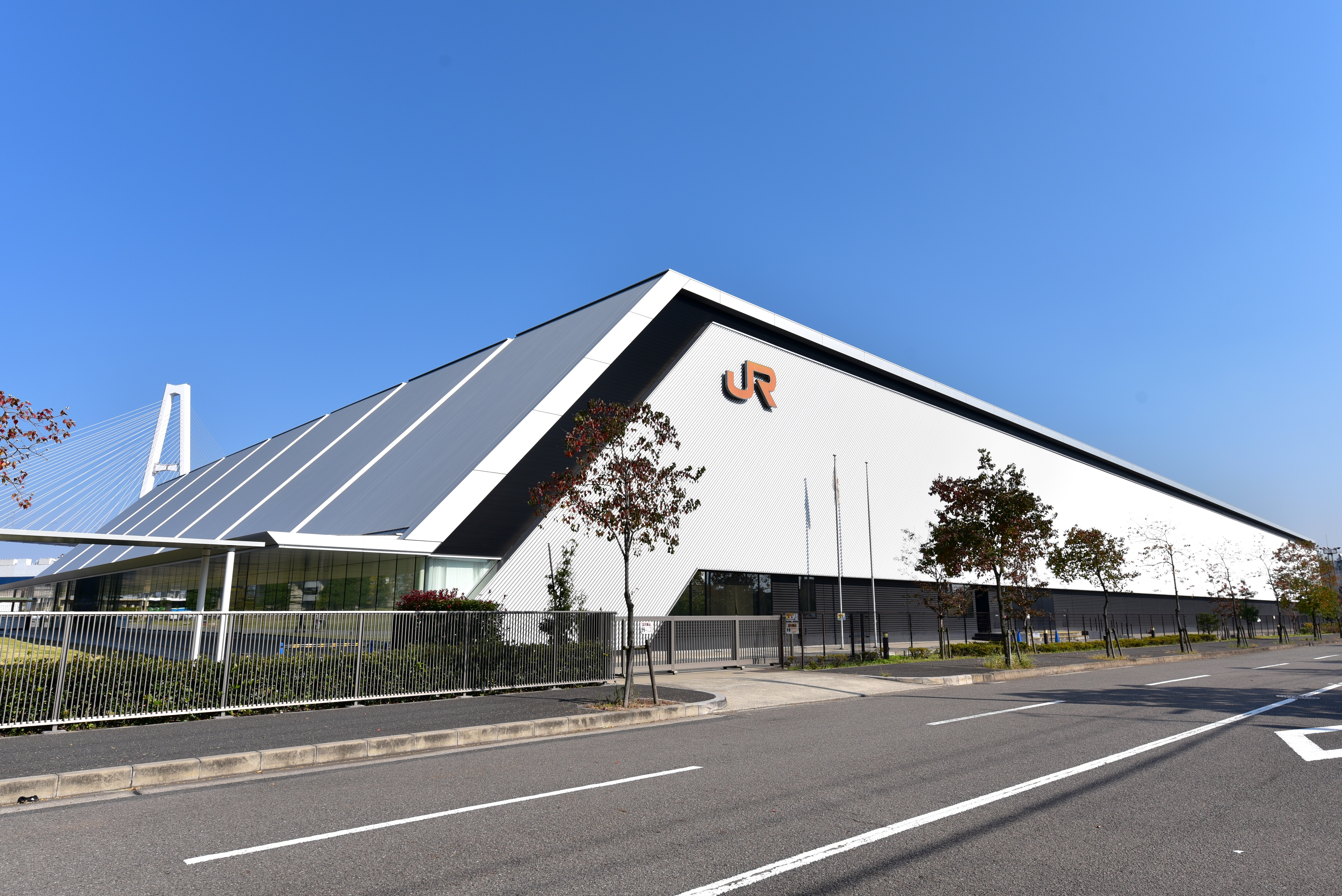
- The museum exterior in December 2014

- Location of the museum SCMaglev and Railway Park (Japan)
- Established: 14 March 2011
- Location: Nagoya, Japan
- Coordinates: 35.049072°N 136.851006°E
- Type: Railway museum
- Public transit access: Kinjō-futō Station
- Website: museum.jr-central.co.jp

The SCMaglev and Railway Park (リニア・鉄道館 ～夢と想い出のミュージアム～, Rinia Tetsudōkan: Yume to Omoide no Myūjiamu; lit. 'Linear Railway Museum: Museum of Dreams and Memories') is a railway museum owned by the Central Japan Railway Company (JR Central) in Nagoya, Japan. The museum opened on 14 March 2011.

The museum features 39 full-size railway vehicles and one bus exhibit, train cab simulators, and model railway dioramas.

== Exhibits ==
The following full-size vehicles are on display.

=== Shinkansen ===
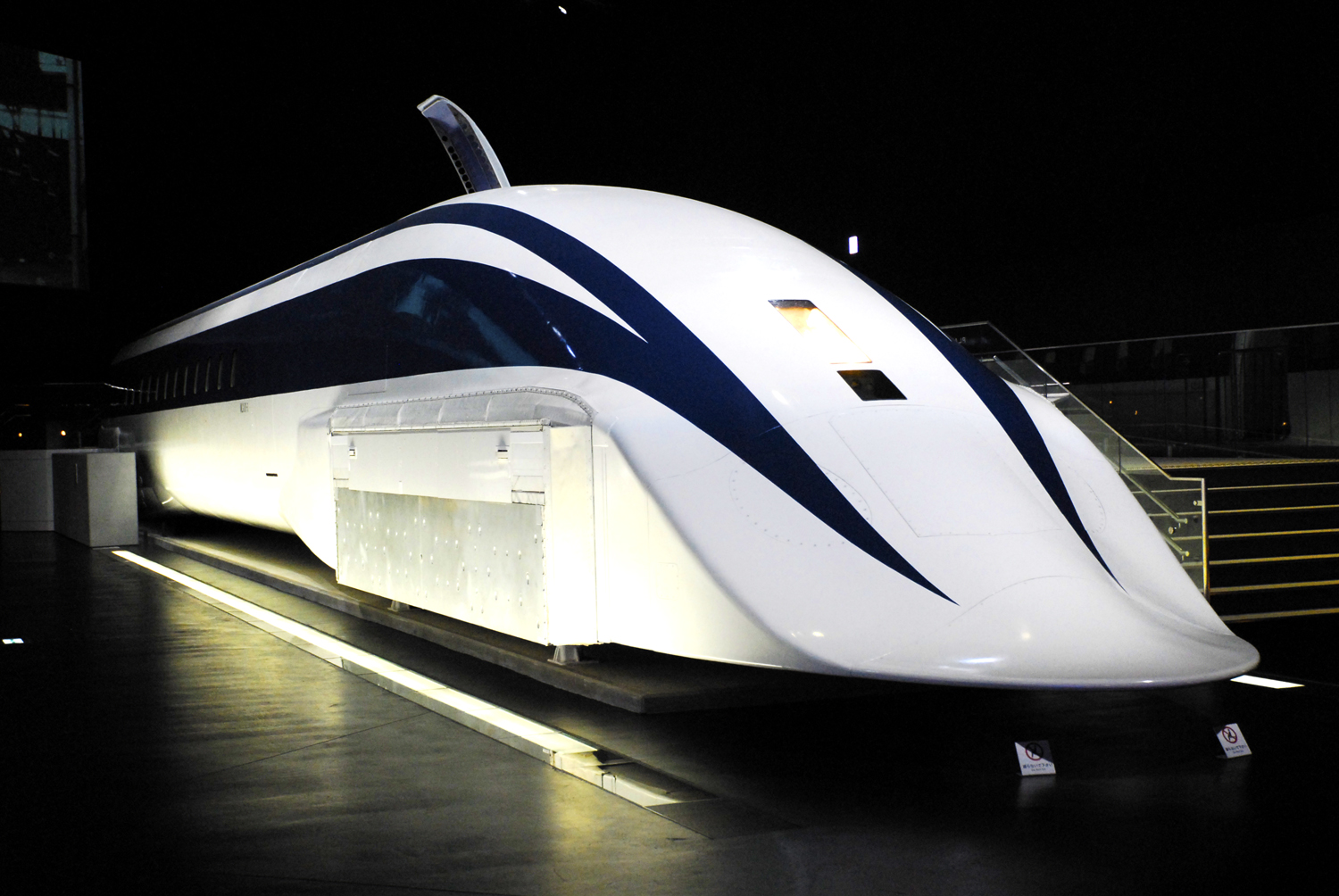
JR–Maglev MLX01-1, April 2013

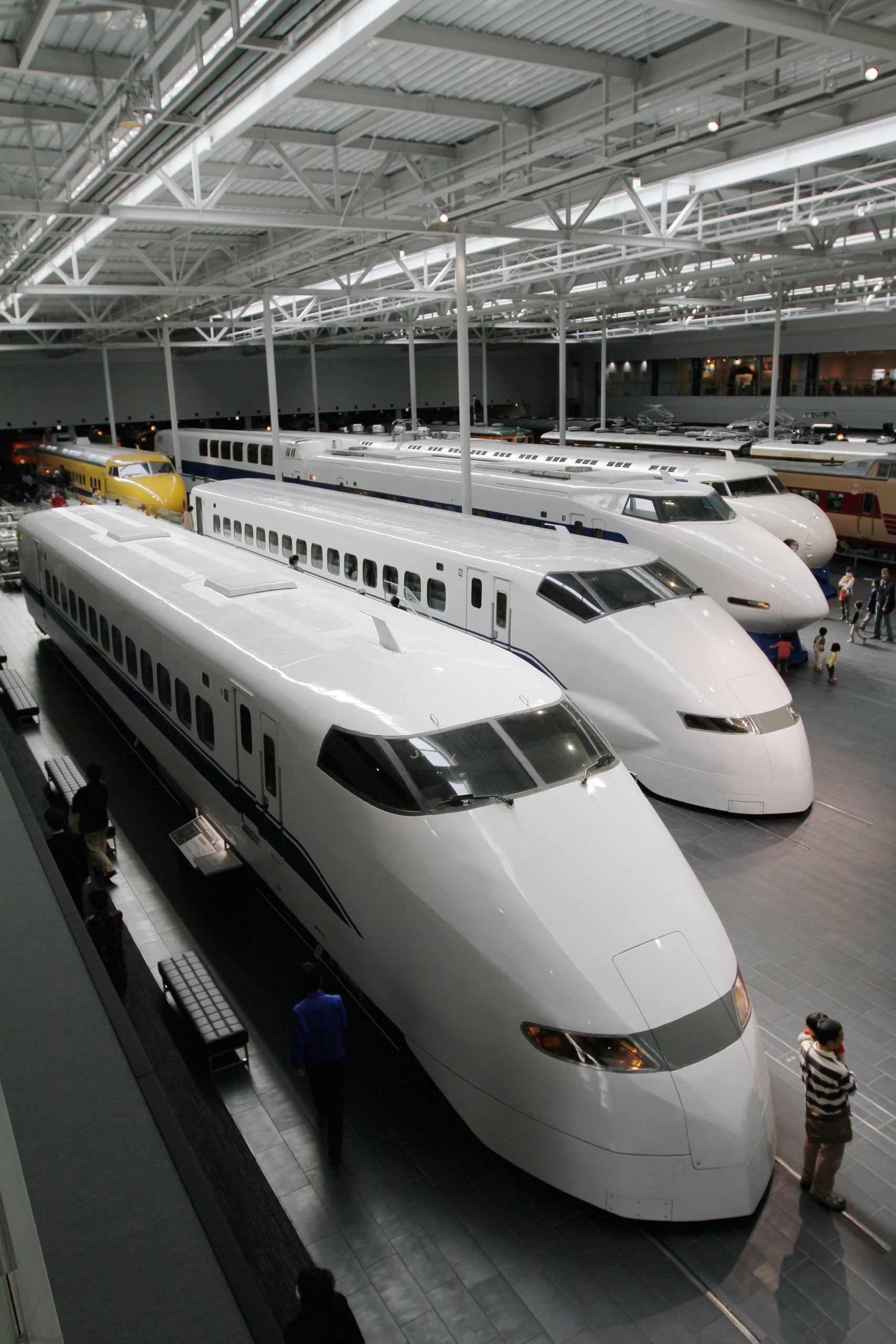
Shinkansen Train Zone, March 2011

- MLX01 SCMaglev car No. MLX01-1 (built 1995 by Mitsubishi Heavy Industries, from JR Research)
- 0 Series Shinkansen car – No. 21-86 (built 1971 by Kisha Seizo, from Hamamatsu Works)
- 0 Series Shinkansen car – No. 16-2034 (built 1986 by Nippon Sharyo, from Hamamatsu Works)
- 0 Series Shinkansen car – No. 36-84 (built 1975 by Hitachi, from Hamamatsu Works)
- 0 Series Shinkansen car – No. 37-2523 (built 1983 by Hitachi, from Hamamatsu Works)
- Class 922 Doctor Yellow car No. 922-26 (built 1979 by Hitachi, from JR West)
- 100 Series Shinkansen car – No. 123-1 (built 1986 by Hitachi, from Hamamatsu Works)
- 100 Series Shinkansen car – No. 168-9001 (built 1985 by Kinki Sharyo, from Hamamatsu Works)
- 300 Series Shinkansen prototype car – No. 322-9001 (built 1990 by Hitachi, from Hamamatsu Works)
- Class 955 "300X" car No. 955-6 (built 1994 by Hitachi, from Hamamatsu Works)
- 700 Series Shinkansen prototype car – No. 723-9001 (ex-set C1, built 1997 by Kawasaki Heavy Industries, on display from 2 January 2014)
- N700 Series Shinkansen prototype car – No. 783-9001 (ex-set X0, built 2005 by Hitachi, on display from 17 July 2019) (displayed outside)
- N700 Series Shinkansen prototype car – No. 775-9001 (ex-set X0, built 2005 by Nippon Sharyo, on display from 17 July 2019, displayed outside)
- N700 Series Shinkansen prototype car – No. 786-9201 (ex-set X0, built 2005 by Nippon Sharyo, on display from 17 July 2019, displayed outside)

=== Locomotives ===
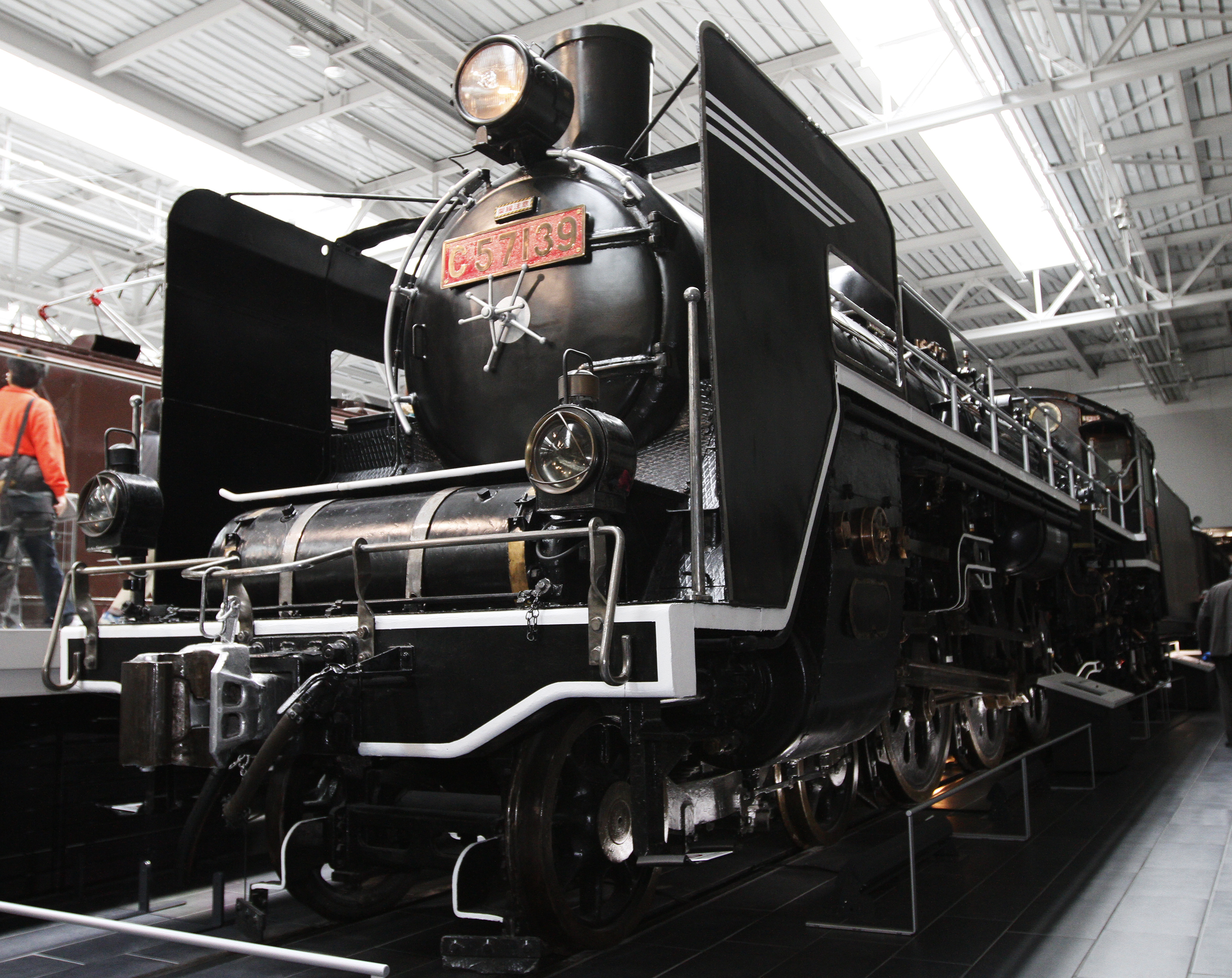
C57 139, March 2011

- Class Ke 90 steam locomotive - No. Ke 90 (built 1918, from Nagoya Training Centre) (displayed outside)
- JNR Class C57 steam locomotive - No. C57 139 (built 1940 by Mitsubishi Heavy Industries, from Nagoya Training Centre)
- JNR Class C62 steam locomotive - No. C62 17 (built 1948 by Hitachi, from Higashiyama Park)
- JNR Class ED11 electric locomotive - No. ED11 2 (built 1922 by General Electric, from Sakuma Rail Park)
- JNR Class ED18 electric locomotive - No. ED18 2 (built 1923 by English Electric, from Hamamatsu Works)
- JNR Class EF58 electric locomotive - No. EF58 157 (built 1957 by Mitsubishi Electric, from Hamamatsu Works)

=== Electric railcars ===
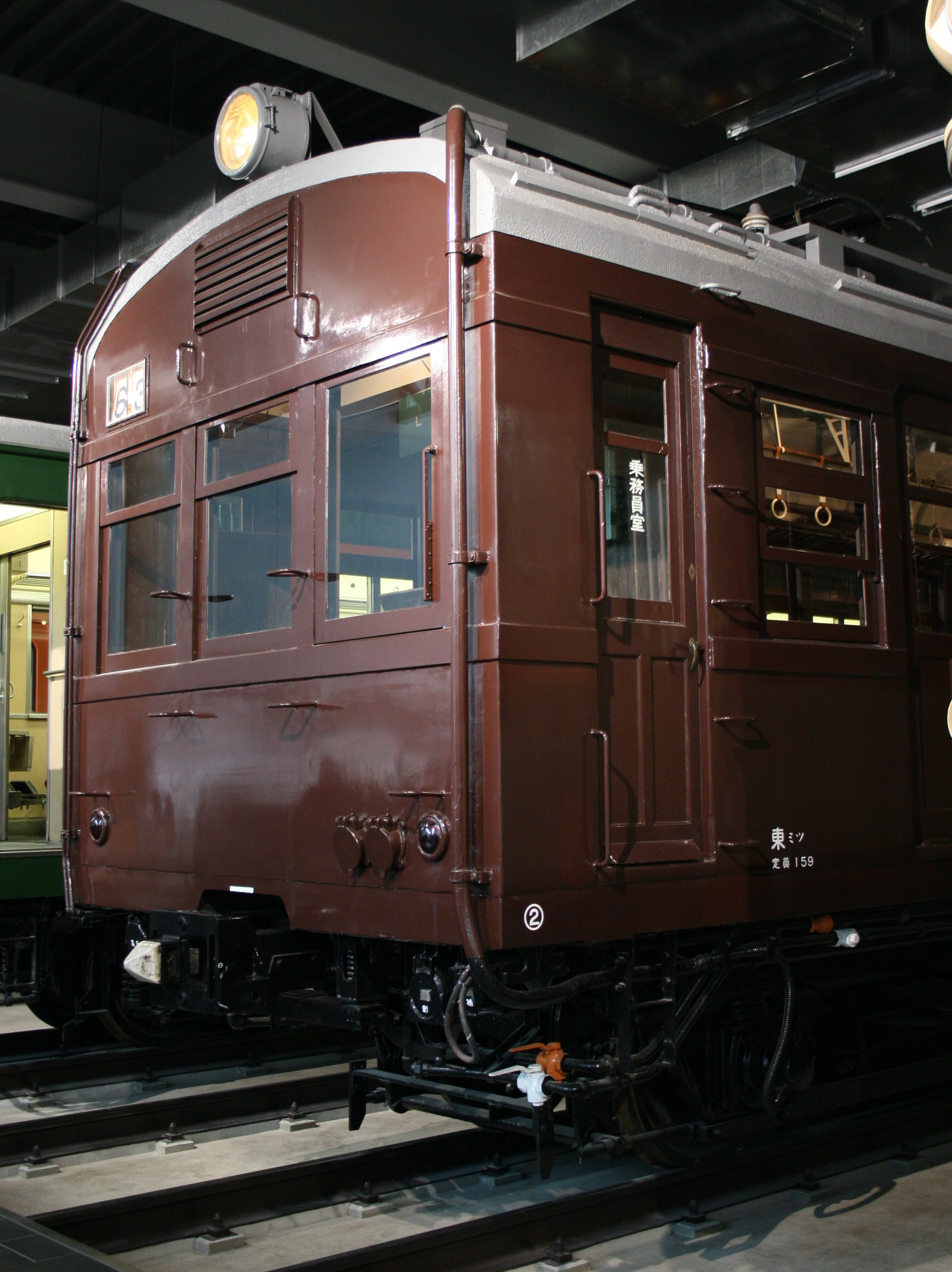
MoHa 63 electric car MoHa 63638, March 2011

- Class MoHa 1 3rd-class electric railcar - No. MoHa 1035 (built 1922 by Kisha Seizo, from Ina-Matsushima Depot)
- KuMoHa 12 electric railcar - No. KuMoHa 12041 (built 1927 by Kisha Seizo, from Ina-Matsushima Depot)
- Class KuMoHa 52 EMU car - No. MoHa 52004 (built 1937 by Kawasaki Sharyo, from Sakuma Rail Park)
- Class MoHa 63 EMU car - No. MoHa 63638 (built 1947 by Kawasaki Sharyo, from Hamamatsu Works)
- 111 series EMU car - No. KuHa 111-1 (built 1962 by Nippon Sharyo, from Sakuma Rail Park)
- 117 series EMU car - KuHa 117-30
- 165 series EMU car - No. KuMoHa 165-108 (built 1966 by Tokyu Car, from Mino-Ōta Depot)
- 165 series EMU car - No. SaRo 165-106 (built 1967 by Teikoku Sharyo, from Hamamatsu Works)
- 381 series EMU car - No. KuHa 381-1 (built 1973 by Kawasaki Heavy Industries, from Mino-Ōta Depot)

=== Diesel railcars ===
- Class KiHa 48000 railcar - No. KiHa 48036 (built 1956 by Tokyu Car, from Sakuma Rail Park)
- Class KiHa 82 DMU car - No. KiHa 82-73 (built 1965 by Nippon Sharyo, from Mino-Ōta Depot)
- KiHa 181 series DMU car - No. KiHa 181-1 (built 1968 by Fuji Heavy Industries, from Sakuma Rail Park)

=== Steam railcars ===
- Class HoJi 6005 steam railcar - No. HoJi 6014 (built 1913 by Kisha Seizo)

=== Passenger carriages ===
- SuNi 30 passenger carriage – No. SuNi 30 95 (built 1929 by Osaka Tekko, from Sakuma Rail Park)
- OYa 31 passenger carriage – No. OYa 31 12 (built 1937 by Nakata Sharyo, from Sakuma Rail Park)
- OHa 35 passenger carriage – No. OHa 35 206 (built 1941 by Nippon Sharyo, from Sakuma Rail Park)
- MaINe 40 sleeping carriage – No. MaINe 40 7 (built 1948 by Nippon Sharyo, from Sakuma Rail Park)
- 43 series passenger carriage – No. SuHa 43 321 (built 1954 by Niigata Tekko)
- 10 series sleeping carriage – No. ORoNe 10 27 (built 1960 by Hitachi, from Sakuma Rail Park)

== Former exhibits ==
- 300 Series Shinkansen car – No. 323-20 (ex-set J21, built 1993 by Nippon Sharyo, from Hamamatsu Works, removed in December 2013)
- 381 series EMU car - No. KuRo 381-11 (built 1974 by Kawasaki Heavy Industries, from Mino-Ōta Depot, removed in June 2019)
- 117 series EMU cars - MoHa 116-59 + KuHa 116-209 (they were displayed outside, removed in June 2019)

== History ==
Construction work started in August 2009, with the first exhibits moved in from July 2010. The museum opened on 14 March 2011.

On 29 January 2012, a small ceremony was held to mark the one millionth visitor to the museum.

== See also ==
- Kyoto Railway Museum (JR West museum in Kyoto)
- Railway Museum (Saitama) (JR East museum in Saitama Prefecture)
