= Sakuragichō train fire =

1951 railway accident in Yokohama, Japan

Coordinates: 35°27′12″N 139°37′44″E

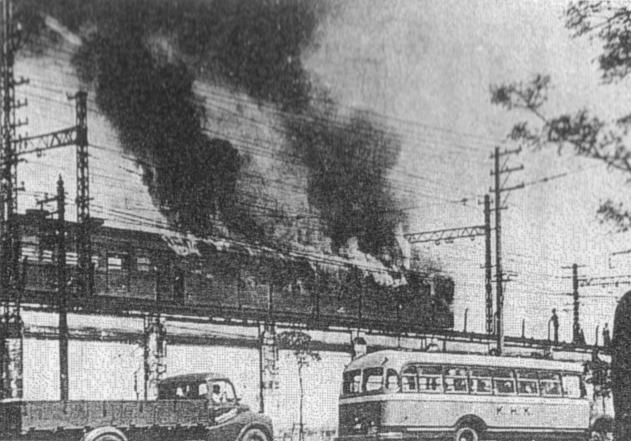
- The first carriage on fire

Details
- Date: April 24, 1951; 75 years ago 13:42
- Location: Sakuragichō Station
- Country: Japan
- Line: Keihin Line
- Operator: Japanese National Railways
- Incident type: Fire
- Cause: Overhead wire maintenance error

Statistics
- Trains: 1
- Deaths: 106
- Injured: 92

The Sakuragichō train fire (桜木町事故, Sakuragichō jiko) occurred on April 24, 1951, when a 63 series Keihin Line (now part of the Negishi Line) train approaching Sakuragichō Station in Yokohama hit a loose overhead wire causing a short circuit and starting a fire which killed 106 people and injured 92.

== Accident ==
On the day in question, maintenance crews were renewing the electrical insulators of the overhead wires when at 1:38 PM a hanging wire (from which the contact wire is suspended) was accidentally cut allowing the contact wire to hang down. Four minutes later, a 5-car MoHa 63 series train (1271B) approached from Yokohama Station and changed lines 50 metres before Sakuragichō but the pantograph of the leading carriage became tangled in the hanging contact wire. The driver attempted to lower the pantograph, but it fell sideways and hit the wooden carriage, causing sparks which started a fire on the roof that rapidly spread to the rest of the carriage.

The 150 people travelling in the carriage were unable to open the electrically operated doors. The connecting door to the second carriage only opened inwards, impossible with the crowd of panicking passengers inside. Finally, the windows of the carriage were too small to escape through: 63 series cars, of wartime design, employed many cost-cutting measures, one of which was a three-pane window design, where only lower and upper panes could be opened. Intended to escape an expense of a large, full-sized glass pane, this design left the openings too small to pass through. The passengers were therefore trapped; the first car, constructed soon after World War II of combustible materials (another cost-cutting measure was the wooden roof of these cars), was completely consumed by fire within ten minutes, killing 106 people and injuring 92 more.

== Response ==
The investigation report resulted in improved fire-proofing of all such carriages and the provision of through-corridors between carriages. Although the electrically operated doors had manual overrides positioned under the passenger seats, this was poorly signed. The report resulted in their being marked with red signage.

This accident also caused the resignation of Hideo Shima, director of the railway's rolling stock department, in 1951. Shima was later employed with Japanese National Railways in 1955 to design and build Japan's first "bullet train" (Shinkansen).

A monument to the accident victims was subsequently built at Sōji-ji in Tsurumi-ku, Yokohama.

== See also ==
- List of transportation fires

== Sources ==
- Train Fire at Sakuragi-cho
