= 52 series =

Japanese electric multiple unit train type

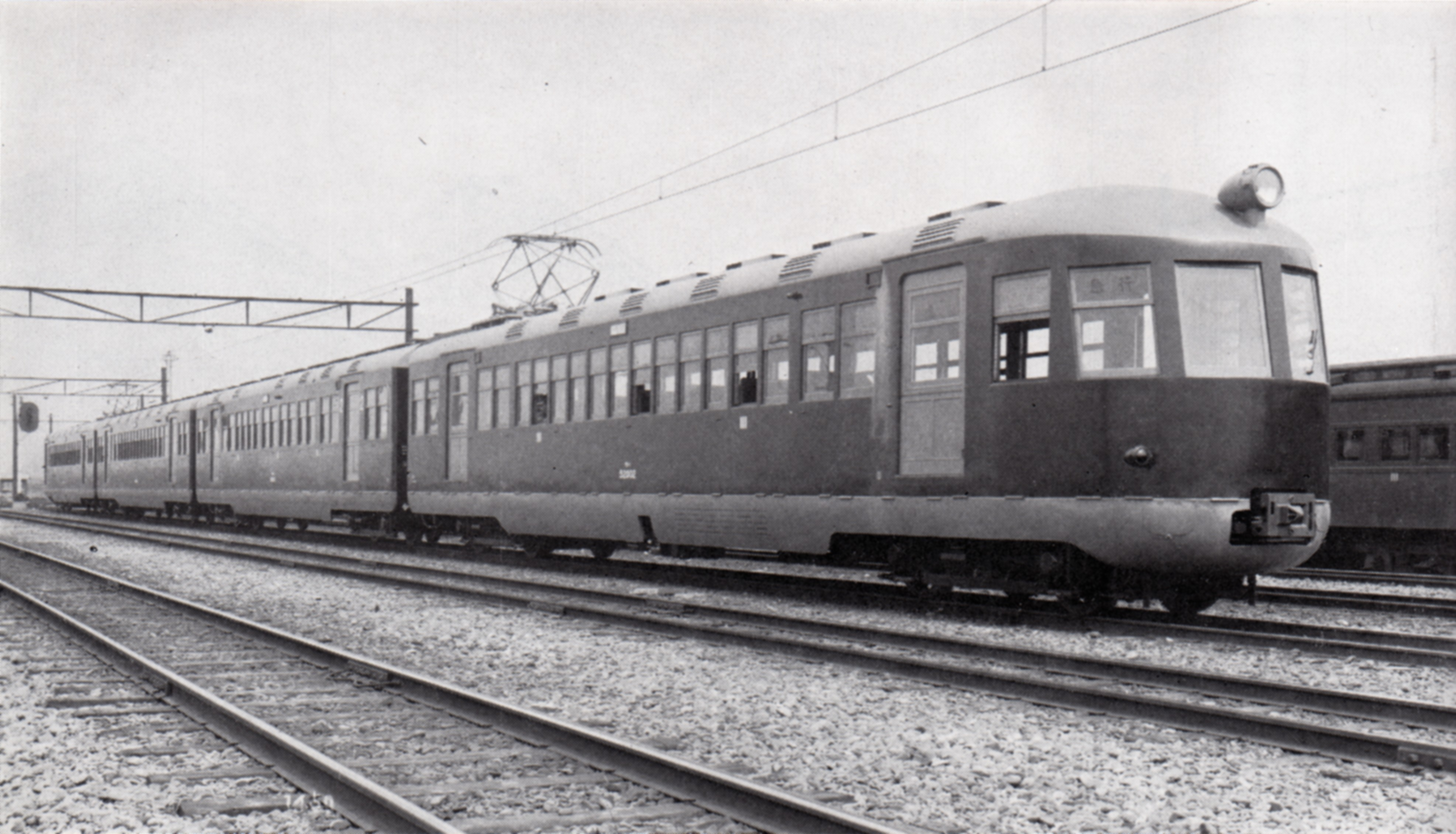
- JGR Moha-52 electric multiple unit, first model, at Miyahara in 1936
- In service: 1936-1983
- Manufacturers: Kawasaki Heavy Industries, Nippon Sharyo
- Constructed: 1936-1937
- Entered service: 1936
- Number built: 20 vehicles
- Number preserved: 2 vehicles
- Operators: JGR, JNR

The 52 series (52系) EMUs were manufactured in 1936-1937 in 3 batches and operated by Japanese Government Railways (JGR, later JNR) for use on the Hanwa Line, and later used on the San'yō Main Line, JR Kobe Line, JR Kyoto Line in the Kansai region and the Iida Line in Nagano Prefecture, Japan. The trains were developed from the 42 series EMUs.

The 52 series EMUs were retired between 1976 and 1983.

== Preserved examples ==
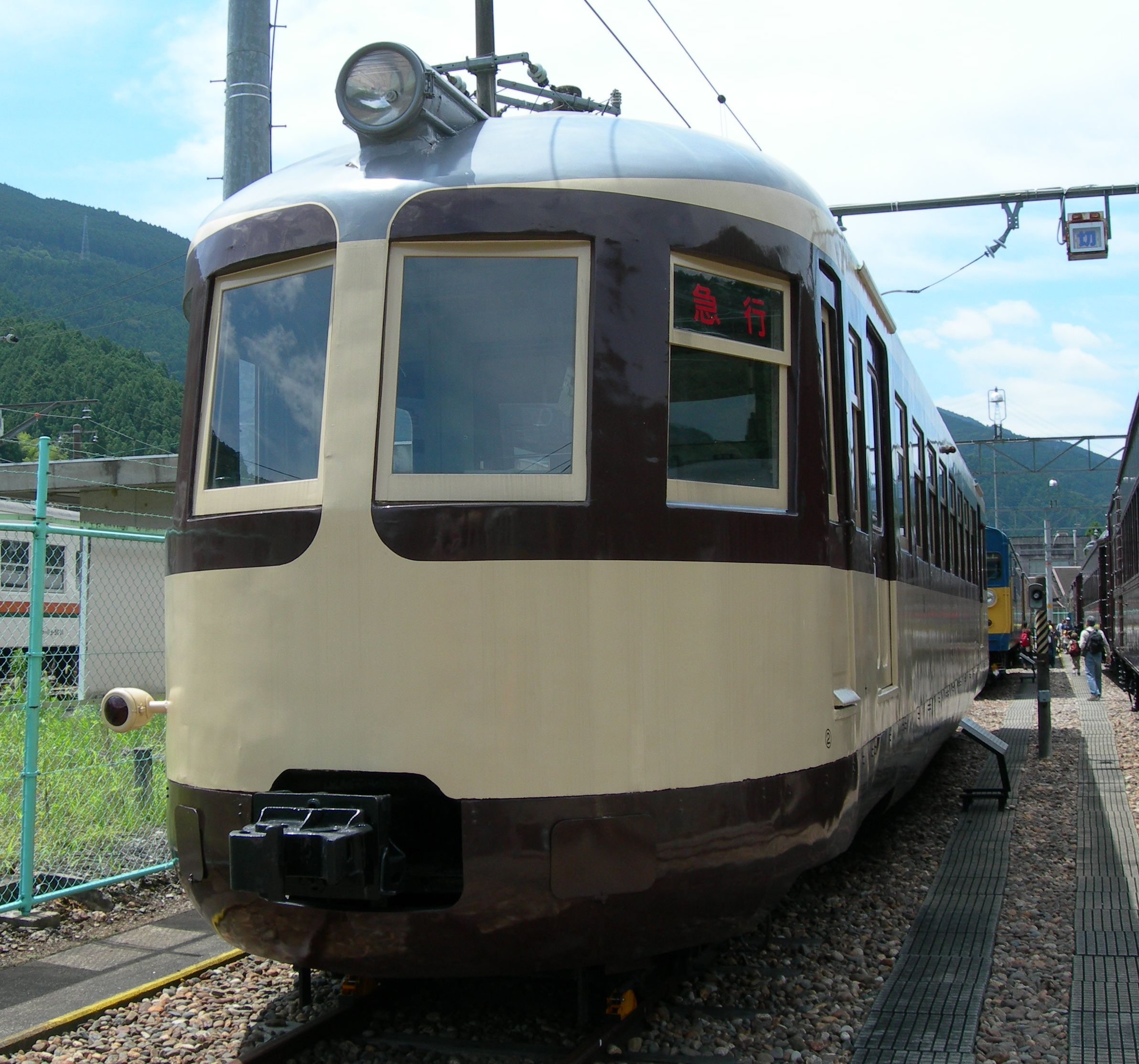
Preserved 52 series carriage KuMoHa 52004 at Sakuma Rail Park, April 2009

- KuMoHa 52001: Suita Depot, Osaka
- KuMoHa 52004: (built in 1937 by Kawasaki Sharyo), SCMaglev and Railway Park, Nagoya.
