= 72 series =

Japanese train type

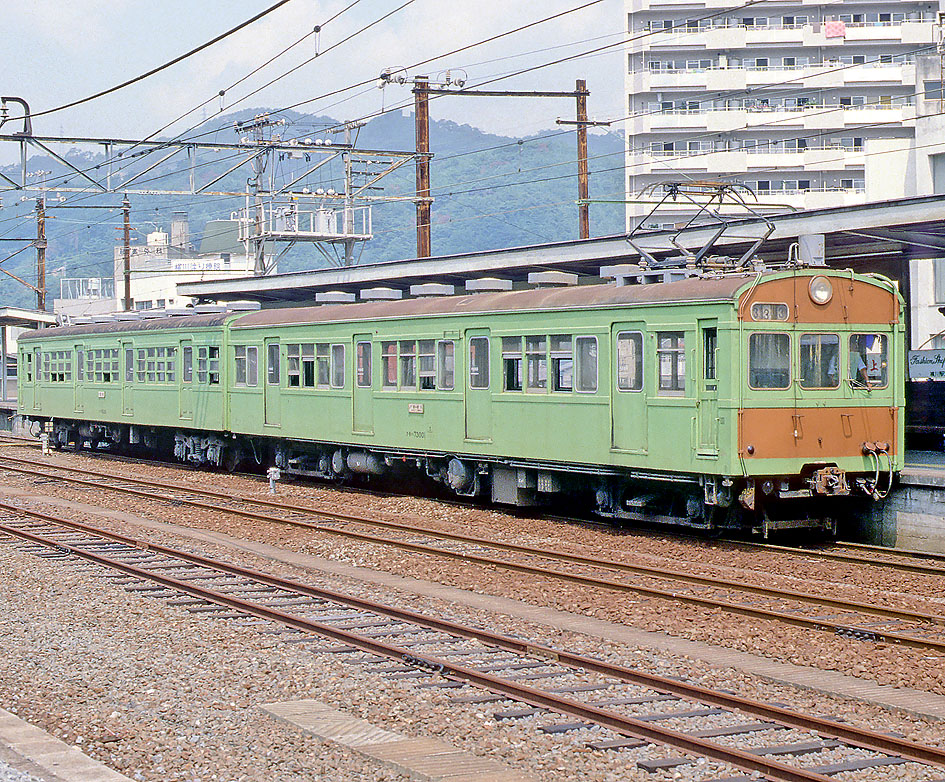
- A JNR 72 series train on the Kabe Line at Yokogawa Station in July 1984
- In service: 1954–1985
- Manufacturers: JNR Niitsu Works, Hitachi, Kawasaki Heavy Industries, Kinki Sharyo, Kisha Seizō, Nippon Sharyo, Teikoku Sharyo, Tokyu Car
- Replaced: 63 series
- Constructed: 1952–1958
- Entered service: 1954; 1972 (72-970 series)
- Number built: c. 1,450 vehicles
- Successor: 101 series
- Operator: JNR (1954–1985)
- Line served: Various

Specifications
- Car length: 20 m (65 ft 7 in)
- Doors: 4 per side
- Maximum speed: 95 km/h (59 mph); 100 km/h (62 mph) for mail coach conversions
- Traction system: Resistor control MT40
- Electric system: 1,500 V DC overhead catenary
- Current collection: Pantograph
- Safety systems: Originally not fitted, later ATS-B and ATS-S
- Track gauge: 1,067 mm (3 ft 6 in)

The 72 series (72系) trains were DC electric commuter trains operated by Japanese National Railways (JNR), and served as the basis for the 101 series. The 72 series included the main production batch of 490 vehicles as well as 667 former 63 series cars converted into 72 series between 1953 and 1955. The last remaining trains were withdrawn in 1985, although some cars which were converted into mail coaches and experimental vehicles continued to remain in service until 1996. Most 72 series trains were converted to four-car 72–970 series trains, with the body based on the 103 series with the raised cab. The 72–970 series remained in service until 1985 when they were converted to 103–3000 series for the Kawagoe Line.

== Variants ==
- 72 series - introduced in 1954, produced from 1952 to 1958
- 72–970 series - later converted to 103-3000 series
- Kumoha 73 - cab car (about 330 vehicles built)
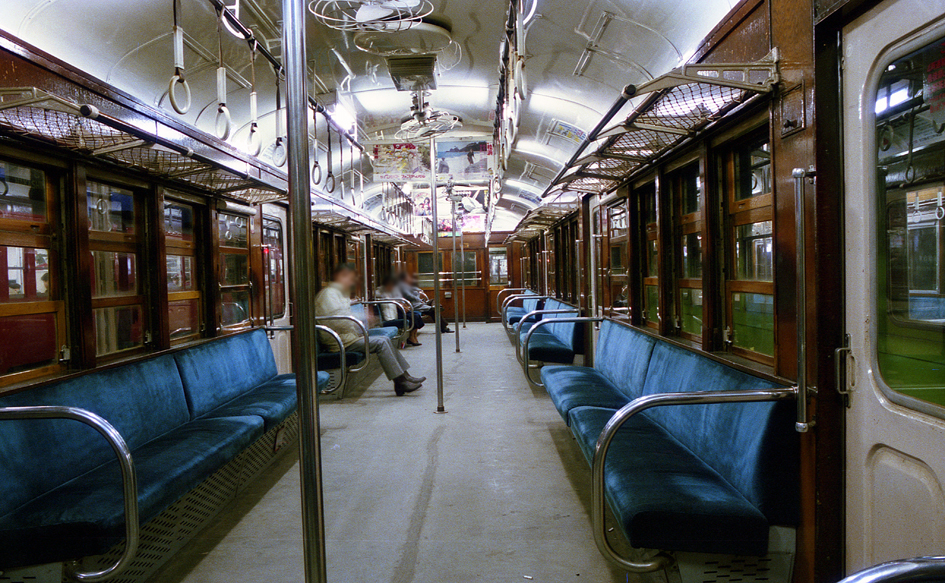
Interior view of Kuha 79446

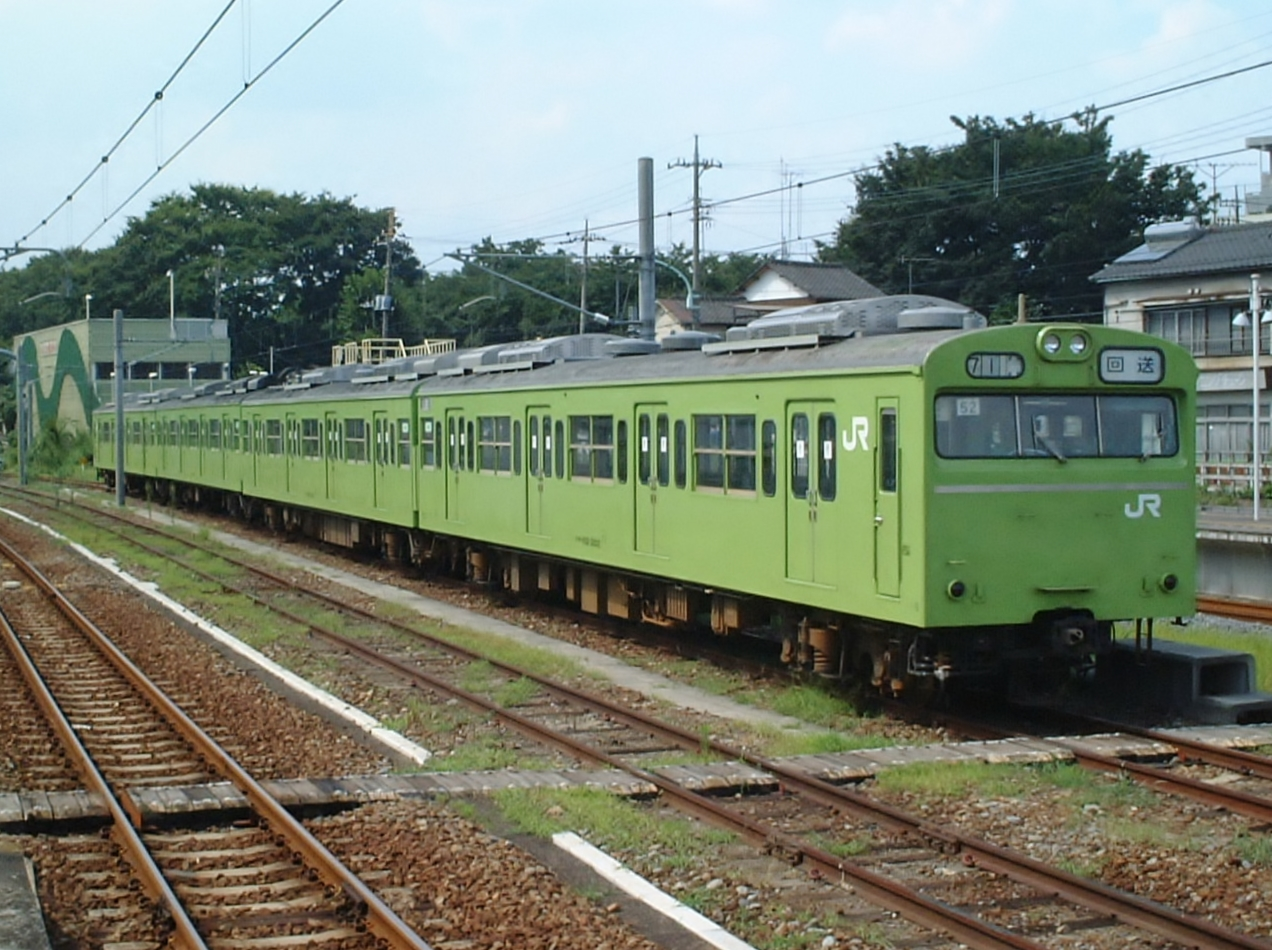
Kawagoe Line 103–3000 series set 52 stabled at Haijima Station

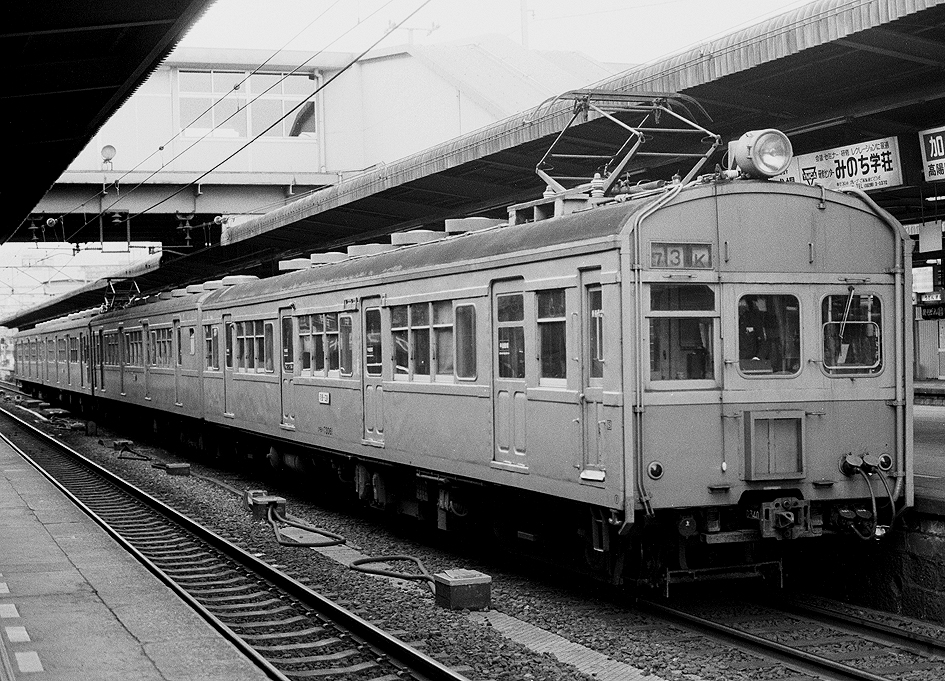
Kumoha 73061

== Operations ==
72 series trains were in service on the Ome Line from 1961 until 1978, and on the Kabe Line from 1976 until 1984. Type 73 (73形) trains were in service on the Ome Line, Nambu Line, Yokohama Line, and Tsurumi Line.

== Preserved examples ==
- KuMoHa 73383: Privately preserved in Saeki, Hiroshima. Restored in October 2013, awaiting move to Yanahara Fureai Mine Park.
- KuMoYa 90005: Stored at JR Central Hamamatsu Depot.
- KuMoYa 90801 (partial): Preserved at the JR East Railway Museum in Saitama.
- KuMoNi 83006: Used at the Toshiba factory in Fuchu, Tokyo.
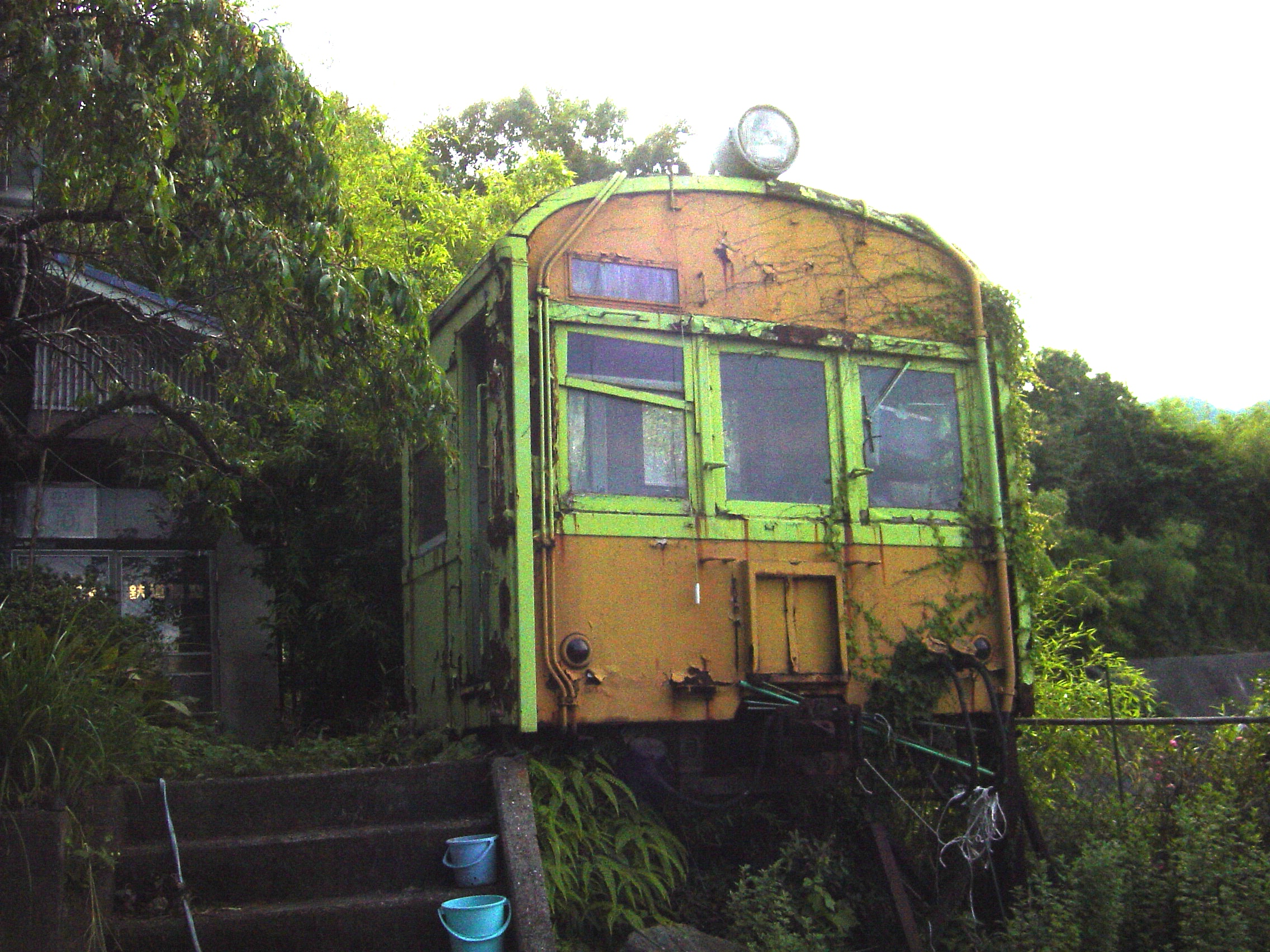
KuMoHa 73383 in Saeki, Hiroshima, June 2004

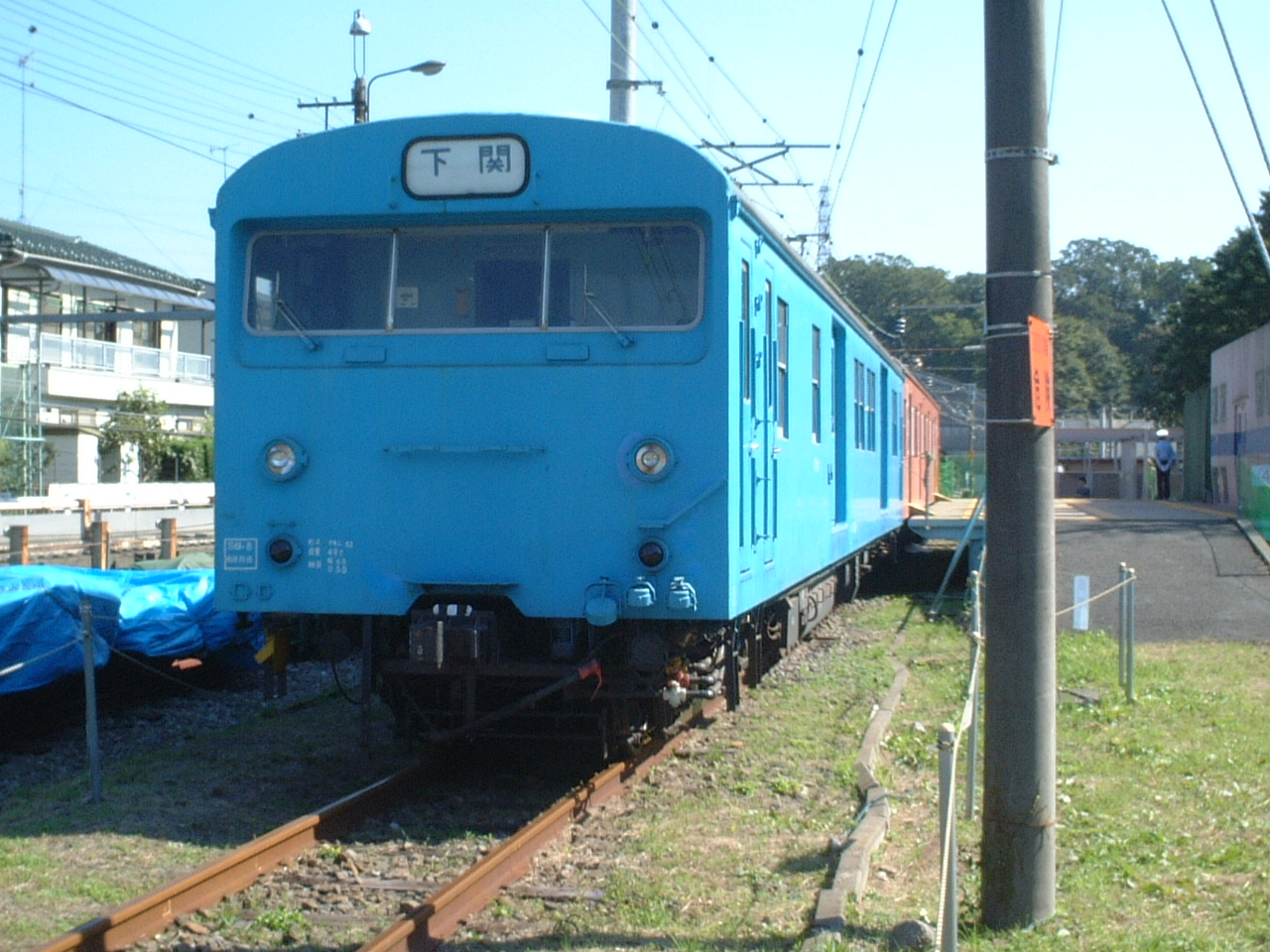
KuMoNi 83006 at the RTRI facility in Kokubunji, Tokyo, October 2001

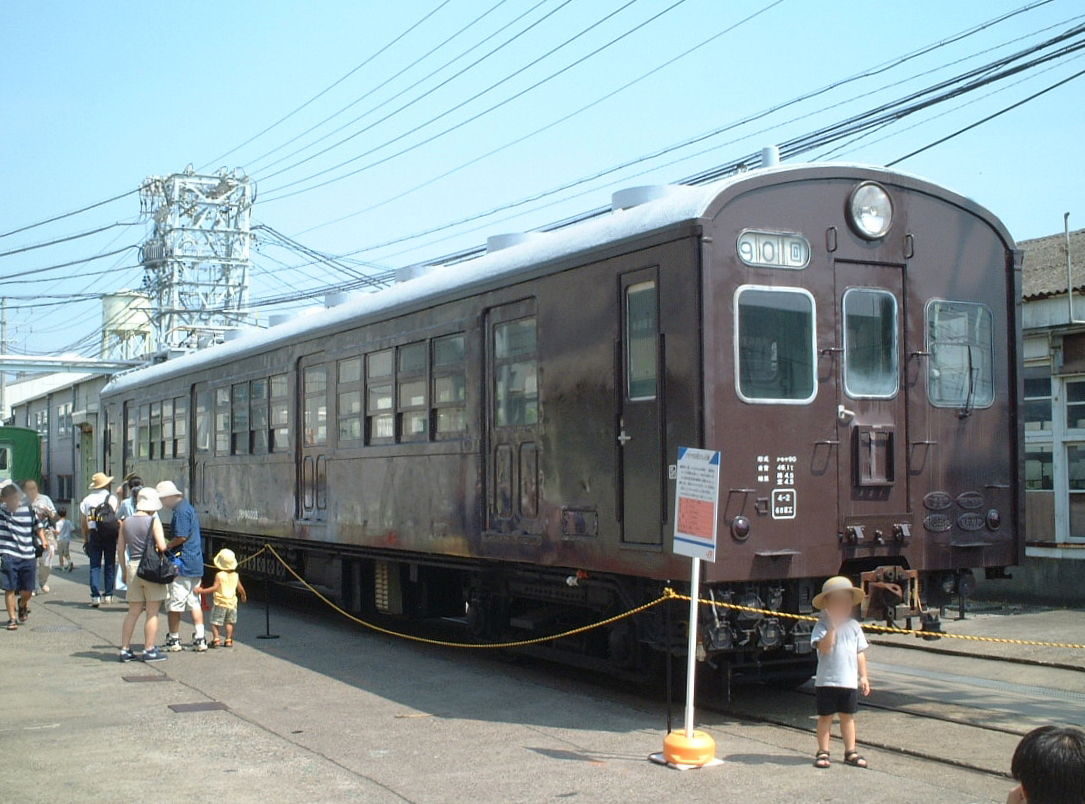
KuMoYa 90005 at JR Central Hamamatsu Works, August 2001
