= 63 series =

Japanese electric multiple unit train type

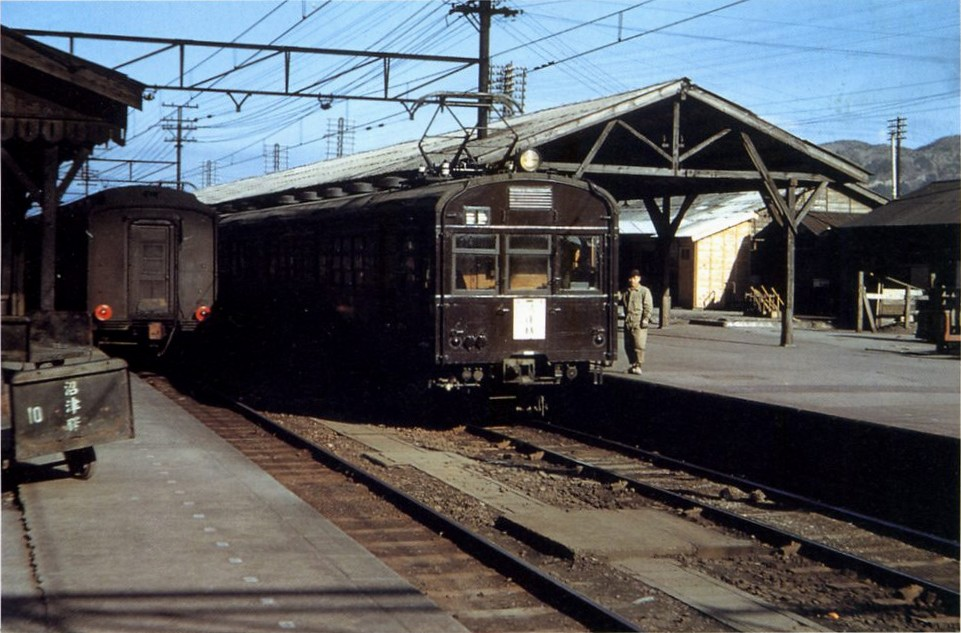
- a 63 series EMU on Numazu Station in 1946
- In service: 1944–1963
- Manufacturers: JNR, Kawasaki Sharyo, Kinki Sharyo, Nippon Sharyo, Tanaka Sharyo
- Built at: Ōi, Ōmiya
- Constructed: 1944–1950
- Number built: 688 vehicles
- Number preserved: 1 vehicle (as of April 2011)
- Operators: JGR (1944-1949); JNR (1949-1963); Kinki Nippon Railway (20 vehicles); Nagoya Railroad (20 vehicles); Nankai Railway (20 vehicles); Odakyu Electric Railway (20 vehicles); Sagami Railway (10 vehicles); Sanyo Electric Railway (14 vehicles); Tobu Railway (40 vehicles)
- Line served: Various

Specifications
- Car body construction: Steel aluminium alloy (MoHa 63900-63902, SaHa 78200-78202)
- Traction system: Resistor control
- Traction motors: MT30 (-1948); MT40A & MT40B (1948-)
- Transmission: Cam shaft
- Electric system: 1,500 V
- Bogies: DT12 (TR25), DT13, DT14, DT15
- Track gauge: 1,067 mm (3 ft 6 in); 1,435 mm (4 ft 8 1/2 in)(Sanyo Electric Railway)

The 63 series (63系) (and its generic offshoots) was a commuter electric multiple unit operated by Japanese Government Railways (JGR) and Japanese National Railways (JNR). The cars that made up the 63 series were numbered as MoHa 63, SaHa 78 and KuHa 79.

== Background ==
The 63 series was originally introduced in 1944 as a means of transporting increasing number of workers commuting to factories of arms and other industries. Between 1944 and 1945, very few of these trains were in production, therefore postwar construction of these trains increased dramatically. These trains had brown, steel bodies. The cars were designed under the overall goal of mass transportation amid the serious shortage of supply in the wartime. This resulted in long body (20 meters (65 ft 7 in)), many doors (four per side), less seating, lack of ceiling and new design of side windows (consisting of three frames: only upper and lower frames can be opened).

=== Postwar variants ===
In 1946, Kawasaki Heavy Industries began further production of the 63 series trains. This version had an aluminium alloy body instead of the steel body in war-time 63 series trains. Interior flooring was wood, luggage racks were installed, and seats were upholstered. However, the aluminium alloy used in exterior construction was easily prone to corrosion and the electrical systems were also prone to short-circuiting.

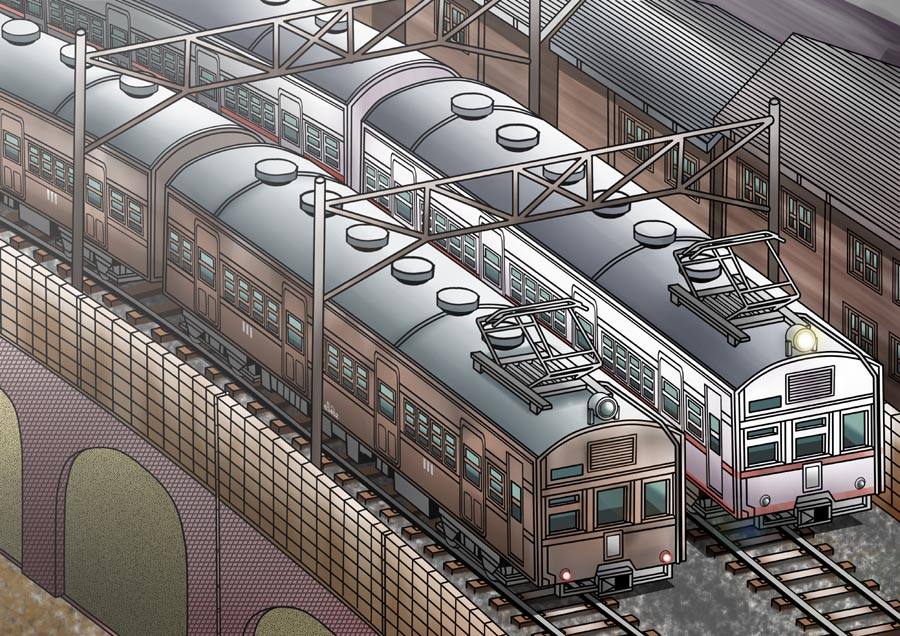
a rendered reconstruction picture of 63 series sets made from steel (on the left) and from aluminium alloy (on the right)

As a result of the loss of railways and rolling stock during World War II to supply steel for the war effort, demand for railway transportation was so great that some 63 series trains (120 vehicles) had to be supplied to private railway operators in Japan. Examples were Tobu Railway (40 vehicles), Kinki Nippon Railway (20 vehicles, classified as MoHa 1501) and Nagoya Railroad (20 vehicles, classified as 3700 series).

== Later years ==
The effects of substandard construction on the 63 series were already noticeable by the 1950s. Worn-out bodies made the trains look ugly and the effects of short-circuit was shown in the Sakuragichō train fire that happened on the Keihin Line (now Negishi Line) on April 24, 1951, by which 92 people were injured and 106 were killed. The three-frame windows with small opening prevented passengers evacuation from the fire.

The 63 series trainsets were also easily prone to accidents, and a lot of train crashes, derailments and incidents happened in JNR-managed railways and private railways. The Mitaka incident of 1949 was also caused by an unmanned 63 series trainset.

In 1954, the successor to the 63 series, the 72 series, was introduced. Despite (originally) having exactly the same design as the 63 series, the 72 series had a much better quality of construction and served as a model for all future commuter trains in Japan, including the 101 and 103 series. From 1963 onwards, remaining 63 series trainsets were retrofitted and integrated into the 72 series trainsets.

== Preserved examples ==
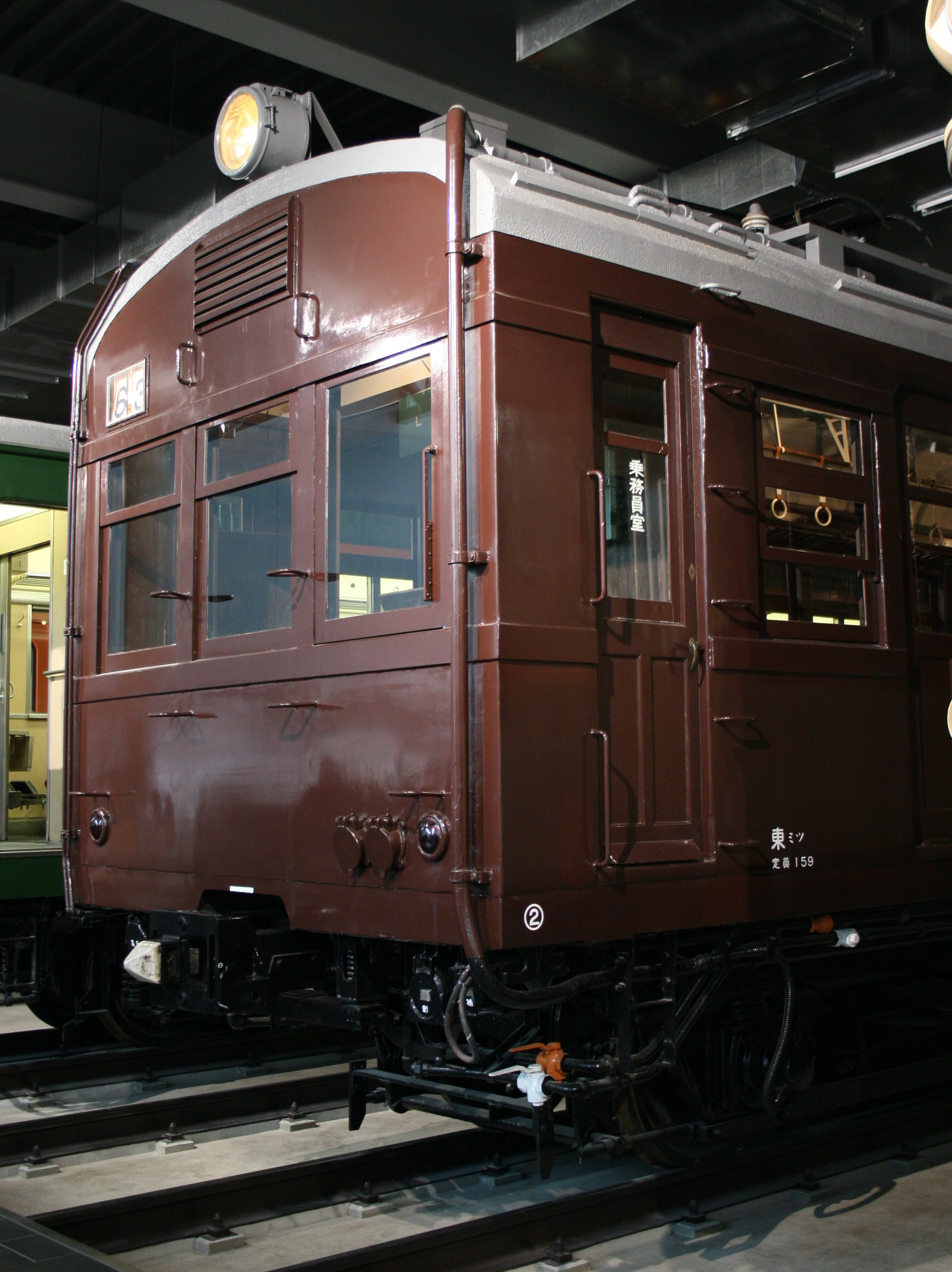
Preserved MoHa 63638 at SCMaglev and Railway Park, Nagoya

MoHa 63638 is preserved at the SCMaglev and Railway Park in Nagoya. It was built in 1947 by Kawasaki Sharyo, and was later renumbered KuMoYa 90005 as a non-revenue earning car, before being stored at JR Central's Hamamatsu Works.
