= KiHa 189 series =

Japanese train type

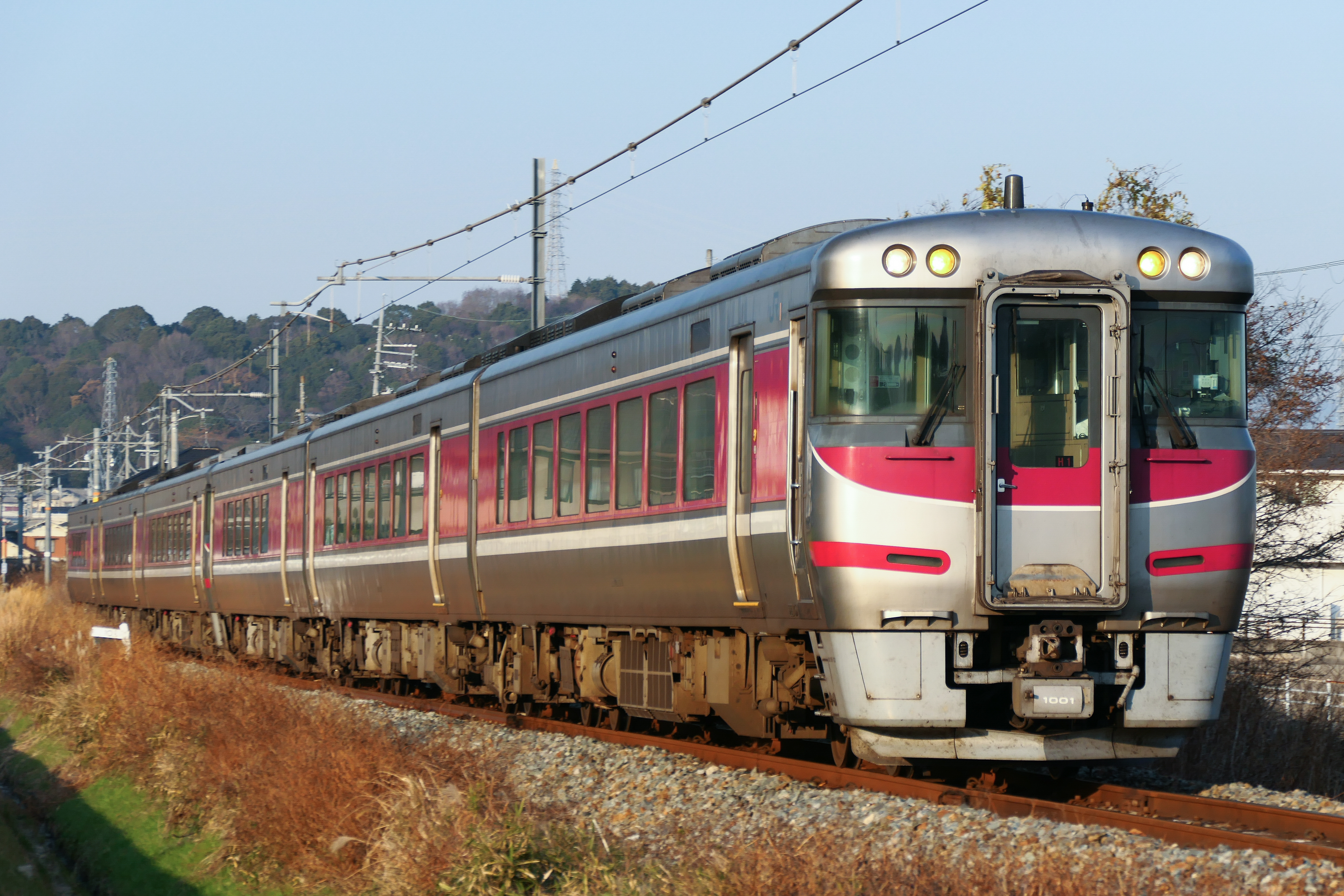
- KiHa 189 series on a Hamakaze service in December 2023
- Manufacturer: Niigata Transys
- Replaced: KiHa 181 series
- Constructed: 2010
- Entered service: 7 November 2010
- Number built: 21 vehicles
- Number in service: 21 vehicles (7 sets)
- Formation: 3 cars per trainset
- Fleet numbers: H1–H7
- Capacity: 156 (monoclass)
- Operator: JR-West
- Depot: Kyoto
- Lines served: Tōkaidō Main Line, Sanyō Main Line, Bantan Line, Sanin Main Line

Specifications
- Car body construction: Stainless steel
- Car length: 20,870 mm (68 ft 6 in) (end cars); 20,800 mm (68 ft 3 in) (intermediate cars)
- Width: 2,900 mm (9 ft 6 in)
- Height: 3,650 mm (12 ft 0 in)
- Doors: One per side
- Maximum speed: 130 km/h (81 mph)
- Prime mover: SA6D140HE-2 (×2 per car)
- Power output: 450 hp (340 kW) per engine (at 2,100 rpm)
- Transmission: Hydraulic
- Acceleration: 2.0 km/(h⋅s) (1.2 mph/s)
- Deceleration: Service: 4.6 km/(h⋅s) (2.9 mph/s); Emergency: 5.2 km/(h⋅s) (3.2 mph/s)
- Bogies: WDT66
- Braking systems: Engine brake, electronically controlled pneumatic brakes
- Safety systems: ATS-SW, ATS-P
- Track gauge: 1,067 mm (3 ft 6 in)

The KiHa 189 series (キハ189系, Kiha-189-kei) is a diesel multiple unit (DMU) train type operated by West Japan Railway Company (JR-West) on Hamakaze limited express services between Osaka and Tottori since November 2010 and Biwako Express services between Osaka and Maibara since March 2014.

The "KiHa" designation derives from the classification system used by JNR. "Ki" indicates a diesel-powered vehicle, while "Ha" indicates an ordinary passenger car, as opposed to a green car.

== Operations ==
- Hamakaze (from November 2010)
- Biwako Express (from March 2014)

== Formation ==
Trains are formed as 3-car sets, as shown below.

Car No.	1	2	3
Designation	Mc2	M1	Mc1
Numbering	KiHa 189-1000	KiHa 188	KiHa 189
Seating capacity	60	56	40
Weight (t)	48.0	47.5	49.5

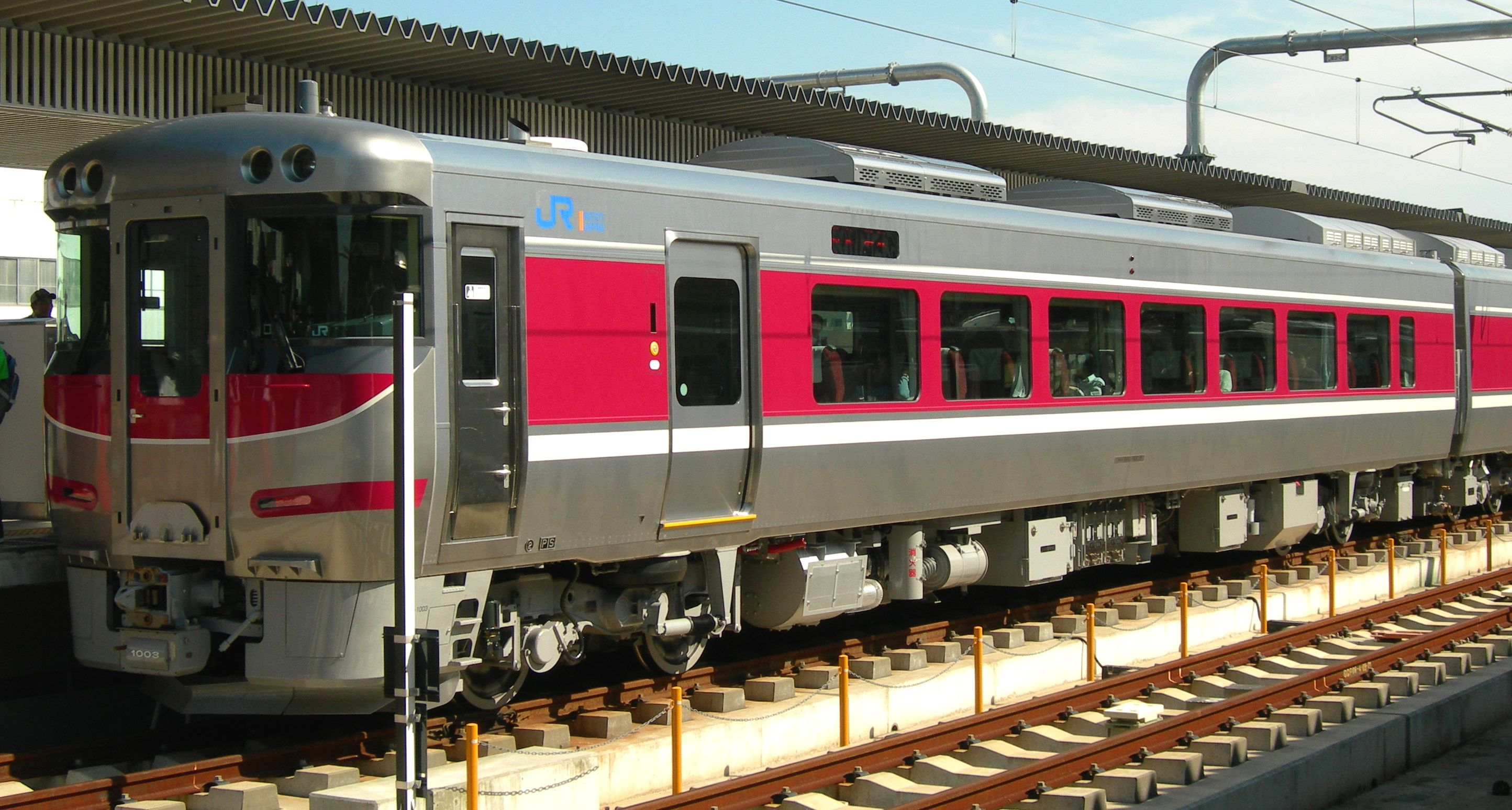
KiHa 189-1000

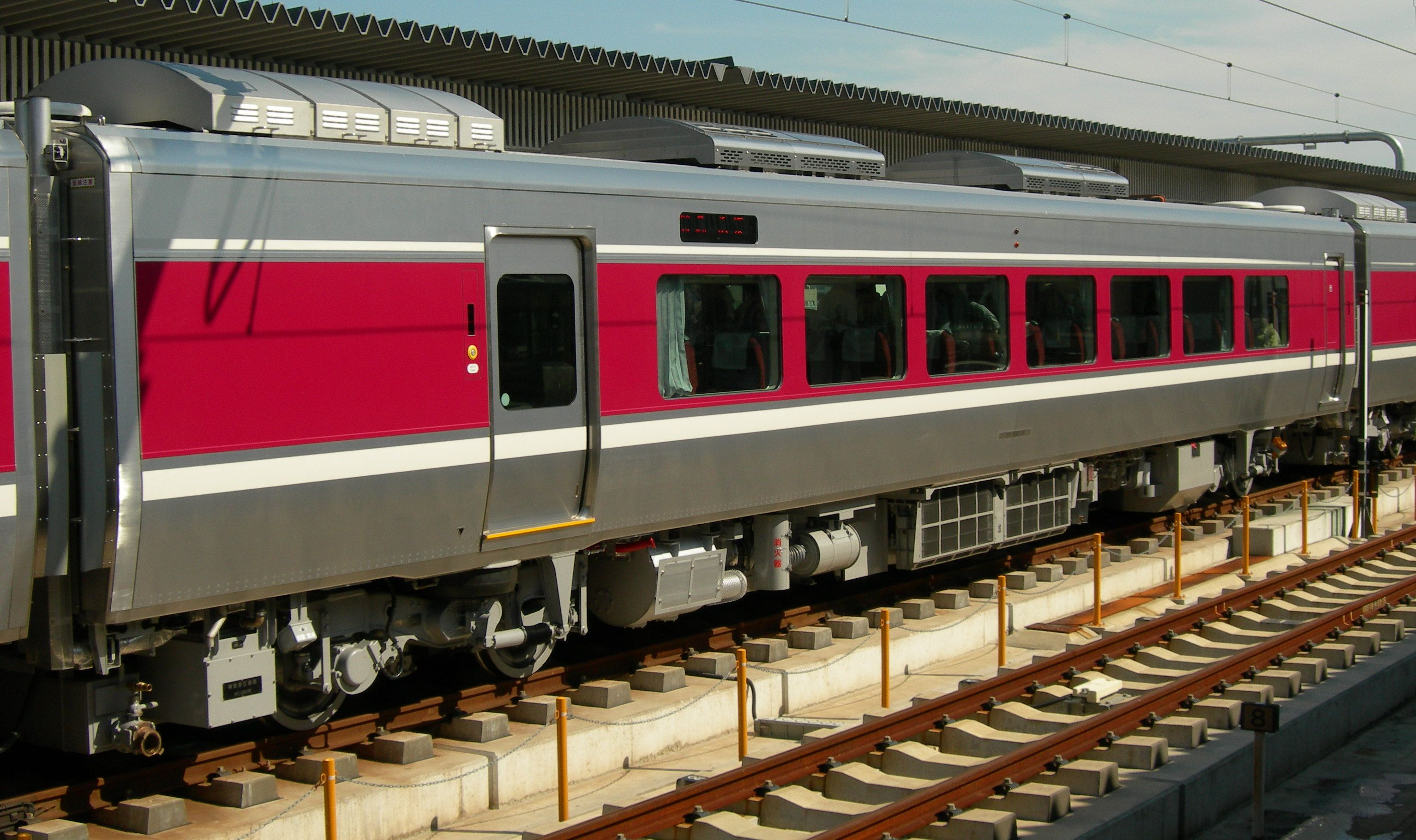
KiHa 188

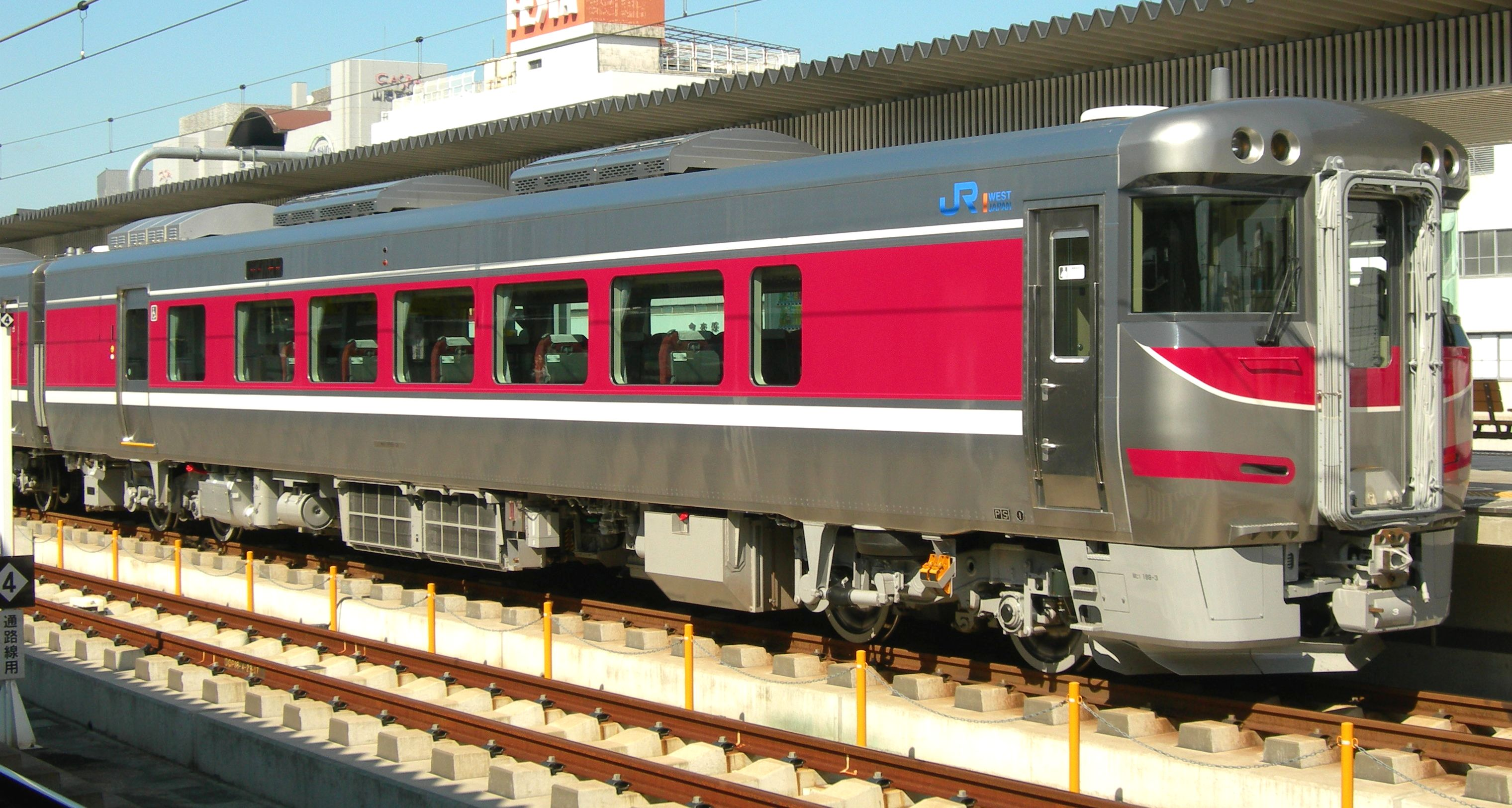
KiHa 189

== Interior ==
The trains are all standard-class, with a total seating capacity of 156 passengers per 3-car set. Seating is in standard 2+2 abreast configuration with a seat pitch of 970 mm, an increase of 60 mm compared with the earlier KiHa 181 series trains.

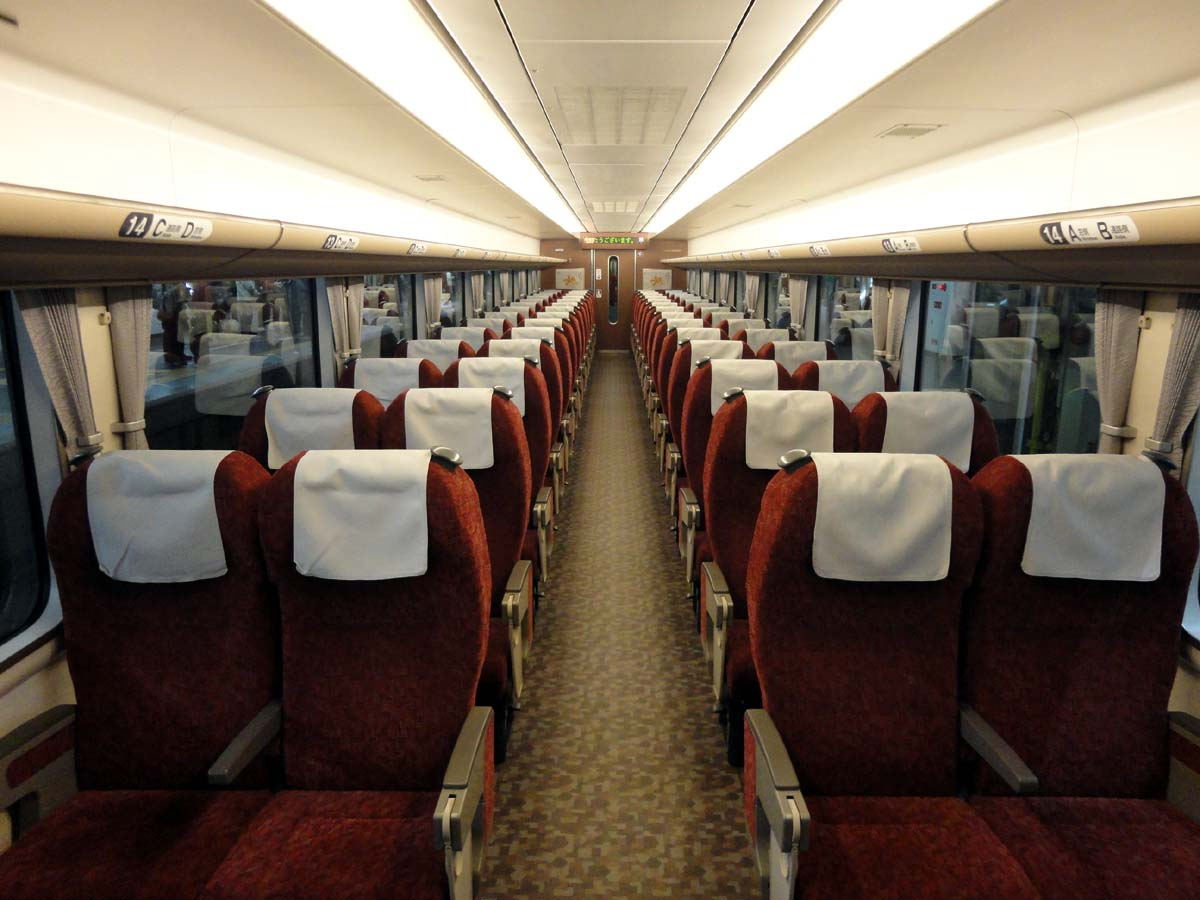
Interior view, December 2011

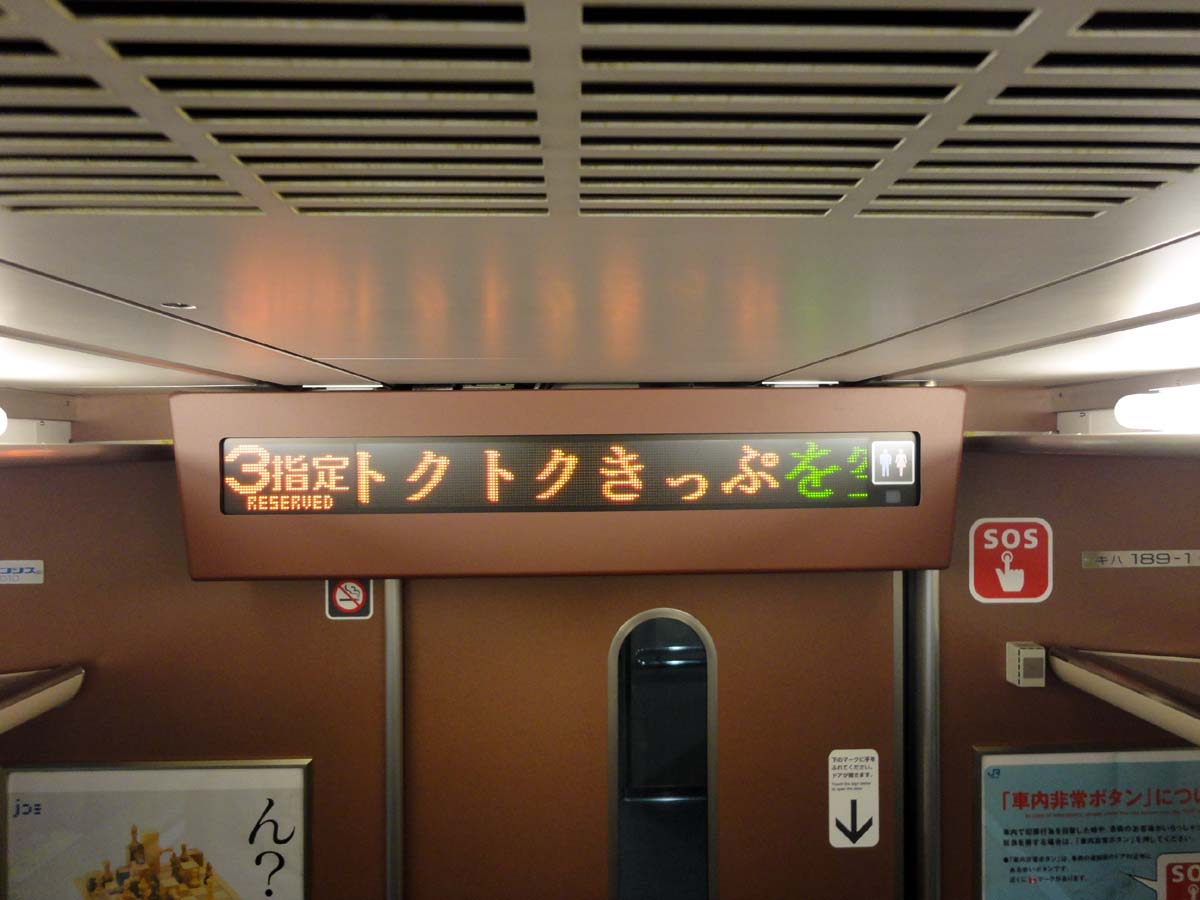
LED passenger information display

== History ==
The first three-car set was delivered from Niigata Transys to Fukui Depot on 19 March 2010, with test running commencing on 23 March.

The trains entered revenue service from 7 November 2010.

=== Hana Akari ===
In October 2022, JR-West announced plans to remodel a KiHa 189 series set into a sightseeing train. The renovated train, designed by Yasuyuki Kawanishi, is scheduled to commence operation in late 2024. In June 2024, set H5 was converted to become the KiHa 189-7000 series sightseeing train branded "Hana Akari" (はなあかり).

The Hana Akari trainset entered revenue service on 5 October 2024.
