= Sakuma Rail Park =

Railway museum in Shizuoka, Japan (1991-2009)

- 佐久間レールパーク
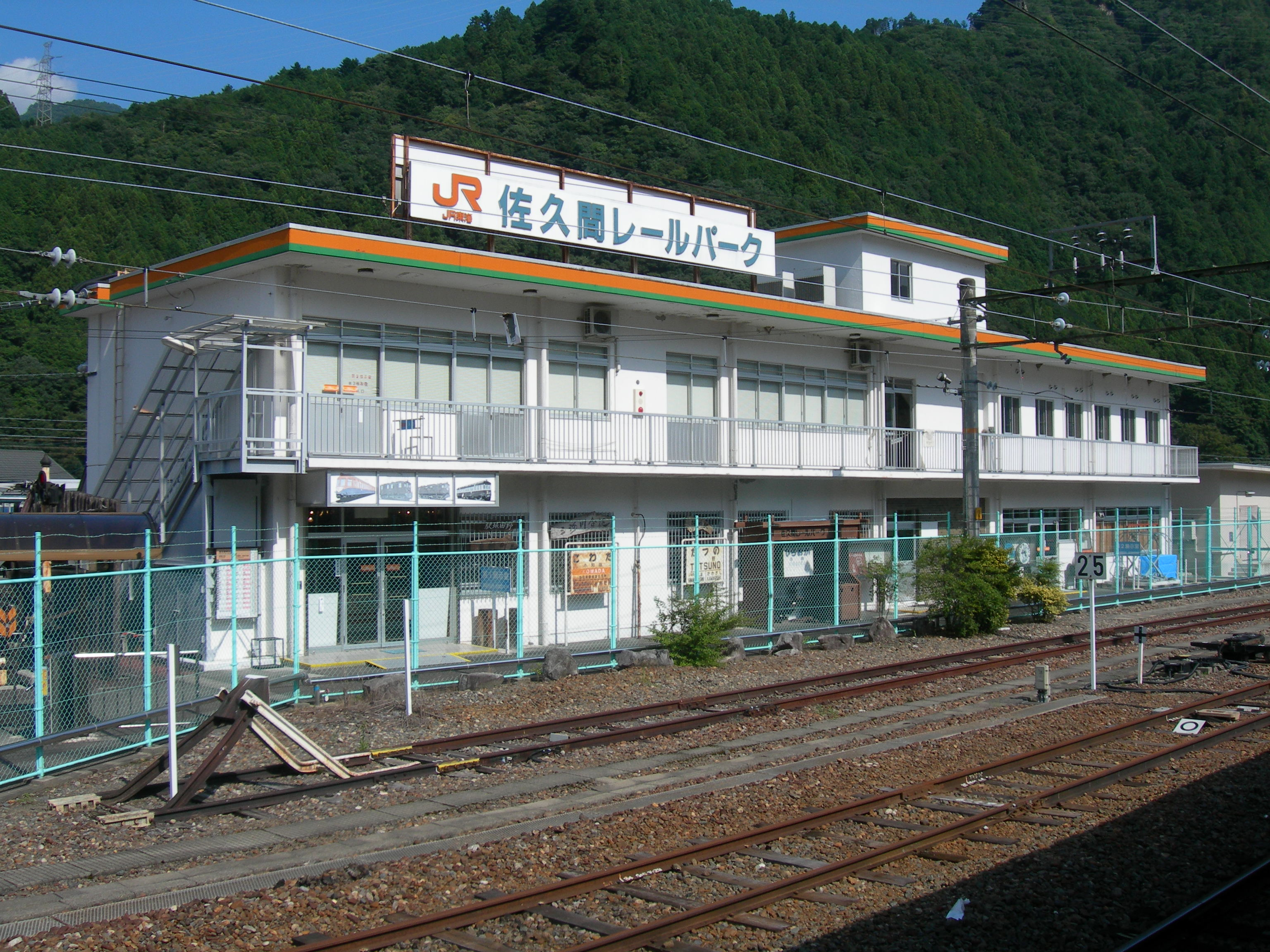
- View from the station platform in August 2008

- Location within Japan
- Established: 21 April 1991
- Dissolved: 1 November 2009
- Location: Hamamatsu, Shizuoka, Japan
- Coordinates: 35.085511°N 137.802622°E
- Type: Railway museum
- Public transit access: Chūbu-Tenryū Station

The Sakuma Rail Park (佐久間レールパーク, Sakuma Rēru Pāku) was an open-air railway museum located next to Chūbu-Tenryū Station on the Iida Line in Hamamatsu, Shizuoka, Japan. It was operated by Central Japan Railway Company (JR Central), and was opened on 21 April 1991. The museum closed on 1 November 2009 in preparation for the move to a new SCMaglev and Railway Park in Nagoya in 2011.

== Exhibits ==
As of June 2009, the following railway vehicles were on display.

=== Shinkansen ===
- 0 Series Shinkansen car – No. 21-2023 (cab end only, later moved to J-TREC factory in Yokohama)

=== Locomotives ===
- JNR Class ED11 electric locomotive - No. ED11 2 (built 1922 by General Electric, later moved to SCMaglev and Railway Park)
- JNR Class ED62 electric locomotive - No. ED62 14
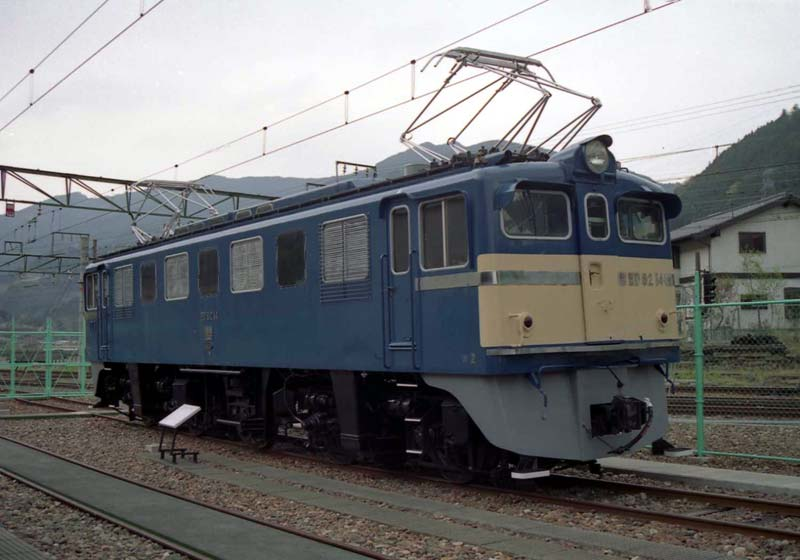
ED62 14

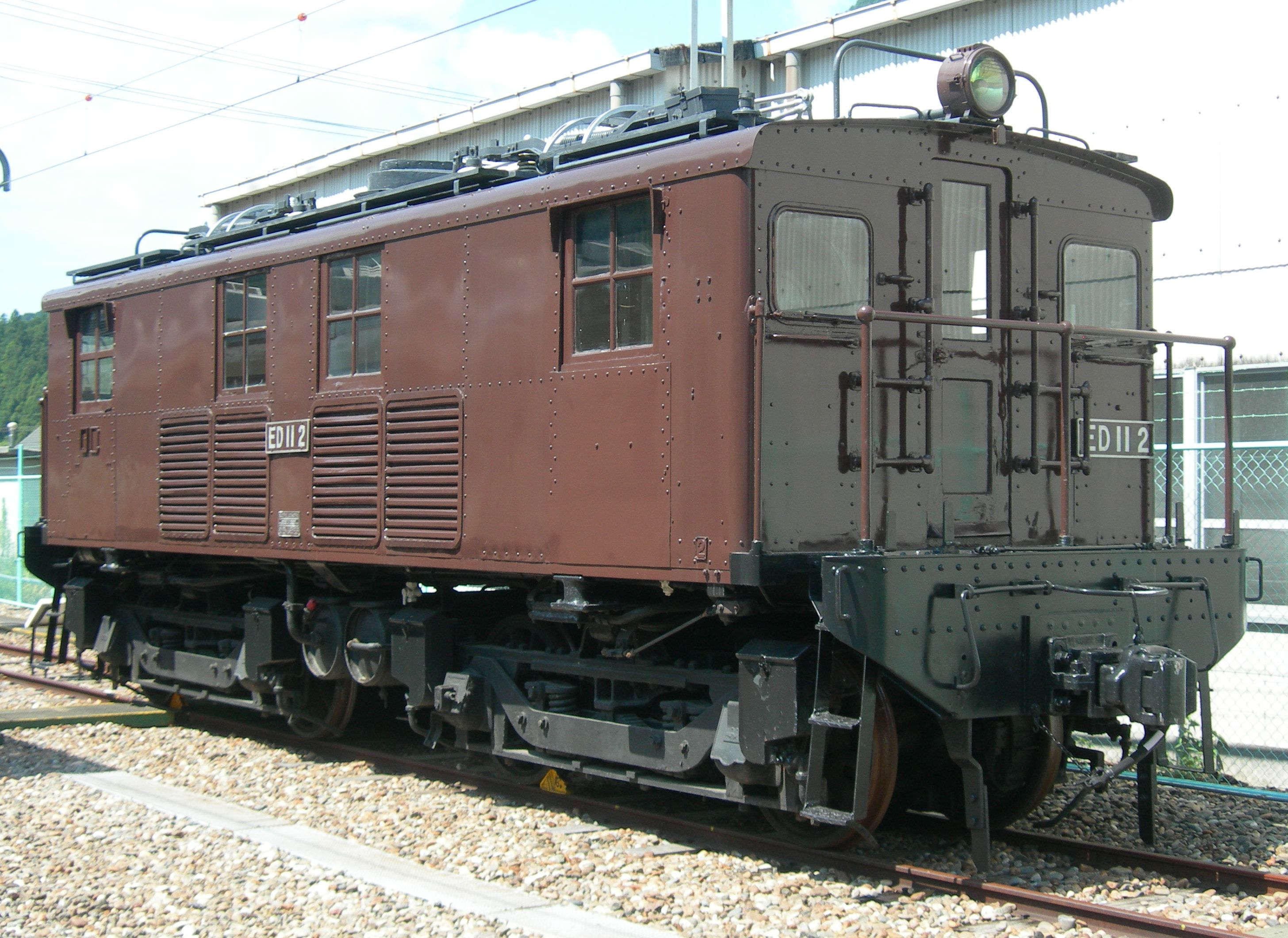
ED11 2, August 2008

=== Electric railcars ===
- Class KuMoHa 12 EMU car - No. MoHa 12054 (rebuilt 1959)
- Class KuMoHa 52 EMU car - No. MoHa 52004 (built 1937 by Kawasaki Sharyo, later moved to SCMaglev and Railway Park)
- 111 series EMU car - No. KuHa 111-1 (built 1962 by Nippon Sharyo, later moved to SCMaglev and Railway Park)
- KuYa 165 EMU car - No. KuYa 165-1 (rebuilt 1974 from former SaHaShi 153–15)
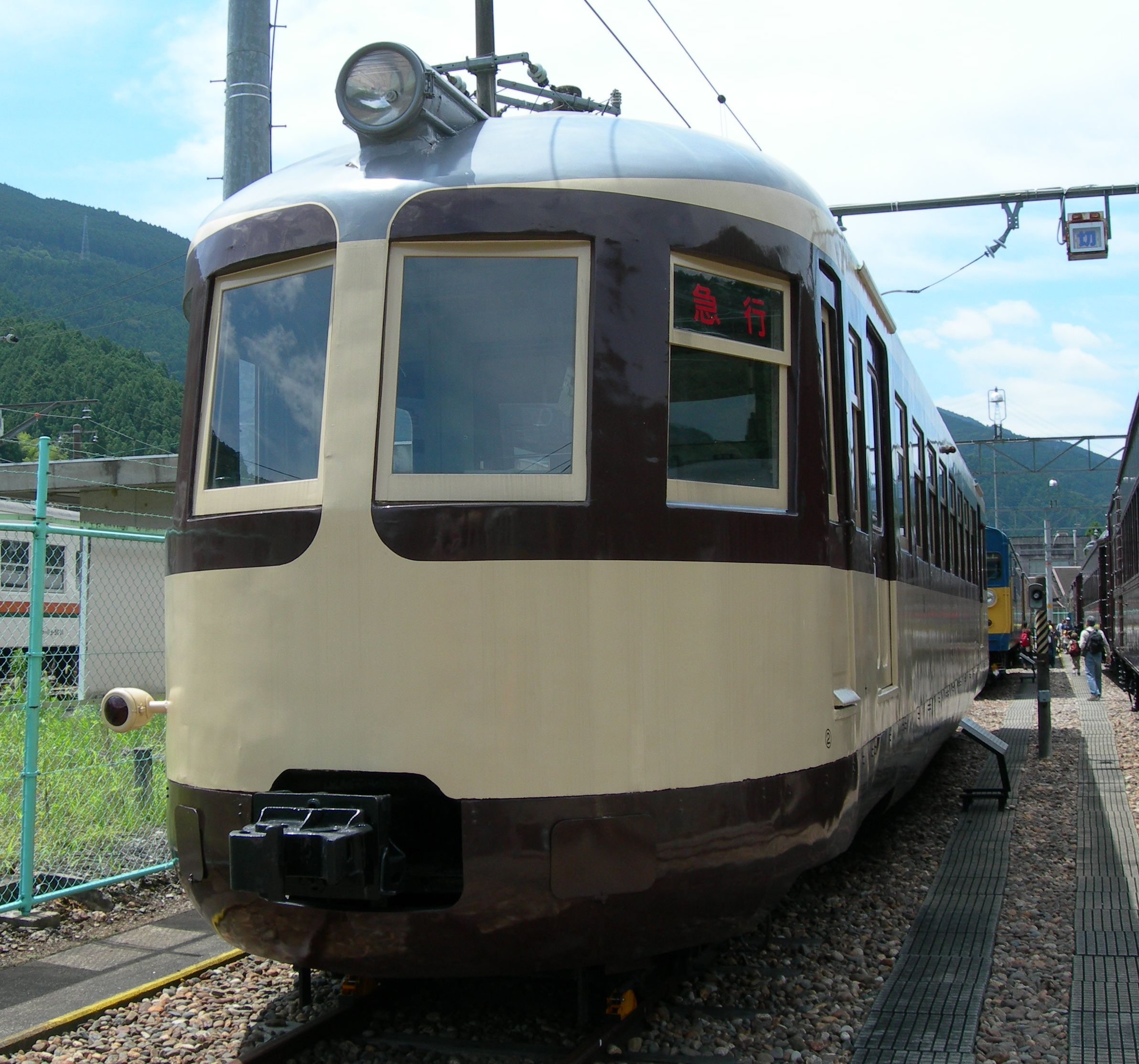
MoHa 52004, August 2008

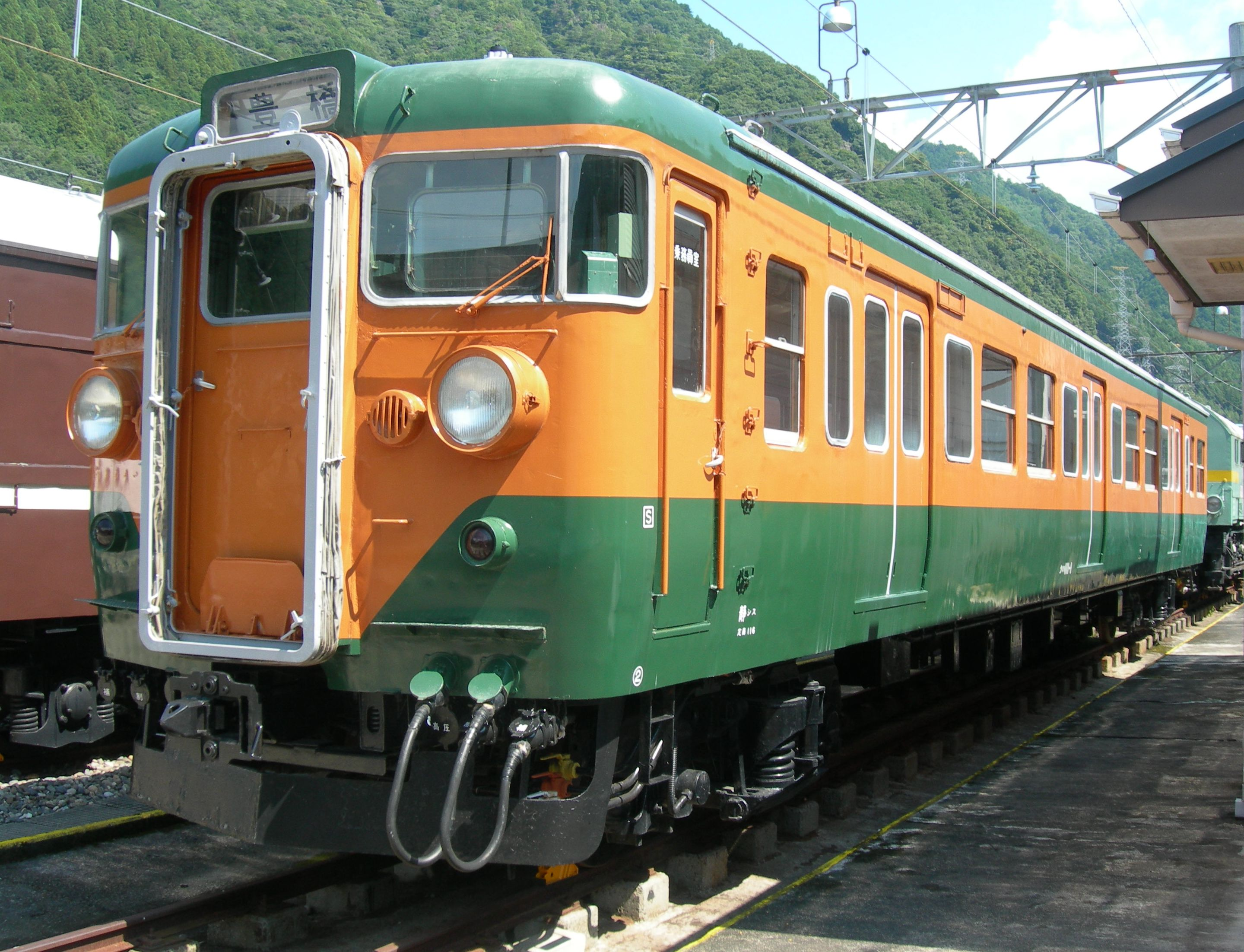
KuHa 111–1, August 2008

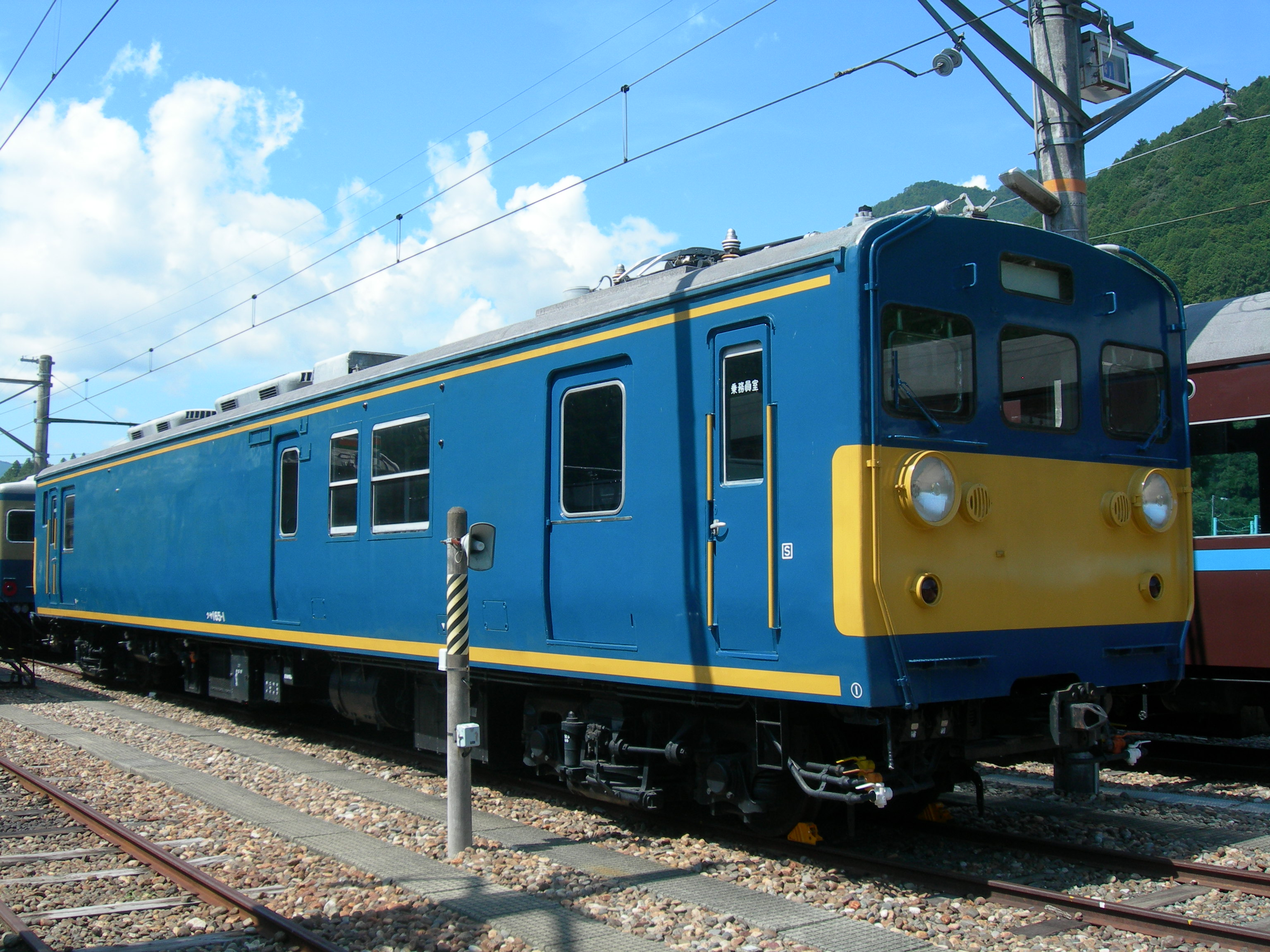
KuYa 165–1, August 2008

=== Diesel railcars ===
- Class KiHa 48000 railcar - No. KiHa 48036 (built 1956 by Tokyu Car, later moved to SCMaglev and Railway Park)
- Class KiHa 181 DMU car - No. KiHa 181-1 (built 1968 by Fuji Heavy Industries, later moved to SCMaglev and Railway Park)
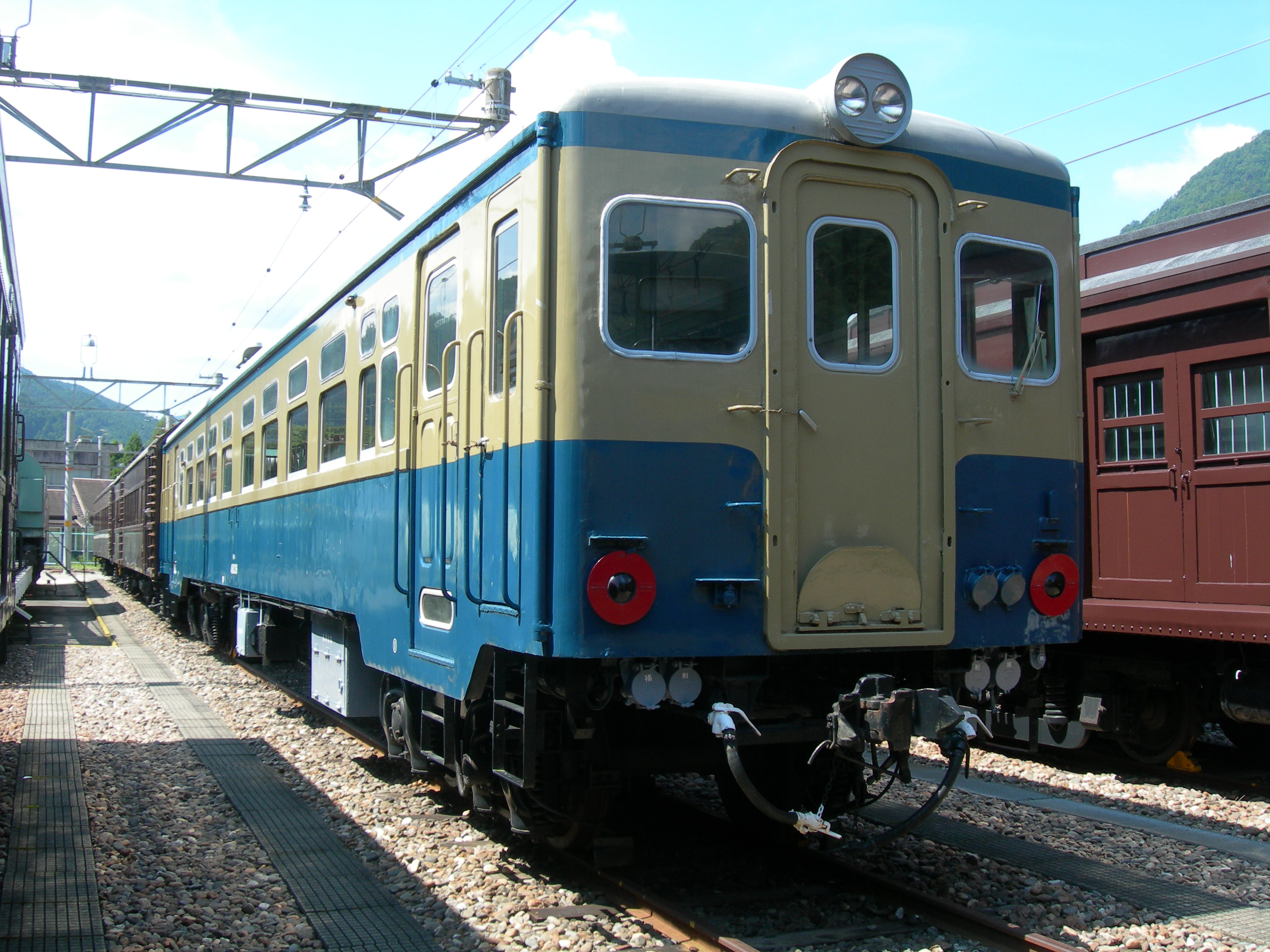
KiHa 48036, August 2008

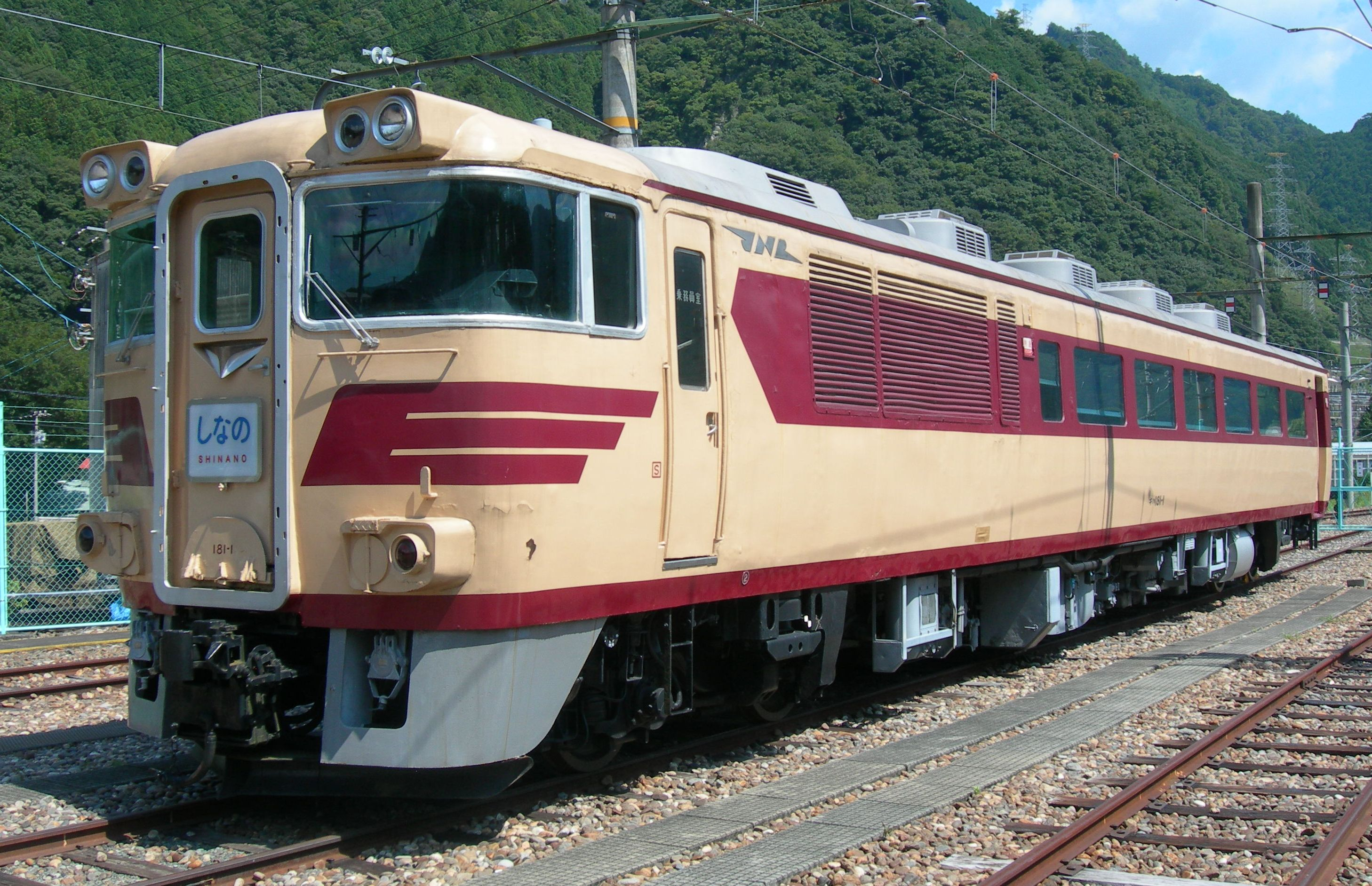
KiHa 181–1, August 2008

=== Passenger carriages ===
- SuNi 30 passenger carriage – No. SuNi 30 95 (built 1929 by Osaka Tekko, later moved to SCMaglev and Railway Park)
- OYa 31 passenger carriage – No. OYa 31 12 (built 1937 by Nakata Sharyo, later moved to SCMaglev and Railway Park)
- OHaFu 33 passenger carriage – No. OHaFu 33 115
- OHa 35 passenger carriage – No. OHa 35 206 (built 1941 by Nippon Sharyo, later moved to SCMaglev and Railway Park)
- MaINe 40 sleeping carriage – No. MaINe 40 7 (built 1948 by Nippon Sharyo, later moved to SCMaglev and Railway Park)
- 10 series sleeping carriage – No. ORoNe 10 27 (built 1960 by Hitachi, later moved to SCMaglev and Railway Park)
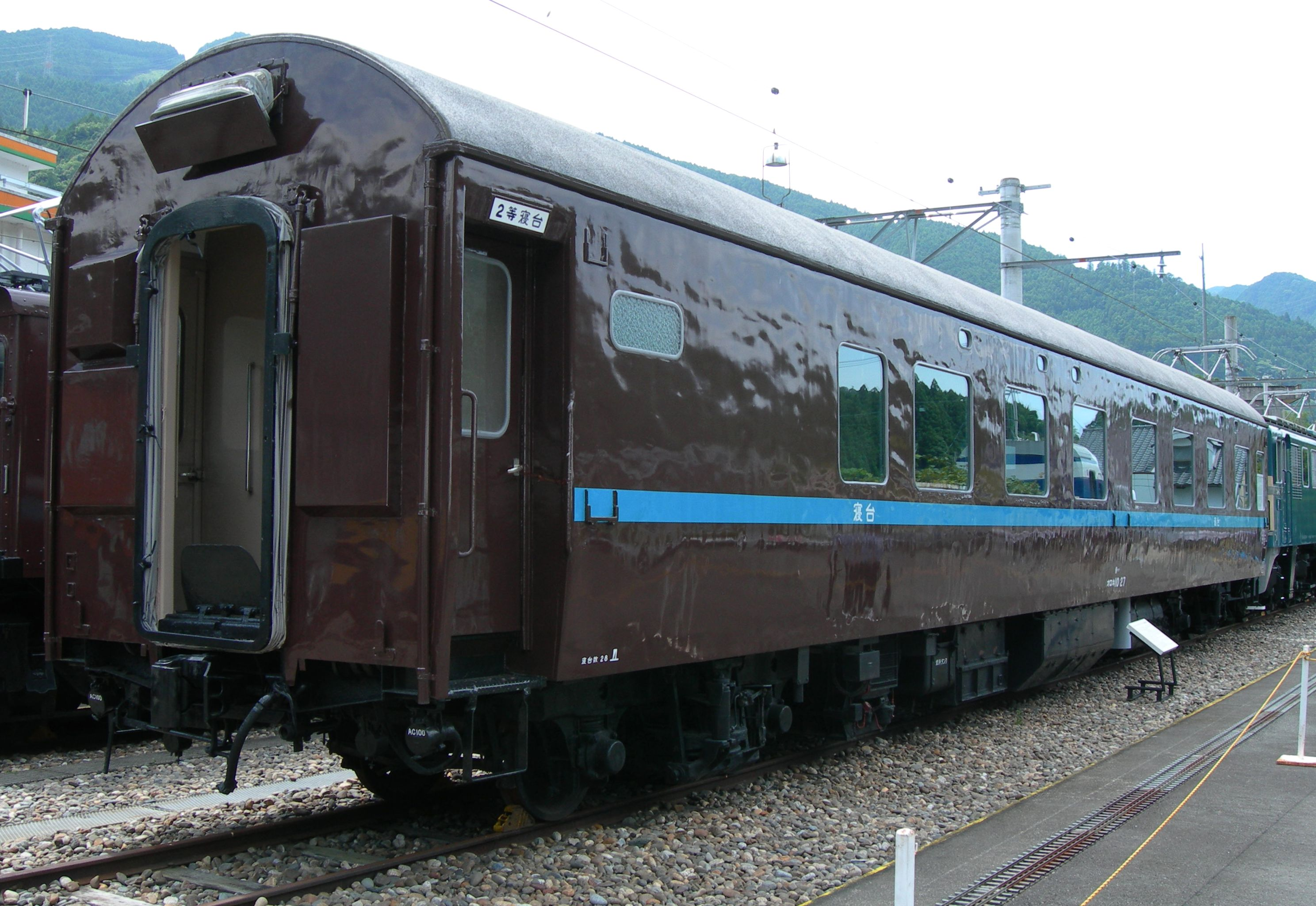
ORoNe 10 27, August 2008

=== Other vehicles ===
- So 80 crane - No. So 180 & ChiKi 6132 match wagon
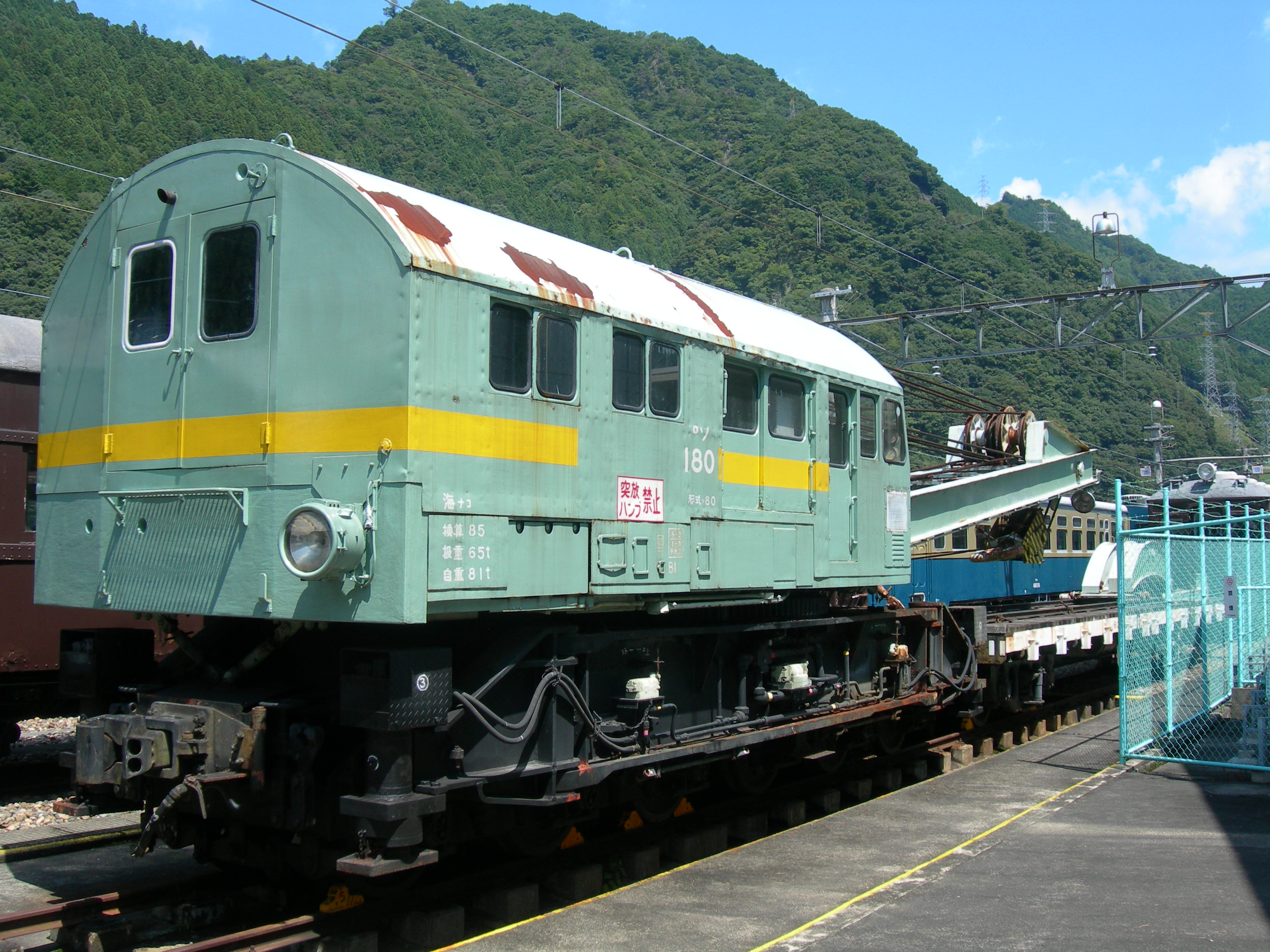
Crane So 180, August 2008

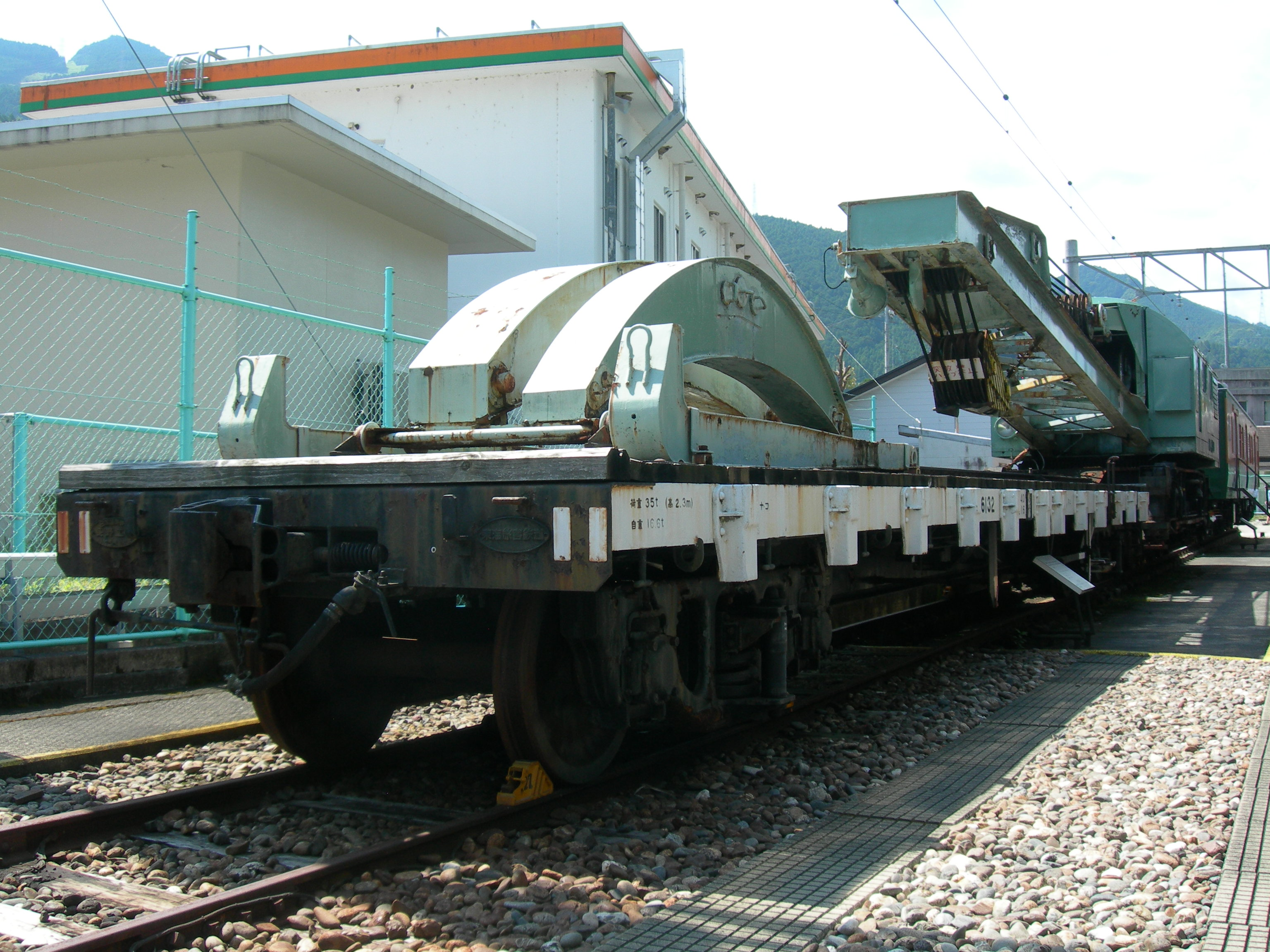
Match wagon ChiKi 6132, August 2008
