= Kokudō Station =

Railway station in Yokohama, Japan

Coordinates: 35.5006°N 139.6756°E

JI02 Kokudō Station 国道駅
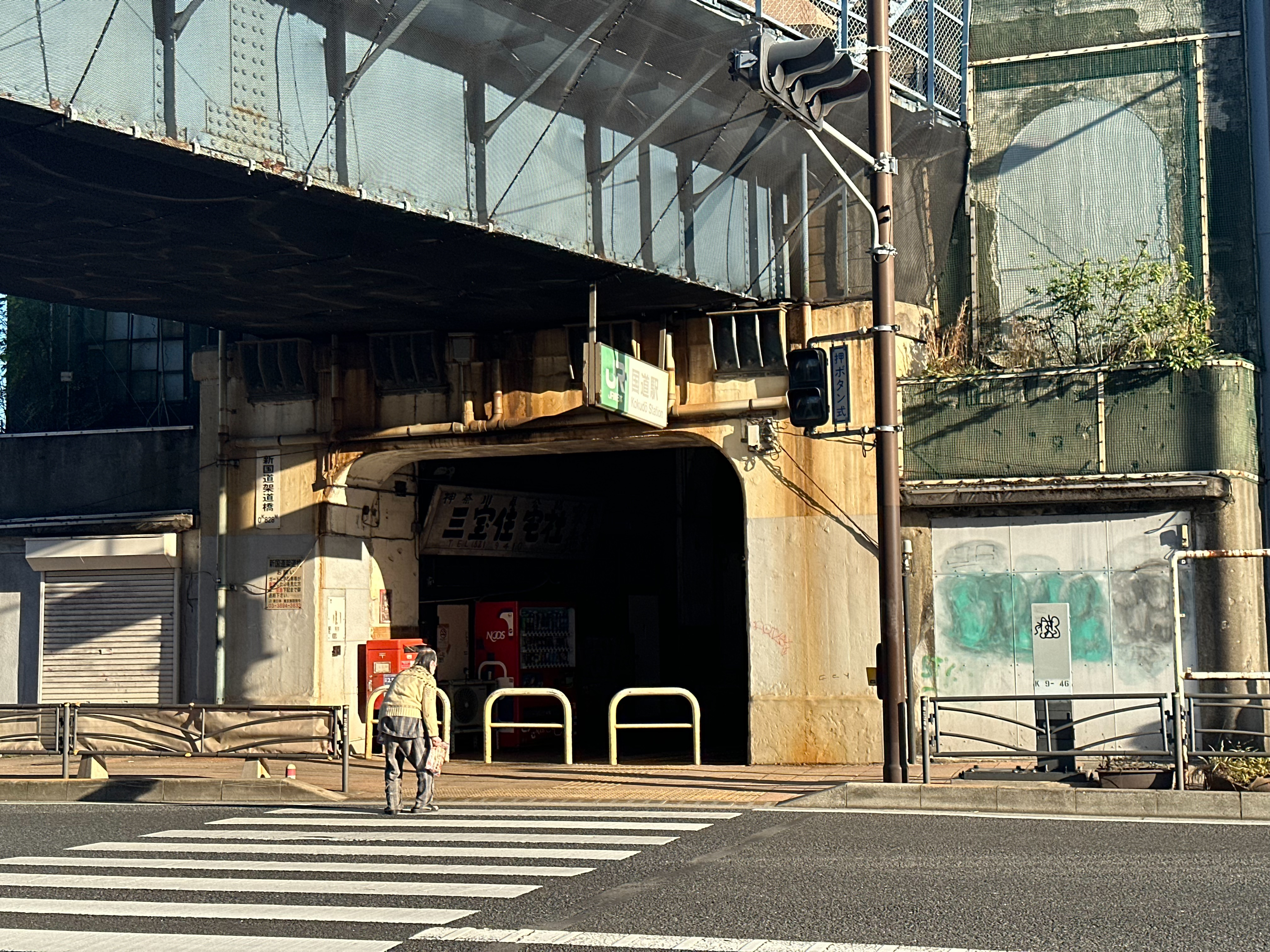
- Entrance to the station, November 2023

General information
- Location: Namamugi 5-chōme, Tsurumi, Yokohama, Kanagawa （横浜市鶴見区生麦5丁目） Japan
- Operator: JR East
- Line: Tsurumi Line
- Connections: Bus stop

History
- Opened: 28 October 1930; 95 years ago

Passengers
- 2007: 1,532 daily

Services
| Preceding station | JR East | Following station |
|---|---|---|
| Tsurumi JI01 Terminus | Tsurumi Line | Tsurumi-Ono JI03 towards Ōgimachi, Umi-Shibaura or Ōkawa |
Location
- Location within Kanagawa Prefecture Location within Japan

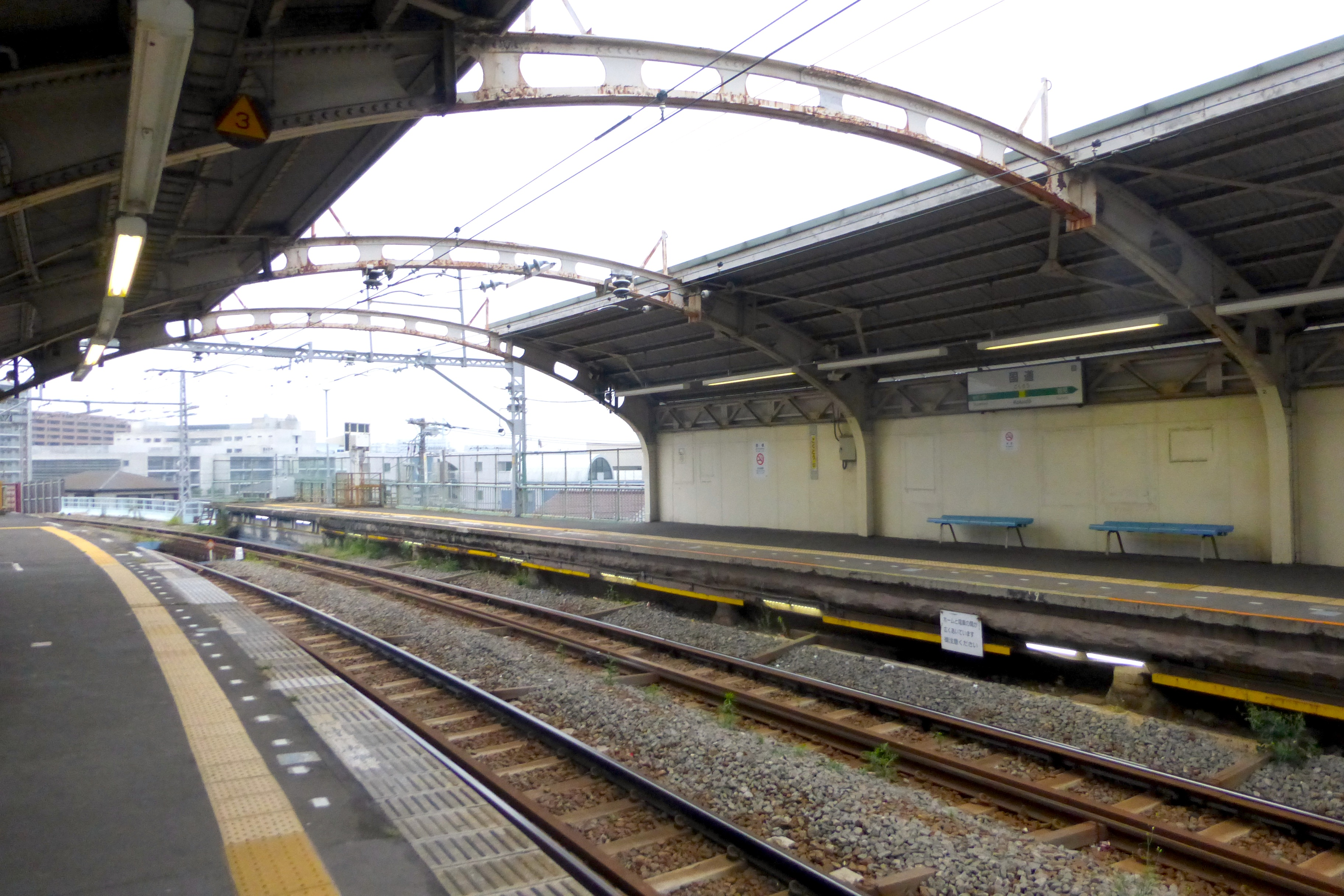
Station platforms, June 2015

Kokudō Station (国道駅, Kokudō-eki) is a railway station operated by East Japan Railway Company (JR East) in Tsurumi-ku, Yokohama, Kanagawa Prefecture, Japan.

== Lines ==
Kokudō Station is served by the Tsurumi Line, and is 0.9 kilometers (0.56 mi) from the terminus at Tsurumi Station.

== Station layout ==
Kokudō Station has two opposed side platforms serving two tracks.

=== Platforms ===
| 1 | Tsurumi Line | for Bentembashi, Hama-Kawasaki, Ōgimachi, Umi-Shibaura, and Ōkawa |
| 2 | Tsurumi Line | for Tsurumi |

== History ==
Kokudō Station was opened on 28 October 1930 as a station on the privately held Tsurumi Rinkō Railway (鶴見臨港鉄道, Tsurumi Rinkō Tetsudō) for passenger operations only. The Tsurumi Rinkō line was nationalized on 1 July 1943, at which time the stop was elevated into status to that of a full station. The station was later absorbed into the Japan National Railways (JNR) network. In 1949, the station was used as a location setting for the Akira Kurosawa movie Stray Dog. The station has been unstaffed since 1 March 1971. Upon the privatization of the JNR on 1 April 1987 the station has been operated by JR East.
