= Tsurumi-Ono Station =

Railway station in Yokohama, Japan

Coordinates: 35.4976°N 139.6814°E

JI03 Tsurumi-Ono Station 鶴見小野駅
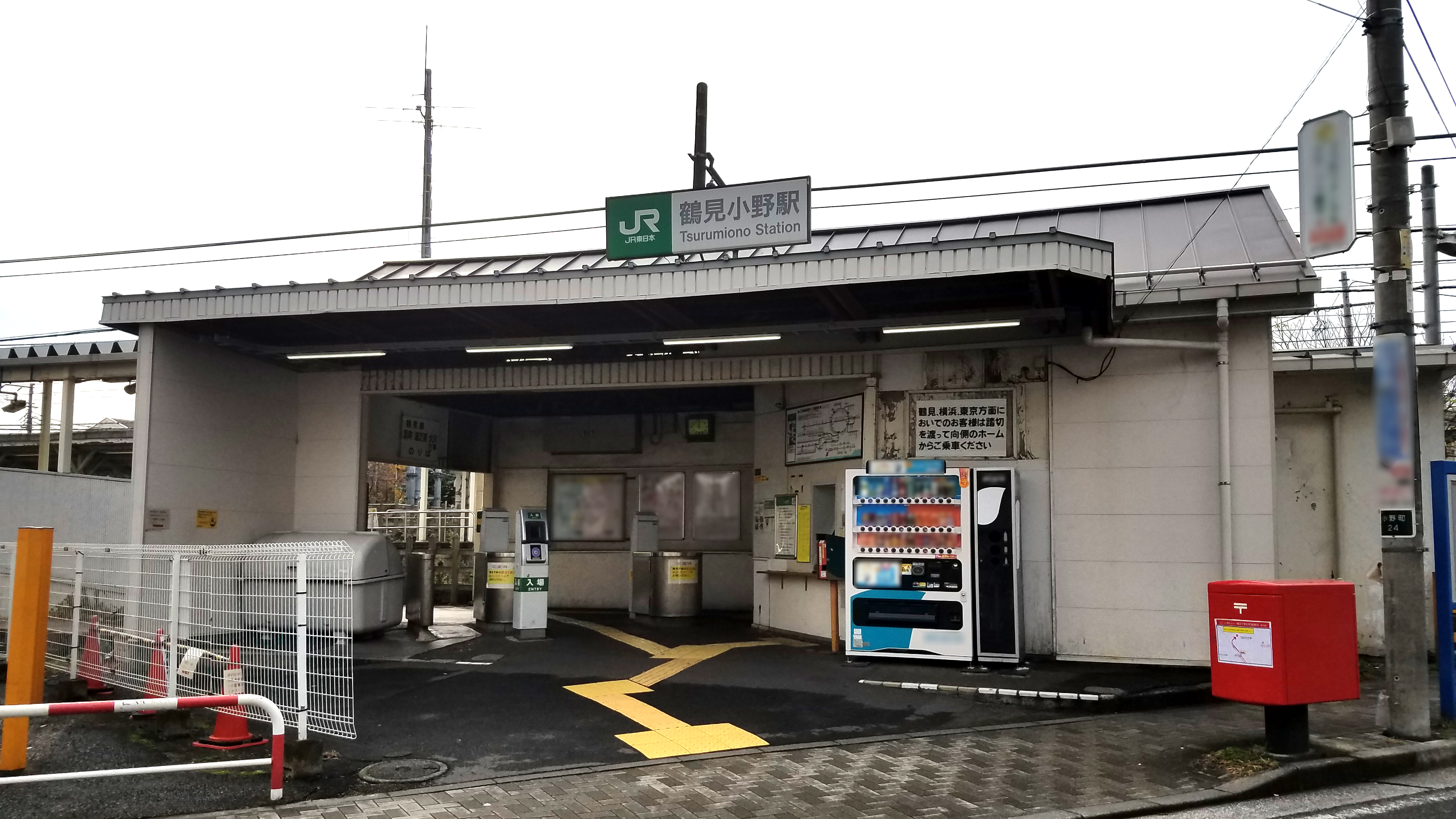
- The east-side entrance in December 2019

General information
- Location: 24 Ono-chō, Tsurumi, Yokohama, Kanagawa （横浜市鶴見区小野町24） Japan
- Operator: JR East
- Line: Tsurumi Line
- Connections: Bus stop

History
- Opened: 8 December 1936; 89 years ago
- Former names: Kōgyōgakkō-mae (until 1943)

Passengers
- 2007: 4,949 daily

Services
Preceding station	JR East	Following station
Kokudō JI02 towards Tsurumi	Tsurumi Line	Bentembashi JI04 towards Ōgimachi, Umi-Shibaura or Ōkawa
Location
- Location within Kanagawa Prefecture Location within Japan

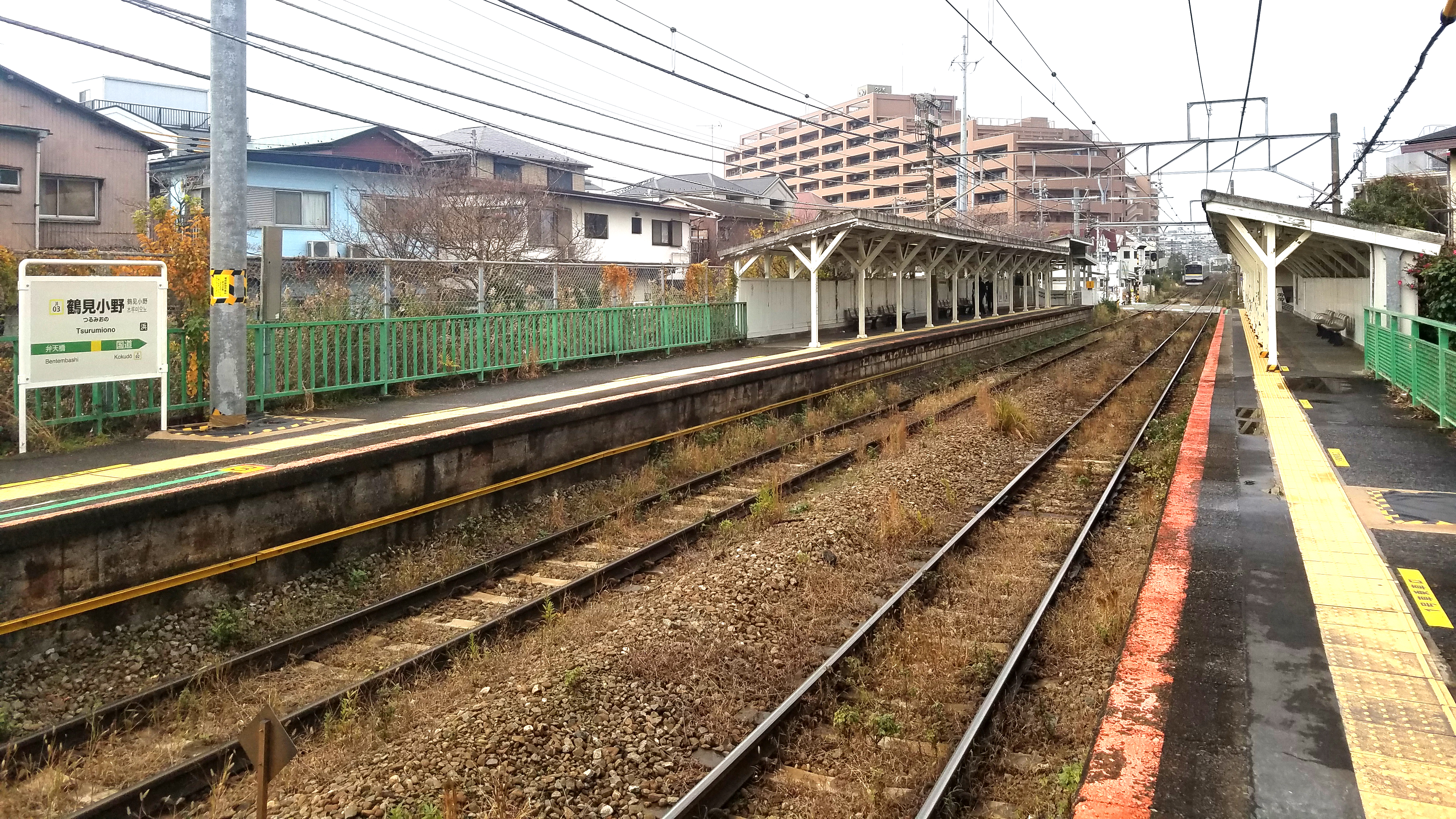
Station platforms in December 2019

Tsurumi-Ono Station (鶴見小野駅, Tsurumi-Ono-eki) is a railway station operated by East Japan Railway Company (JR East) in Tsurumi-ku, Yokohama, Kanagawa Prefecture, Japan.

== Lines ==
Tsurumi-Ono Station is served by the Tsurumi Line, and is located 1.5 kilometers (0.93 mi) from the terminus at Tsurumi Station.

== Station layout ==
Tsurumi-Ono Station has two opposed side platforms serving two tracks, connected by a level crossing.

=== Platforms ===
1	Tsurumi Line	for Bentembashi, Hama-Kawasaki, Ōgimachi, Umi-Shibaura, and Ōkawa
2	Tsurumi Line	for Kokudō and Tsurumi

== History ==
Tsurumi-Ono Station was opened on 8 December 1936 as Kōgyōgakkō-mae Stop (工業学校前停留場) on the privately held Tsurumi Rinkō Railway (鶴見臨港鉄道, Tsurumi Rinkō Tetsudō) and for passenger operations only. The Tsurumi Rinkō line was nationalized on 1 July 1943 at which time the stop was elevated into status to that of a full station and given its present name. The station was later absorbed into the Japan National Railways (JNR) network. The station has been unstaffed since 1 March 1971. Upon the privatization of the JNR on 1 April 1987 the station has been operated by JR East.
