= KuMoHa 12 =

Japanese train type

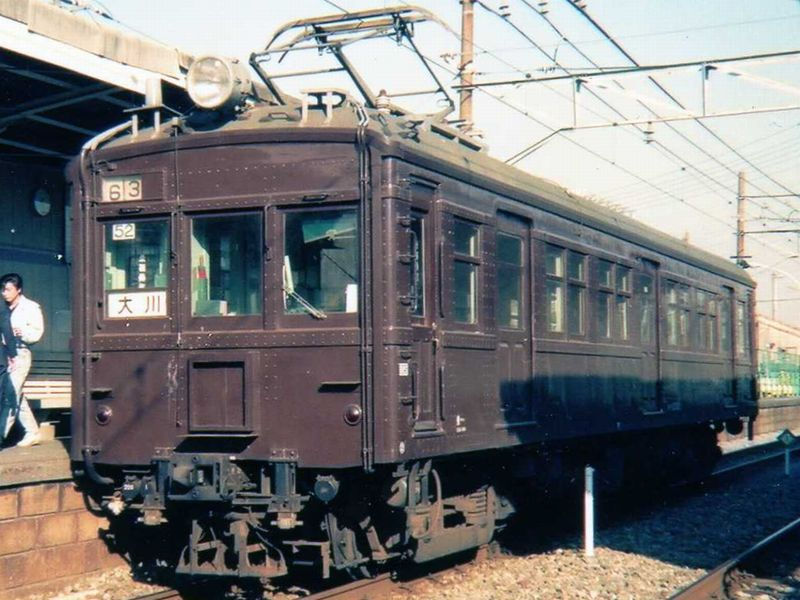
- KuMoHa 12052 on an Ōkawa Branch Line service, circa December 1990
- In service: 1933–2002
- Refurbished: 1933,1950,1958,1960, 1987
- Number built: 27 vehicles (all converted from other train types)
- Number in service: none
- Number preserved: 1 vehicle
- Operators: JGR (1933–1949); JNR (1949–1987); JR East (1987–1996); JR Central (1987–2002)
- Line served: Various

Specifications
- Car body construction: Steel
- Car length: 17,000 mm (55 ft 9 in)
- Doors: 3 per side
- Traction system: Resistor control
- Traction motors: MT15
- Transmission: Camshaft
- Current collection: overhead catenary
- Track gauge: 1,067 mm (3 ft 6 in)

The KuMoHa 12 (クモハ12形) was a class of electric multiple unit (EMU) railroad cars formerly used by the Japanese National Railways (JNR). These are EMU power cars of 17-meter (56 ft) length with a driver's cab at each end, three passenger doors on each side, and lengthwise bench-type passenger seating. The cars themselves were built in the later 1920s and 1930s for JNR's predecessor, the Japanese Government Railways (JGR), but the class, originally named MoHa 12 (モハ12形), was established on 1 June 1953 by a JNR revision of its rolling stock classification regulations. In June 1959, a new JNR classification revision assigned the code KuMo (クモ) to all cab-equipped power cars, giving the KuMoHa 12 class its present name.

When the MoHa 12 class was formed in 1953, it consisted of 13 cars of the old JGR dual-cab MoHa 34 class. Over time, additional cars were added by remodeling related old JGR classes, for an eventual total of 33 cars.

== List of cars ==
The various KuMoHa 12 cars have the following origins:

- 12000–12003 - Built in 1933 as dual-cab MoHa 34 cars.
- 12010–12018 - Built in 1929-1930 as single-cab MoHa 31 cars, then remodeled in 1950–1951 with dual cabs as MoHa 34 cars.
- 12019–12027 - Built in 1929-1931 as single-cab MoHa 31 cars and reclassified in 1953 as MoHa 11 series 200. Remodeled in 1958 as dual-cab MoHa 12 cars.
- 12030–12032 - Built in 1939-1941 as single-cab MoHa 50 cars and reclassified in 1953 as MoHa 11 series 400. Remodeled in 1958 as dual-cab MoHa 12 cars.
- 12040 - Built in 1926 as a single-cab MoHa 30 car and reclassified in 1953 as a MoHa 11 series 100. Remodeled in 1960 as a dual-cab KuMoHa 12 car.
- 12041 - Built in 1927 as a single-cab MoHa 30, remodeled in 1953 as a cabless MoHa 10, and remodeled again in 1964 as KuMoYa 22 tractor car 22112. Converted in 1987 to a KuMoHa 12 for special-event passenger service by JR Central on the Iida Line. This car has been exhibited at the SCMaglev and Railway Park since March 2011.
- 12050–12055 - Built in 1929-1931 as single-cab MoHa 31 cars and reclassified in 1953 as MoHa 11 series 200. Remodeled in 1959 as dual-cab KuMoHa 12 cars. Later operated by JR East on the Tsurumi Line (Ōkawa Branch Line). The last car was withdrawn in 1996.
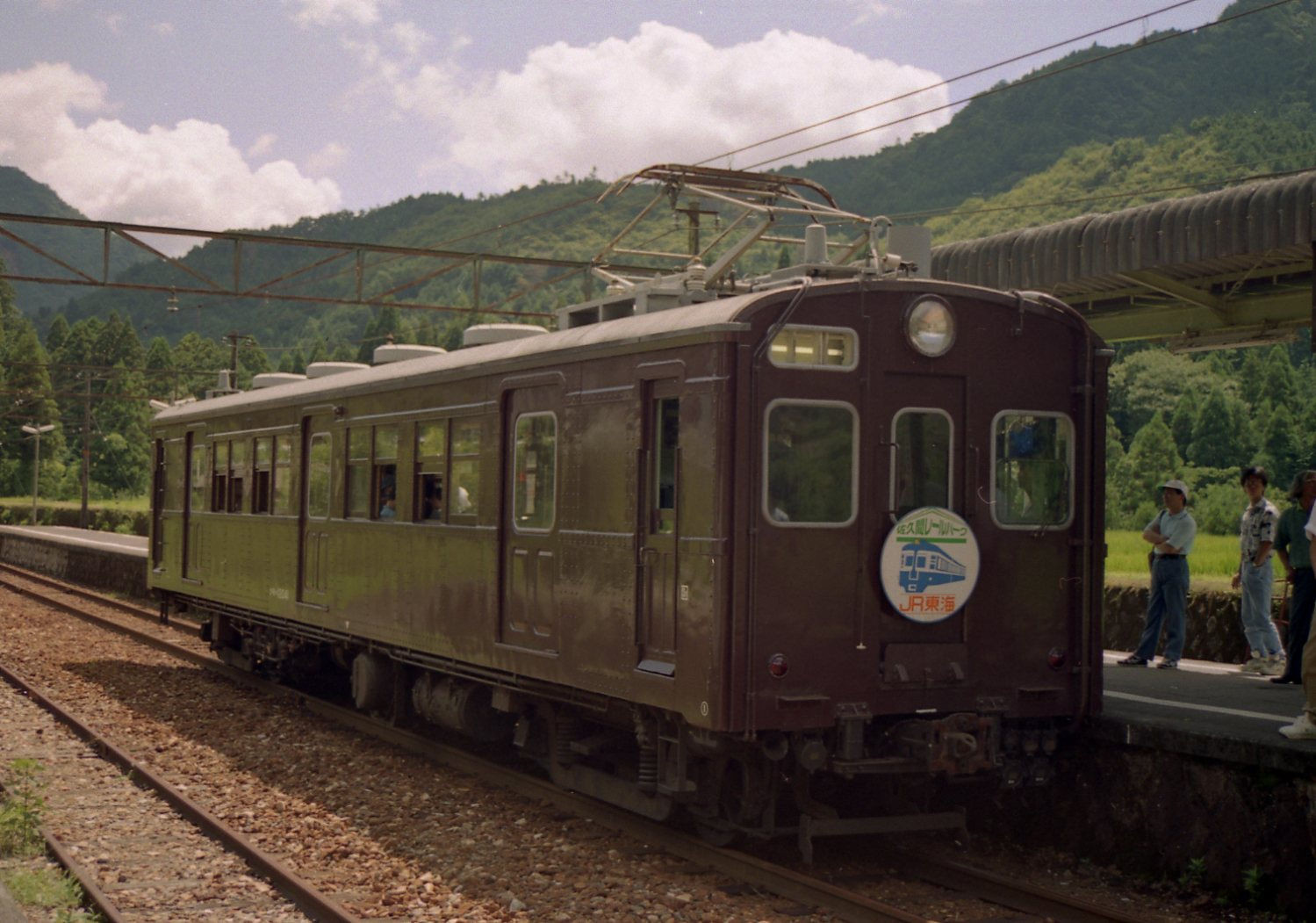
KuMoHa 12041 used by JR Central as a special-event car on the Iida Line
