= Bentembashi Station =

Railway station in Yokohama, Japan

Coordinates: 35.495972°N 139.68975°E

JI04 Bentembashi Station 弁天橋駅
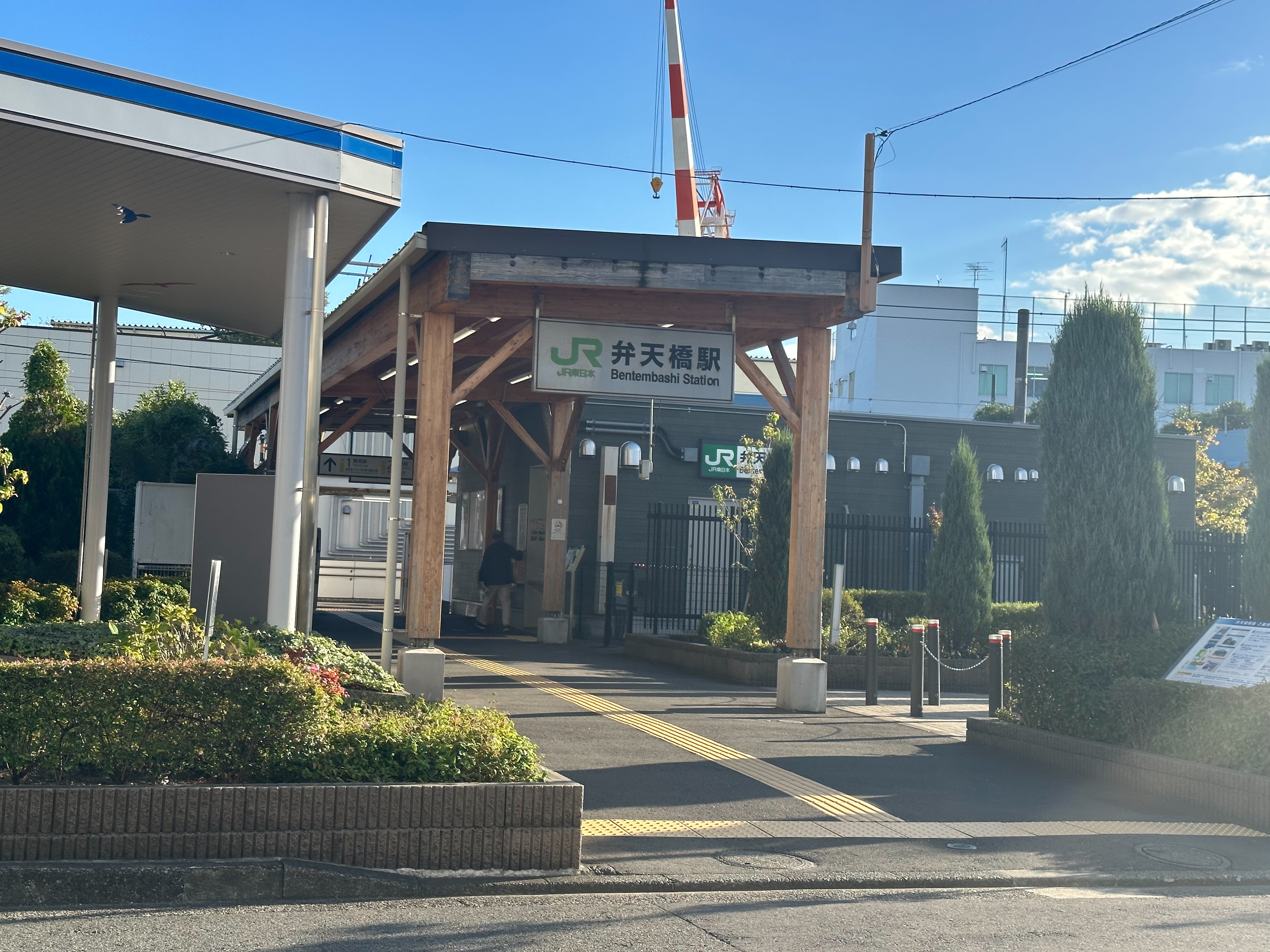
- Bentembashi Station in 2023

General information
- Location: Suehirochō 1-chōme, Tsurumi, Yokohama, Kanagawa （横浜市鶴見区末広町1丁目） Japan
- Operator: JR East
- Line: Tsurumi Line
- Connections: Bus stop

History
- Opened: 30 March 1926; 100 years ago

Passengers
- 5,416 daily

Services
Preceding station	JR East	Following station
Tsurumi-Ono JI03 towards Tsurumi	Tsurumi Line	Asano JI05 towards Ōgimachi, Umi-Shibaura or Ōkawa
Location
- Location within Kanagawa Prefecture Location within Japan

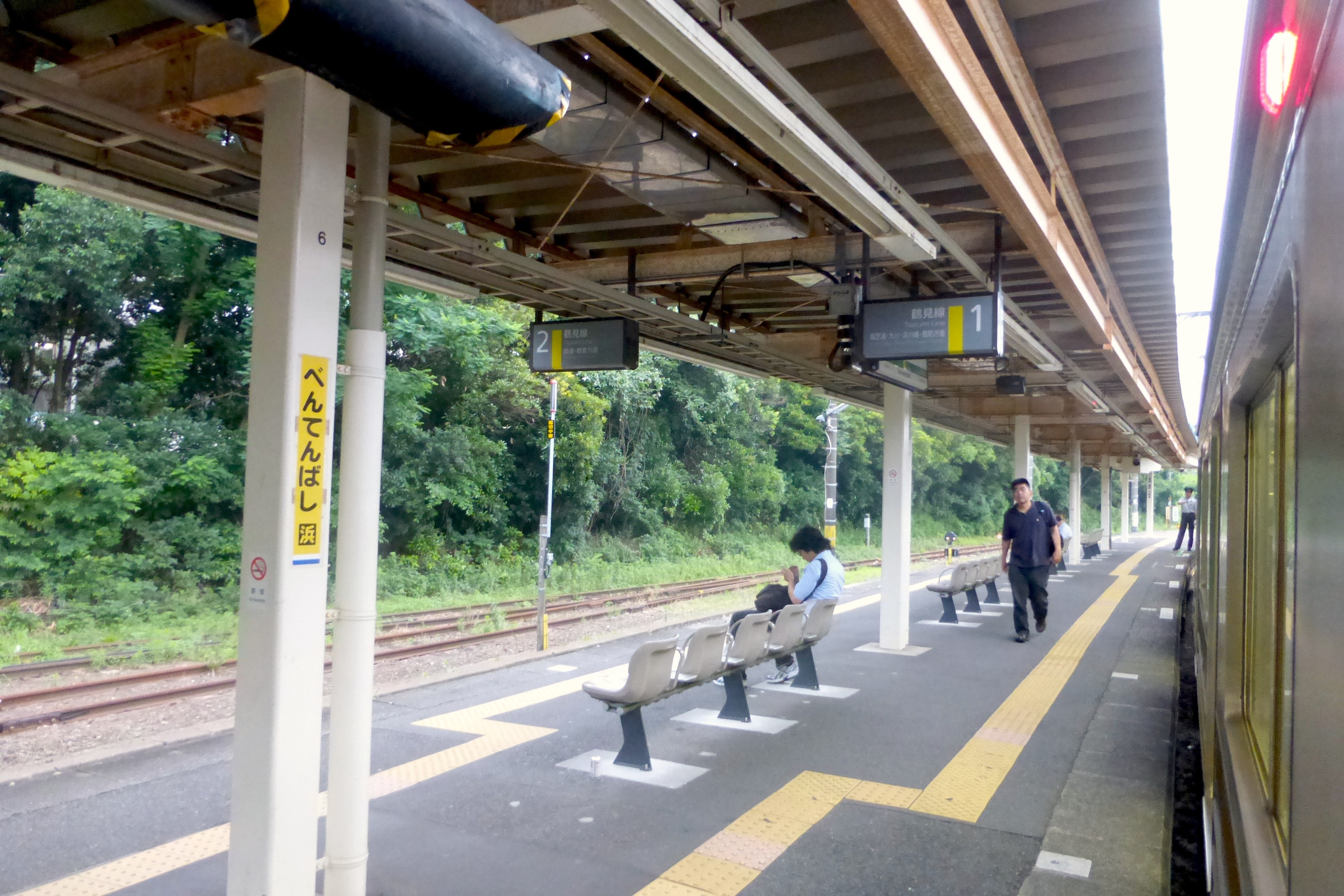
Station platforms, June 2015

Bentembashi Station (弁天橋駅, Bentenbashi-eki) is a railway station operated by East Japan Railway Company (JR East) in Tsurumi-ku, Yokohama, Kanagawa Prefecture, Japan.

== Lines ==
Bentembashi Station is served by the Tsurumi Line, and is located 2.4 kilometers (1.5 mi) from the terminus at Tsurumi Station.

== Station layout ==
Bentembashi Station has an island platform serving two tracks.

=== Platforms ===
1	Tsurumi Line	for Hama-Kawasaki, Ōgimachi, Umi-Shibaura, and Ōkawa
2	Tsurumi Line	for Tsurumi-Ono and Tsurumi

== History ==
Bentembashi Station was opened on 10 March 1926 as the initial terminal station on the privately held Tsurumi Rinkō Railway (鶴見臨港鉄道, Tsurumi Rinkō Tetsudō) and initially for freight operations only. Passenger services started from 28 October 1930 when the line was extended to Tsurumi Station. The Tsurumi Rinkō line was nationalized on 1 July 1943, and was later absorbed into the Japan National Railways (JNR) network. The station has been unstaffed since 1 March 1971. Upon the privatization of the JNR on 1 April 1987 the station has been operated by JR East.
