= Asano Station =

Railway station in Yokohama, Japan

JI05 Asano Station 浅野駅
- Asano Station entrance, July 2022

General information
- Location: 2 Suehirochō; Tsurumi, Yokohama; Japan
- Coordinates: 35°29′51″N 139°41′45″E
- Operator: JR East
- Lines: Tsurumi Main Line; Umi-Shibaura Branch
- Distance: 3 km (1.9 mi) from Tsurumi
- Platforms: 1 island platform, 2 side platforms
- Tracks: 4

Construction
- Structure type: At-grade

Other information
- Station code: JI05

History
- Opened: 30 March 1926; 100 years ago

Passengers
- JFY2008: 876 daily

Services
Preceding station	JR East	Following station
Bentembashi JI04 towards Tsurumi	Tsurumi Line Main Line and Ōkawa branch	Anzen JI06 towards Ōgimachi or Ōkawa
Bentembashi JI04 towards Tsurumi	Tsurumi Line Umi-Shibaura branch	Shin-Shibaura JI51 towards Umi-Shibaura
Location
- Location within Kanagawa Prefecture Location within Japan

Asano Station (Japanese: 浅野駅, Hepburn: Asano-eki) is a railway station operated by East Japan Railway Company (JR East) in the Tsurumi ward of Yokohama.

== Lines ==
Asano Station is served by the Tsurumi Line, and is located at the junction between the Main Line and Umi-Shibaura Branch. It is located 3 kilometers (1.9 mi) from the western terminus at Tsurumi Station.

== Station layout ==
Asano Station has an island platform (tracks 1 and 2) along the Main Line and two side platforms (tracks 3 and 4) along the Umi-Shibaura Branch.

=== Platforms ===
1	Tsurumi Line (Main Line and Ōkawa branch)	for Ōgimachi, and Ōkawa
2	Tsurumi Line (Main Line and Ōkawa branch)	for Tsurumi
3	Tsurumi Line (Umi-Shibaura branch)	for Umi-Shibaura
4	Tsurumi Line (Umi-Shibaura branch)	for Tsurumi

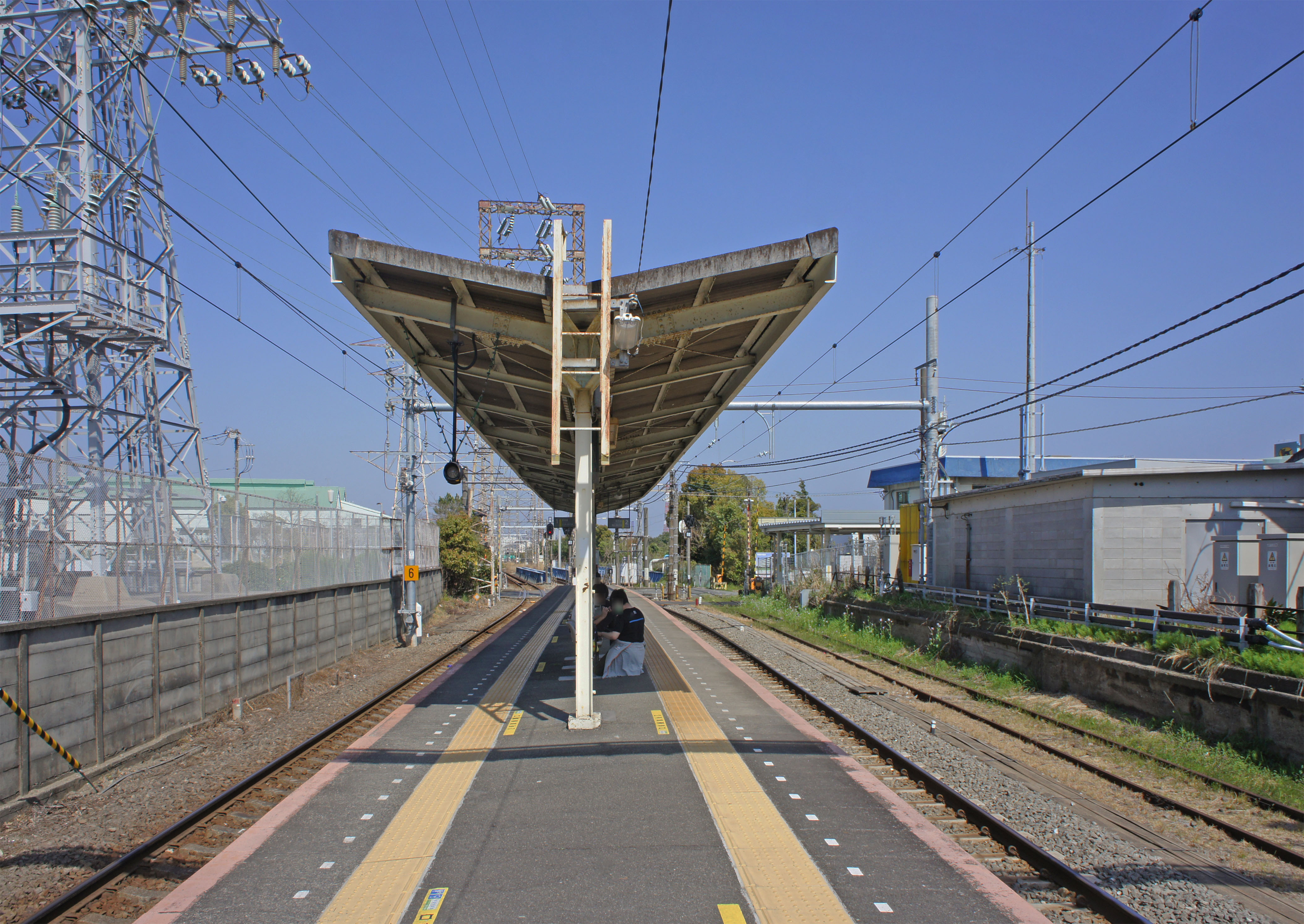
The Tsurumi Line mainline platforms (1 and 2), April 2022

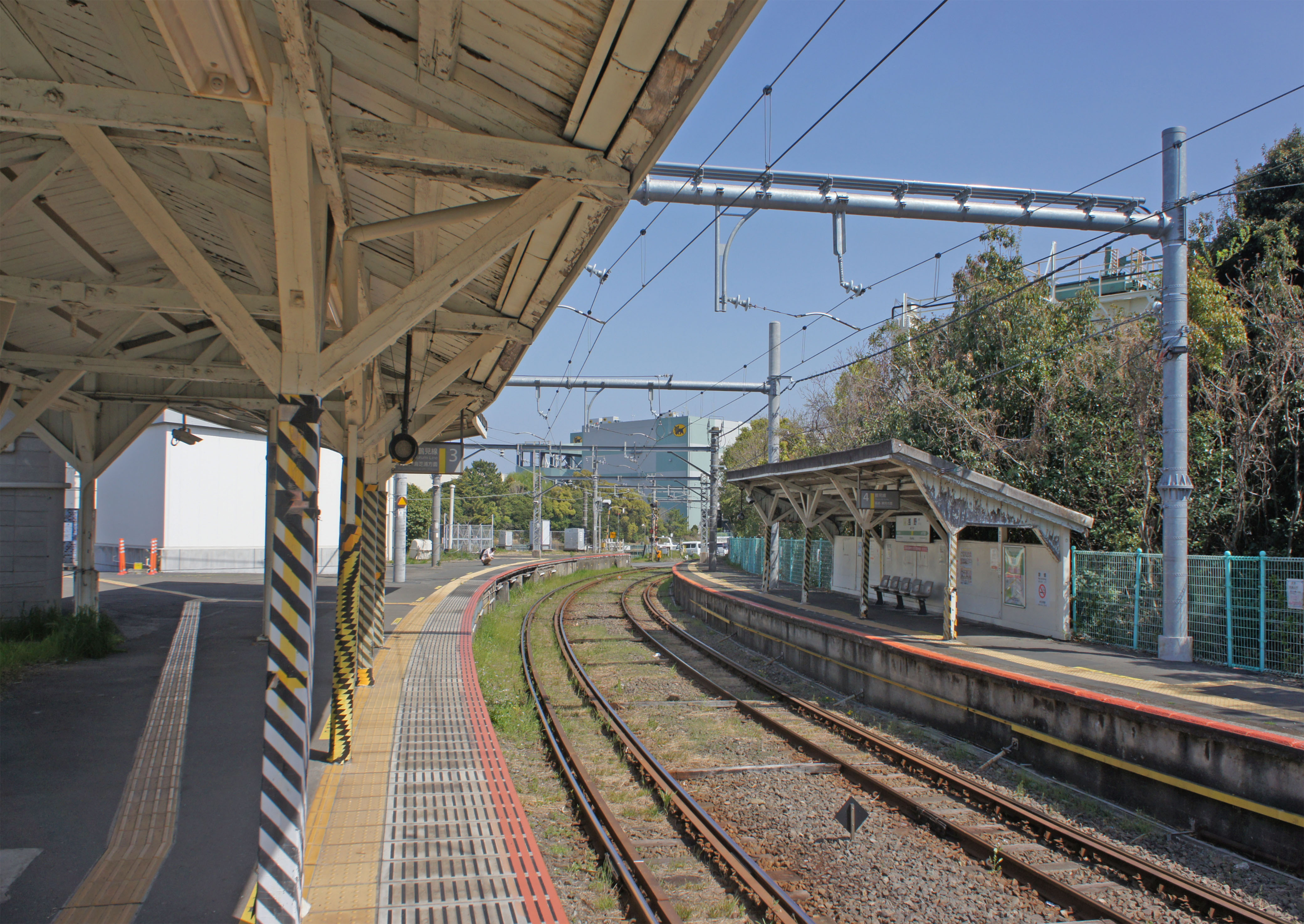
The Umi-Shibaura Branch Line platforms (3 and 4), April 2022

== History ==
The station opened on 10 March 1926, on the privately owned Tsurumi Rinkō Railway (鶴見臨港鉄道, Tsurumi Rinkō Tetsudō). The Tsurumi Rinkō line was nationalized on 1 July 1943, and was later absorbed into the Japanese National Railways (JNR) network. The station has been unstaffed since 1 March 1971. Upon the privatization of JNR on 1 April 1987, the station has been operated by JR East.

== See also ==
- List of railway stations in Japan
