= Yokohama College of Commerce =

University in Yokohama, Japan

Coordinates: 35°29′55″N 139°39′35″E

- 横浜商科大学; Yokohama shōka daigaku
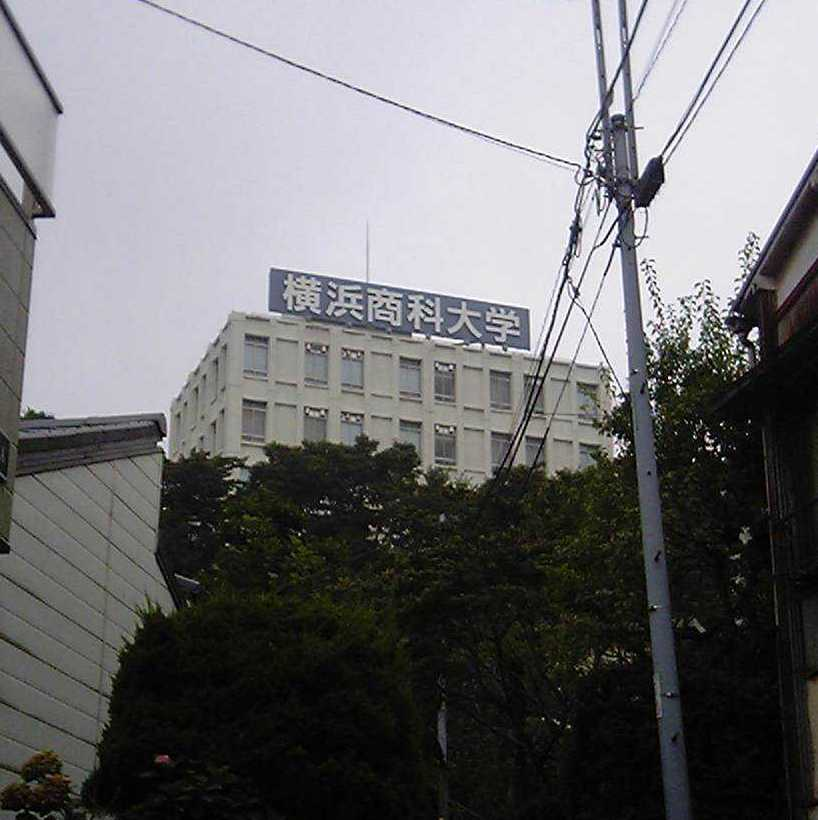
- Type: Private
- Established: 1989
- Location: Tsurumi-ku, Yokohama, Kanagawa, Japan
- Website: Official website

Yokohama College of Commerce (横浜商科大学, Yokohama shōka daigaku) is a private university in Tsurumi-ku, Yokohama, Kanagawa Prefecture, Japan.

The predecessor of the school was founded in 1941. It was chartered as a junior college in 1966 and became a four-year college two years later. A subsidiary one-year coursework campus was established in Midori-ku, Yokohama in 1995.
