= Tsurumi-ku, Yokohama =

Tsurumi 鶴見区
- Ward
- Tsurumi Ward
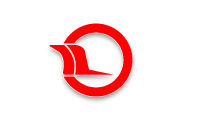
- Flag Seal

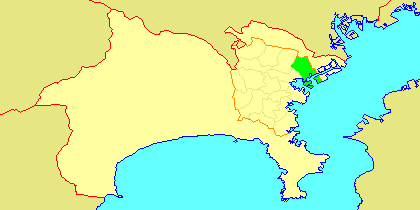
- Location of Tsurumi in Kanagawa

- Tsurumi (Japan)
- Coordinates: 35°30′30″N 139°40′57″E
- Country: Japan
- Region: Kantō
- Prefecture: Kanagawa
- City: Yokohama

Area
  - Total: 33.23 km^{2} (12.83 sq mi)

Population (February 2010)
  - Total: 270,433
  - Density: 8,140/km^{2} (21,100/sq mi)
- Time zone: UTC+9 (Japan Standard Time)
- Tree: Lagerstroemia indica
- Flower: Scarlet sage
- Address: 3-20-1 Tsurumi-chuō, Tsurumi-ku Yokohama-shi, Kanagawa-ken; 230-0051
- Website: Tsurumi Ward Office

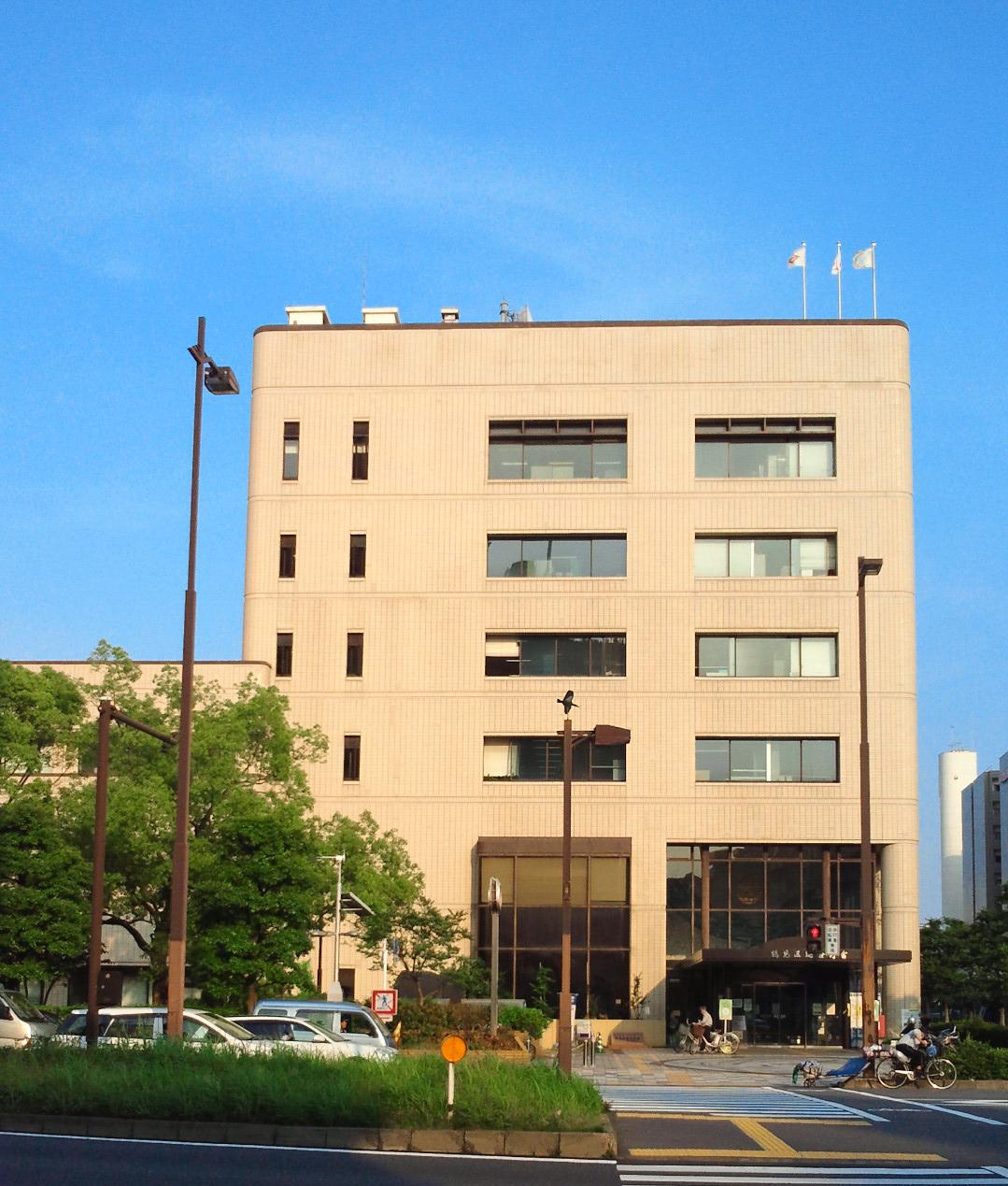
Tsurumi Ward Office

Tsurumi-ku (鶴見区) is one of the 18 ku (wards) of the city of Yokohama in Kanagawa Prefecture, Japan. As of 2010, the ward had an estimated population of 270,433 and a density of 8,140 persons per km^{2}. The total area is 33.23 km^{2}.

== Geography ==
Tsurumi-ku is located in eastern Kanagawa Prefecture, in the northeast corner of the city of Yokohama.

=== Surrounding municipalities ===
- Kanagawa Ward
- Kōhoku Ward
- Kawasaki

== History ==
The area around present-day Tsurumi Ward has been inhabited continuously for thousands of years. Archaeologists have found stone tools from the Japanese Paleolithic period and ceramic shards from the Jōmon period, and tombs from the Kofun period at numerous locations in the area. Under the Nara period Ritsuryō system, it became part of Musashi Province. During the Edo period, the territory came under the control of Tokugawa Ieyasu. It was administered as tenryō territory controlled directly by the Tokugawa shogunate, but administered through various hatamoto. During the Bakumatsu period, nearby Kanagawa-juku was the location of the signing of the Convention of Kanagawa, which ended Japan's national isolation policy and led to the normalization of diplomatic relations between the United States and Japan. The subsequent Treaty of Amity and Commerce led to the establishment of a treaty port for foreign commerce and settlement, which was initially stipulated to be Kanagawa. However, for security reasons, the actual settlement was established at neighboring Yokohama (present day Naka-ku). The Namamugi Incident, which led to the 1863 Anglo-Satsuma War, occurred in what is now part of Tsurumi Ward.

Under the Ritsuryō system of antiquity, the area was part of the Tachibana District of Musashi Province. In the Meiji Restoration, the district became part of Kanagawa Prefecture in 1868. Tsurumi was connected to Yokohama and Tokyo by train in 1872, and the area rapidly urbanized. Sōji-ji, the head temple of the Sōtō sect of Zen Buddhism relocated to Tsurumi from Ishikawa Prefecture in 1911. Tsurumi suffered severe damage from the 1923 Great Kantō earthquake. In April 1924, Tsurumi became a town within Tachibana District. On October 1, 1927, Tsurumi became a ward within the city of Yokohama. The area suffered greatly again during World War II, and was completely devastated during the massive Yokohama air raid of May 29, 1945. The area soon rebuilt after the end of the war, assisted by an influx of educational facilities in the 1950s and rapid re-industrialization of the area in the 1950s and 1960s. The Tsurumi railway accident occurred near Tsurumi Station on November 9, 1963, killing 161 people. The population of Tsurumi Ward surpassed 260,000 people in 2007, and celebrated the 80th anniversary of its foundation in 2009.

== Economy ==
Tsurumi Ward is a regional commercial center and bedroom community for central Yokohama and Tokyo. The coastal area is part of the Keihin Industrial Zone, and is the most industrialized region within Yokohama. Major factories are operated by:

- ExxonMobil (Anzencho 2-chome)
- JFE Steel (Oogijima) - JFE's main plant for eastern Japan is on the border of Tsurumi-ku and Kawasaki-ku, Kawasaki.
- Kirin Brewery (Namamugi 1-chome)
- Nissan Motors (Kanagawa)
- Toshiba (Suehirocho 2-chome) - Toshiba's largest factory is located on Tokyo Bay and has its own JR train station, Umi-Shibaura Station.
- Morinaga & Company
- Asahi Glass Co.
- J-OIL MILLS, Inc
- Tokyo Electric Power Company

Daikokufuto, an artificial island in Tokyo Bay, is a major warehousing center.

== Transportation ==
=== Railroads ===
- East Japan Railway Company –Keihin-Tohoku Line
  - Tsurumi
- East Japan Railway Company - Nambu Line
  - Shitte, Yako
- Keihin Electric Express Railway - Keikyū Main Line
  - Tsurumi-ichiba Station, Keikyū Tsurumi, Kagetsuen-mae, Namamugi
- East Japan Railway Company - Tsurumi Line
  - Tsurumi, Kokudo, Tsurumi-Ono, Bentenbashi, Asano, Anzen, Shin-Shibaura, Umi-Shibaura

=== Highways ===
- Shuto Expressway B, K1 and K5 Routes
- National Route 1 (No. 2 Keihin Route)
- National Route 15 (No. 1 Keihin Route)

==== Prefecture roads ====
- Kanagawa Prefecture Road 6
- Kanagawa Prefecture Road 14
- Kanagawa Prefecture Road 101
- Kanagawa Prefecture Road 111
- Kanagawa Prefecture Road 140

==== Sightseeing spots ====
Sojiji Temple - Soji-ji was founded in 740. It is one of the two biggest head temples (daihonzan) of the Soto school of Zen Buddhism. The temple ground covers an area of nearly 50,000 square meters. Soji-ji was rebuilt in Yokohama in 1911, after it burned down at its old location in Wajima City, Ishikawa Prefecture.

Address: Sojiji Temple, 2-1-1 Tsurumi, Tsurumi-ku, Yokohama-shi, Kanagawa-ken

Tsurumi University - The university was founded in 1925. It has a great campus with lots of greenery. The total student population is 3,099. It is located very close to the Soji-ji Temple.

Mitsuike Park - Mitsuike Koen is a common choice for a garden stroll. A popular time to visit is during the cherry blossom season, when 1,600 trees from 78 different species are in full bloom. You will find there, a Korean Garden, three ponds and two walking trails.

== Education ==
Colleges and universities

- RIKEN Yokohama Institute
- Tsurumi University
- Yokohama College of Commerce

Kanagawa Prefectural Board of Education operates prefectural high schools.

- Tsurumi High School
- Tsurumi-Sogo High School

Yokohama Municipal Board of Education operates municipal high schools:

- Higashi High School
- Yokohama Science Frontier High School and Attached Junior High School

Private high schools:

- Hakuho Girls' High School
- Hosei University Kokusai High School
- St. Joseph Gakuen Junior and Senior High School
- Tachibana Gakuen Junior and Senior High School

The municipal board of education operates municipal elementary and junior high schools.

Junior high schools:

- Kaminomiya (上の宮)
- Kansei (寛政)
- Ichiba (市場)
- Namamugi (生麦)
- Sueyoshi (末吉)
- Terao (寺尾)
- Tsurumi (鶴見)
- Ushioda (潮田)
- Yakou (矢向)
- Attached Junior High School of Yokohama Science Frontier High School

Elementary schools:

- Asahi (旭)
- Baba (馬場)
- Heian (平安)
- Higashidai (東台)
- Ichiba (市場)
- Irifune (入船)
- Kamisueyoshi (上末吉)
- Kamiterao (上寺尾)
- Kishiya (岸谷)
- Komaoka (駒岡)
- Namamugi (生麦)
- Shimosueyoshi (下末吉)
- Shin Tsurumi (新鶴見)
- Shioiri (汐入)
- Shishigaya (獅子ケ谷)
- Shitanoya (下野谷)
- Sueyoshi (末吉)
- Terao (寺尾)
- Toyooka (豊岡)
- Tsurumi (鶴見)
- Ushioda (潮田)
- Yako (矢向)

Additionally, the zone of Kikuna Elementary School (菊名小学校), not in Tsurumi-ku, includes a part of Tsurumi-ku.

International schools:

- Tsurumi Korean Primary School (鶴見朝鮮初級学校) - North Korean international school - Kindergarten and primary school
- Horizon Japan International School

== Notable people from Tsurumi Ward ==
- Kanna Arihara, singer
- Antonio Inoki, professional wrestler, politician
- Shingo Katori, singer, actor
- Yasuhiro Kojima, professional wrestler
- Akina Minami, gravure idol and actress
- Yutaka Niida, professional boxer
- Yakkun Sakurazuka, comedian, voice actor
- Junpei Shinoda, professional baseball player
- Fumie Suguri, professional figure skater
- Kōta Takai, professional football player
- Miri Yu, author
- Jo Asakura, singer from Japanese Boy group &TEAM
