= Tokyo Metropolitan Road and Kanagawa Prefectural Road Route 6 =

Road in Tokyo and Kanagawa Prefecture, Japan

Tokyo Metropolitan Road and Kanagawa Prefectural Road Route 6 東京都道・神奈川県道6号東京大師横浜線

Route information
- Length: 10.8 km (6.7 mi)

Major junctions
- From: Ōta, Tokyo
- To: Tsurumi-ku, Yokohama, Kanagawa

Location
- Country: Japan

Highway system
- National highways of Japan; Expressways of Japan

Tokyo Metropolitan Road and Kanagawa Prefectural Road Route 6 (東京都道・神奈川県道6号東京大師横浜線, Tōkyōto-dō Kanagawa kendō 6-gō Tōkyō Daishi Yokohama-sen) is a principle local road that stretches from Ōta in Tokyo to Tsurumi-ku, Yokohama in Kanagawa.

== Route description ==
Tokyo Metropolitan Road and Kanagawa Prefectural Road Route 6 has a total length of 10.8 kilometers (6.7 mi). The Tokyo, Kawasaki and Yokohama sections of the road have a length of 763, 6,540, and 3,520 m respectively.
