= Tsurumi Station =

Railway station in Yokohama, Japan

Coordinates: 35°30′31″N 139°40′34″E

JK15 JI01 Tsurumi Station 鶴見駅
- East side of Tsurumi Station, 2024

General information
- Location: 1 Tsurumi-Chūō, Tsurumi, Yokohama, Kanagawa （神奈川県横浜市鶴見区鶴見中央１丁目） Japan
- Operator: JR East
- Lines: Keihin-Tōhoku Line; Tsurumi Line
- Connections: Bus terminal

History
- Opened: 15 November 1872; 153 years ago

Passengers
- FY2013: 78,272 daily

Services
Preceding station	JR East	Following station
Shin-Koyasu JK14 towards Yokohama	Keihin–Tōhoku Line Rapid Local	Kawasaki towards Ōmiya
Terminus	Tsurumi Line	Kokudō JI02 towards Ōgimachi, Umi-Shibaura or Ōkawa
Location
- Location within Kanagawa Prefecture Location within Japan

Tsurumi Station (鶴見駅, Tsurumi-eki) is a railway station in Tsurumi-ku, Yokohama, Kanagawa Prefecture, Japan, operated by East Japan Railway Company (JR East).

== Lines ==
Tsurumi Station is an interchange between the Keihin-Tōhoku Line and the Tsurumi Line (of which it is a terminus), and is 52.0 km from the northern terminus of the Keihin-Tōhoku Line at Ōmiya Station. The Tokkaido Line, Shonan Shinjuku Line, and Yokosuka Line, as well as a JR freight line all pass through the station.

== Station layout ==
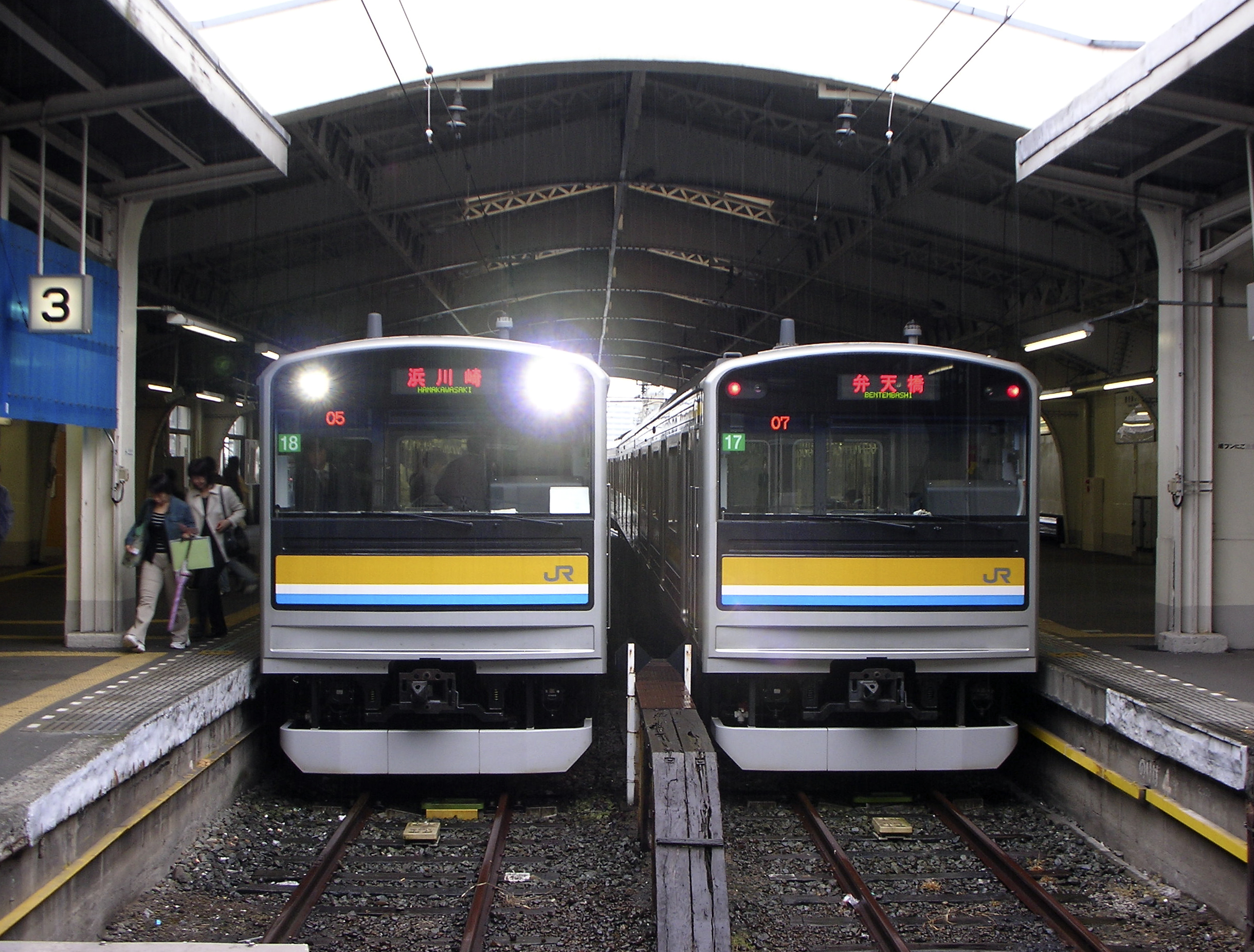
205 series trains at the Tsurumi Line platforms

Tsurumi Station is an elevated station with one island platform for the Keihin-Tōhoku Line, and two opposed side platforms for the Tsurumi Line.

From the north side of the Keihin-Tōhoku Line platform are located, in order, The Tokaido Line passenger train lines in both directions, The Tokaido Line Tokyo-bound freight train tracks, three tracks for trains to stop at overnight, and the Tokaido Line freight train tracks for the direction from Tokyo. None of these have platforms.

Between the Keihin-Tōhoku Line and Tsurumi Line there is a ticket gate, which is a remnant of when the Tsurumi Line was operated by the separate Tsurumi Rinkō Tetsudō Kabushiki Gaisha (鶴見臨港鉄道株式会社).

There is a Midori no Madoguchi staffed ticket office as well as automatic ticket gates. The Keihin-Tōhoku Line platforms are connected to the concourse by escalators and elevators.

=== Platforms ===
1	Keihin-Tōhoku Line	for Higashi-Kanagawa, Yokohama, Isogo, and Ōfuna
2	Keihin-Tōhoku Line	for Kawasaki, Shinagawa, Tokyo, Ueno, and Ōmiya
3, 4	Tsurumi Line	for Tsurumi-Ono, Asano, Ōgimachi, Umi-Shibaura, and Ōkawa

== History ==
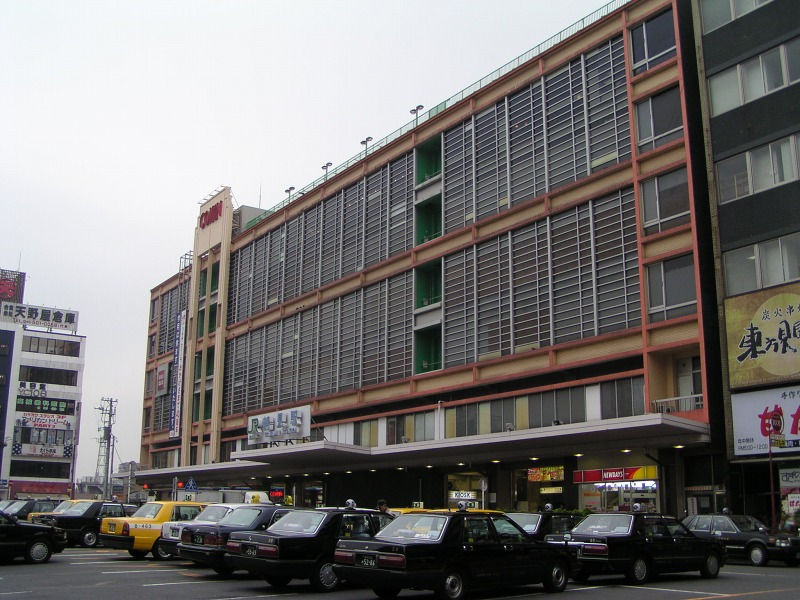
Former station building, November 2005

Tsurumi Station was opened on 15 November 1872, as a station on the Japanese Government Railways (the predecessor to the Japanese National Railways) Tōkaidō Main Line, initially for passenger operations only. Freight services started on 1 April 1898. The Keihin Line began operations to Tsurumi from 20 December 1914. On 23 December 1934, the Tsurumi Rinkō Railway (present-day Tsurumi Line) connected to Tsurumi Station. The station was the location of a major railway accident, the Tsurumi Accident on 9 November 1963. It was one of the five major post-war JNR accidents. Upon the privatization of JNR on 1 April 1987, the station has been operated by JR East.

== Passenger statistics ==
In fiscal 2013, the station was used by an average of 78,272 passengers daily (boarding passengers only), making it the 56th-busiest station operated by JR East. The daily average passenger figures (boarding passengers only) in previous years are as shown below.

Fiscal year	Daily average
2000	75,234
2005	76,197
2010	76,665
2011	76,445
2012	76,583
2013	78,272

== Surrounding area ==
- Sojiji temple
- Tsurumi University
- Tsurumi Ward Office
- Tsurumi Beach
