= Tsurumi University =

Private university in Yokohama, Japan

Coordinates: 35°30′20″N 139°40′26″E

- 鶴見大学 鶴見大学;Tsurumi Daigaku
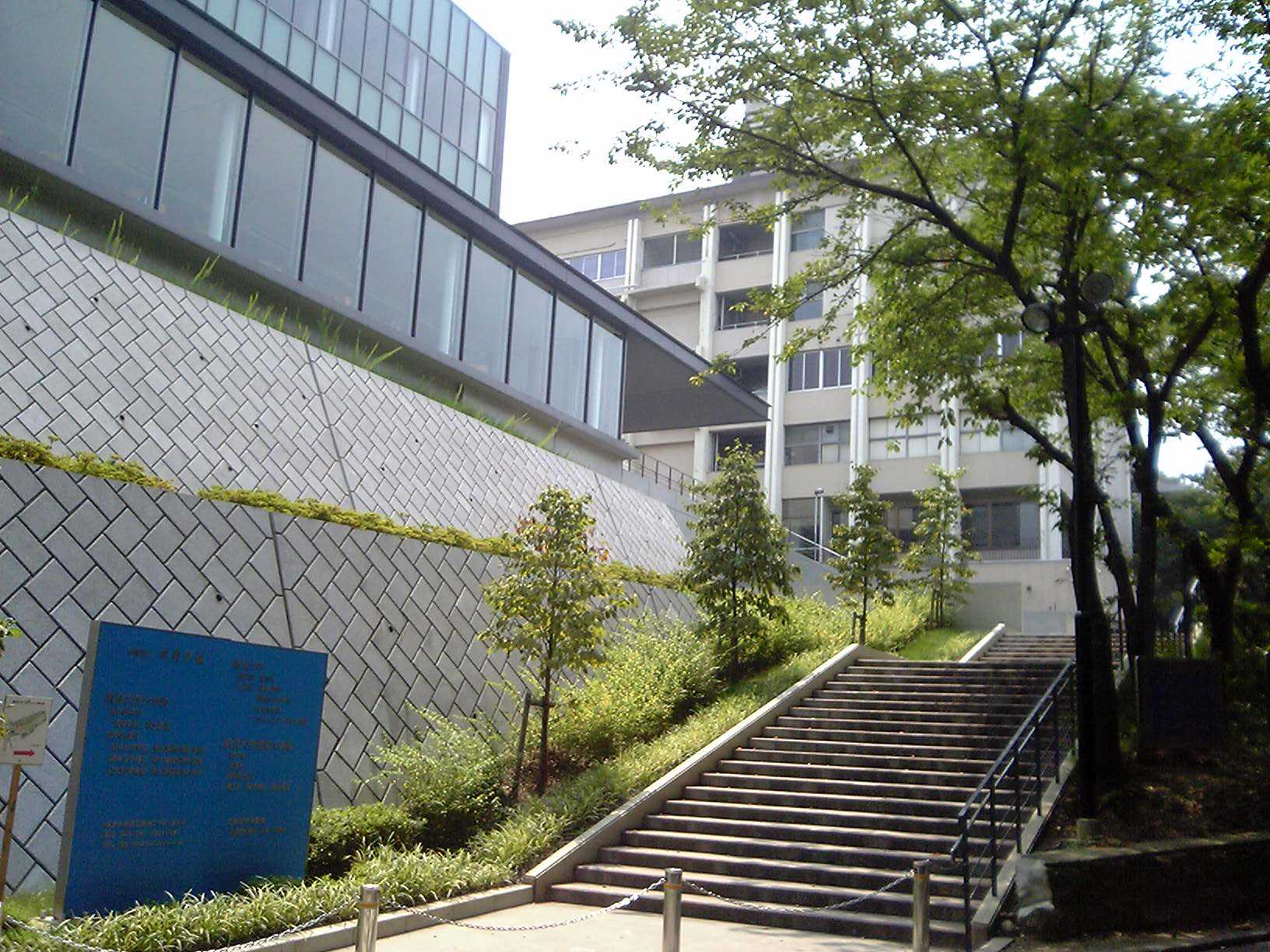
- Tsurumi University
- Type: Private
- Established: 1953
- Location: Yokohama, Kanagawa, Kanagawa, Japan
- Website: Official website

Tsurumi University (鶴見大学, Tsurumi Daigaku) is a private university in Tsurumi-ku, Yokohama, Kanagawa, Japan.

== History ==
Tsurumi University traces its origin to Tsurumi Girls' High School, which was established in 1925. In 1953, Tsurumi Girls' Junior College was established, and it was chartered as Tsurumi Girls' University in 1963. In 1973, the name was changed to Tsurumi University, when boys were admitted. It continues as a co-ed university.

== Departments ==
Tsurumi University comprises the School of Dental Medicine (six-year program), the School of Literature (four-year program), and Tsurumi Junior College (two-year program for the Department of Early Childhood Care and Education and three-year program for the Department of Dental Hygiene). Graduate programs are available in both the School of Dental Medicine and the School of Literature.

The Tsurumi University School of Literature has four departments: Japanese Literature, English and American Language and Literature, Cultural Properties, and Library, Archival and Information Studies.

== Faculty and students ==
At Tsurumi University, there are 498 faculty members for a student population of 3099 (2014 data).

Some major facilities of Tsurumi University are the Tsurumi University Dental Hospital, the Tsurumi University Library, the Institute of Buddhist Culture, and the Tsurumi University Center for International Exchange.

== Mascots ==
The official mascot characters of Tsurumi University are Tsurumin and Tsurutan.

== Sports teams ==
The university is well-known in Japan for having a strong baseball program.

== Access ==
Tsurumi University is between the cities of Kawasaki and Yokohama, close to Tokyo. Access is by the JR Keihin-Tohoku, Tsurumi and Keikyu lines, as well as the Yokohama Municipal Bus System. Students come from all over Kanagawa Prefecture and the Greater Tokyo Area, as well as from other regions of Japan.
