= Tsurumi Line =

Railway line in Kanagawa prefecture, Japan

- E131-1000 series EMU on the Tsurumi Line in February 2024

Overview
- Owner: JR East
- Locale: Kanagawa Prefecture, Japan
- Termini: Tsurumi; Ōgimachi
- Stations: 13

Service
- Services: 3
- Rolling stock: E131-1000 series

History
- Opened: 10 March 1926; 100 years ago

Technical
- Line length: Main Line: 7 km (4.3 mi); Umi-Shibaura Branch: 1.7 km (1.1 mi); Ōkawa Branch: 1.6 km (0.99 mi); Total: 10.3 km (6.4 mi)
- Number of tracks: 2 (Main Line: Tsurumi–Hama-Kawasaki); 1 (branches, Main Line: Hama-Kawasaki–Ōgimachi)
- Track gauge: 1,067 mm (3 ft 6 in)
- Electrification: Overhead line, 1,500 V DC
- Operating speed: 85 km/h (53 mph)
- Train protection system: ATS-P
Route map

The Tsurumi Line (Japanese: 鶴見線, Hepburn: Tsurumi-sen) is a group of three railway lines operated by East Japan Railway Company (JR East) in Kanagawa Prefecture, Japan. The network consists of a main line and two branches serving the port and industrial areas of Yokohama and Kawasaki. Passenger services operate between Tsurumi and Ōgimachi, as well as on two short branches to Umi-Shibaura and Ōgimachi. The lines have a combined route length of 10.3 kilometres (6.4 mi), use a rail gauge of 1,067 mm (3 ft 6 in), and are electrified at 1,500 V DC. Two sections are double-tracked.

Japan Freight Railway Company (JR Freight) operates freight services on three sections of the Tsurumi Line, primarily transporting petroleum and other chemicals produced by refineries and factories in the surrounding industrial area. The line is also used to transport jet fuel from the United States Navy fuel depot near Anzen Station via the Musashino Line to Yokota Air Base in western Tokyo.

== Station list ==
- All stations are located in Kanagawa Prefecture.
- Trains stop at every station.
- The Ōkawa branch is served during peak hours only.

Service	No.	Station	Distance in km (mi)		Transfers	Location
Service	No.	Station	Between stations	From Tsurumi	Transfers	Location
	JI01	Tsurumi 鶴見	—N/a	0 (0)	Keihin-Tōhoku Line (JK15); Keikyu Main Line (KK29: Keikyū-Tsurumi)	Tsurumi-ku, Yokohama
	JI02	Kokudō 国道	0.9 (0.56)	0.9 (0.56)		Tsurumi-ku, Yokohama
	JI03	Tsurumi-Ono 鶴見小野	0.6 (0.37)	1.5 (0.93)		Tsurumi-ku, Yokohama
	JI04	Bentembashi 弁天橋	0.9 (0.56)	2.4 (1.5)		Tsurumi-ku, Yokohama
	JI05	Asano 浅野	0.6 (0.37)	3.0 (1.9)		Tsurumi-ku, Yokohama
	JI51	Shin-Shibaura 新芝浦	0.9 (0.56) (Note: Distance from Asano)	3.9 (2.4)		Tsurumi-ku, Yokohama
	JI52	Umi-Shibaura 海芝浦	0.8 (0.50)	4.7 (2.9)		Tsurumi-ku, Yokohama
	JI06	Anzen 安善	0.5 (0.31)	3.5 (2.2)		Tsurumi-ku, Yokohama
	JI61	Ōkawa 大川	1.6 (0.99)	5.1 (3.2)		Kawasaki-ku, Kawasaki
	JI07	Musashi-Shiraishi 武蔵白石	0.6 (0.37)	4.1 (2.5)		Kawasaki-ku, Kawasaki
	JI08	Hama-Kawasaki 浜川崎	1.6 (0.99)	5.7 (3.5)	Nambu Line (JN54; Branch Line)	Kawasaki-ku, Kawasaki
	JI09	Shōwa 昭和	0.7 (0.43)	6.4 (4.0)		Kawasaki-ku, Kawasaki
	JI10	Ōgimachi 扇町	0.6 (0.37)	7.0 (4.3)		Kawasaki-ku, Kawasaki

== Rolling stock ==
- E131-1000 series 3-car EMUs (since 24 December 2023)

Eight new-build 3-car E131-1000 series EMU trainsets were introduced on the line from 24 December 2023 as a successor to the 205–1100 series fleet.

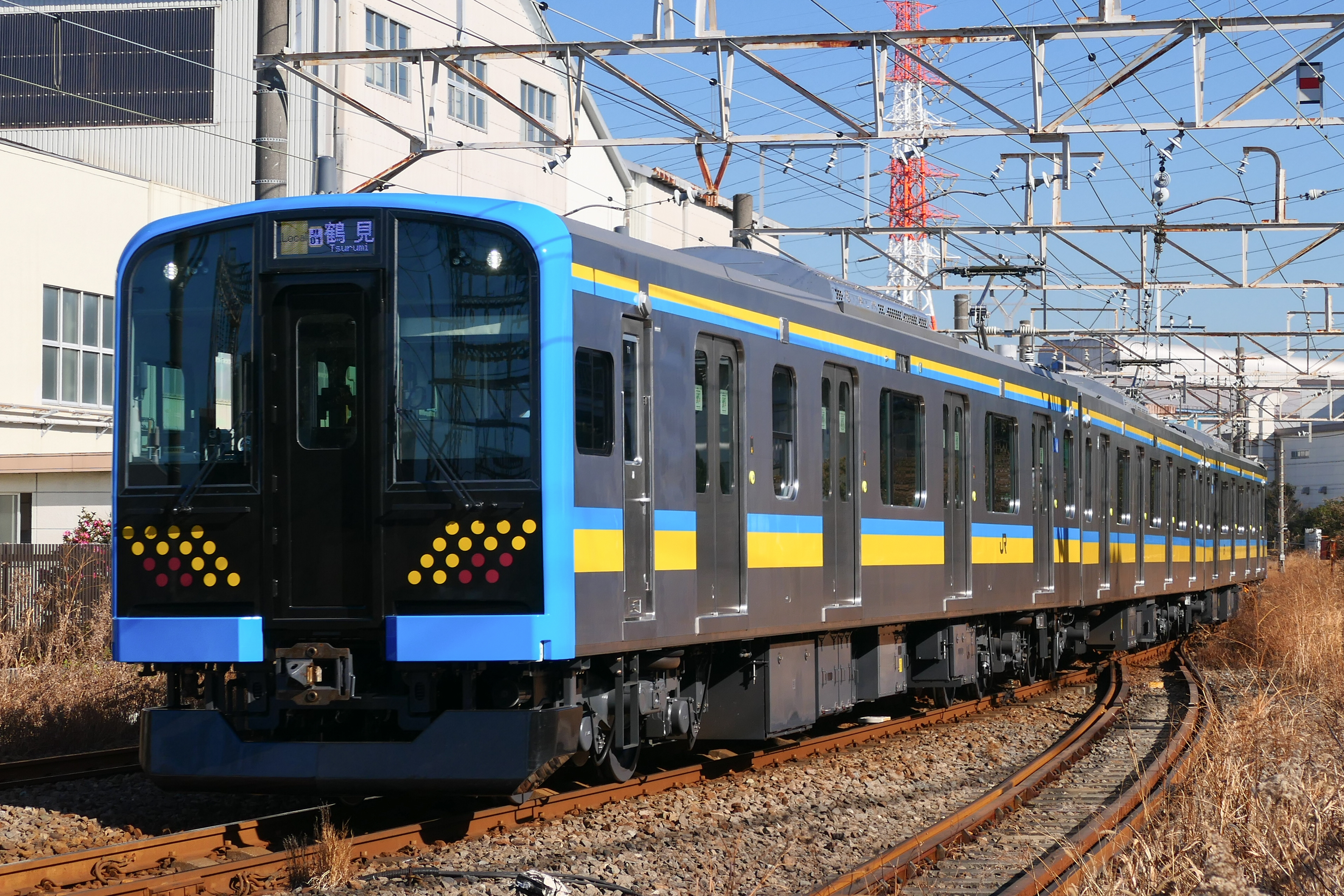
A Tsurumi Line E131-1000 series EMU, January 2024

=== Former ===
- KuMoHa 12 (Ōkawa Branch Line service, from December 1972 until March 1996)
- 72 series (from 1972 until January 1980)
- 101 series (from 1980 until March 1992)
- 103 series (from 2 August 1990 until 17 March 2006)
- 205-1100 series 3-car EMUs (from 25 August 2004 until 27 February 2024)
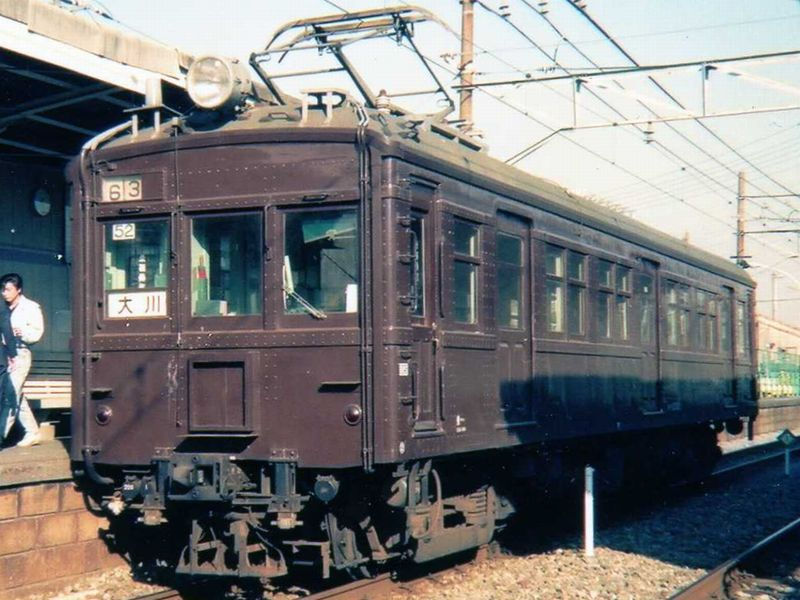
A KuMoHa 12 car on the Ōkawa Branch Line in 1992

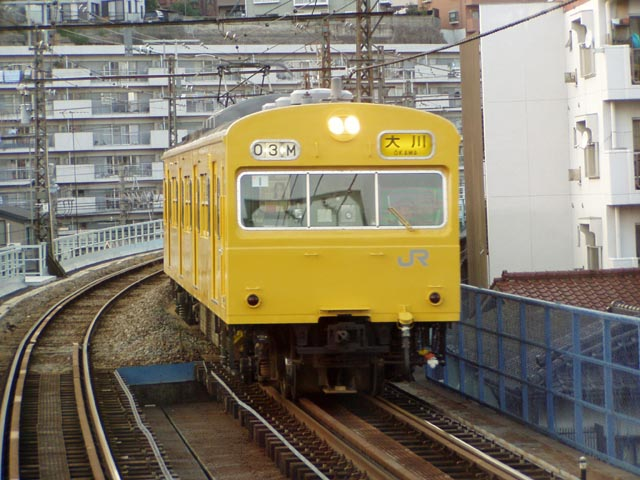
A 103 series train on the Tsurumi Line in 2005

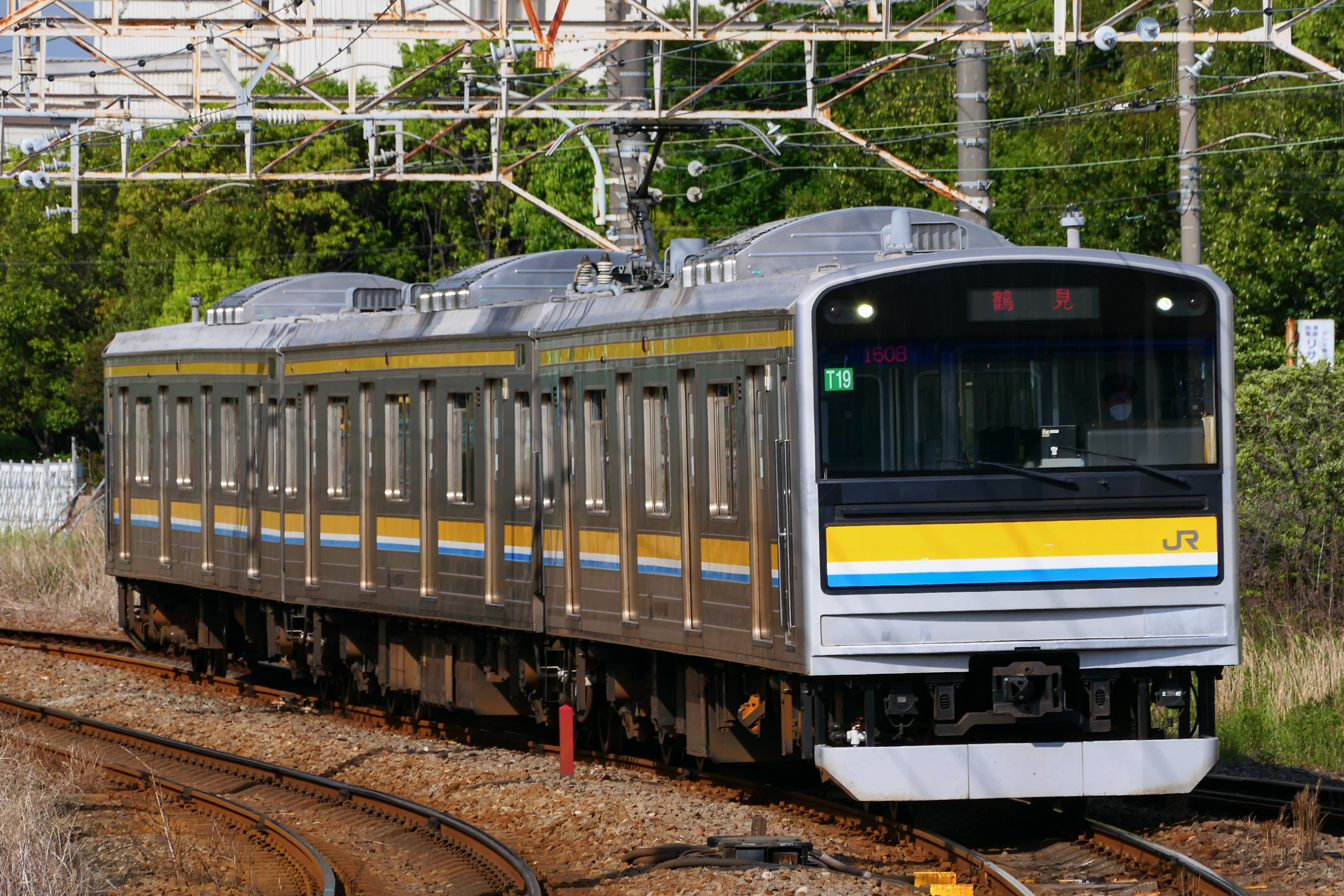
A Tsurumi Line 205–1100 series EMU, May 2023

=== Freight ===
Locomotives seen hauling freight trains include the EF65 and DE10.

== Other ==
A shuttle bus for Toshiba employees runs in a loop between Asano, Shin-Shibaura, and Umi-Shibaura stations on a schedule alternating with Tsurumi Line trains. Both the bus and the stops are marked with the Toshiba logo.

== History ==
The Tsurumi Port Railway (鶴見臨港鉄道, Tsurumi Rinkō Tetsudō) opened the Bentembashi to Hama-Kawasaki line, including the branch to Okawa in 1926, and extended the mainline to Ogimachi in 1928. In 1930, the Tsurumi to Bentembashi section opened, the lines were electrified at 600 V DC, and passenger services commenced on both lines. The Asano to Shin-Shibaura section opened as a freight-only line in 1932, and was extended to Umi-Shibaura in 1940, with passenger services commencing upon the opening of the extension.

The company was nationalised in 1943, and in 1948 the voltage was increased to 1,500 V DC.

On 20 August 2016, station numbering was introduced with Tsurumi line stations being assigned station numbers between JI01 and JI10. Station numbers were also introduced to the Umi-Shibaura branch (station numbers JI51 and JI52) as well as the Ōkawa branch (station number JI61).

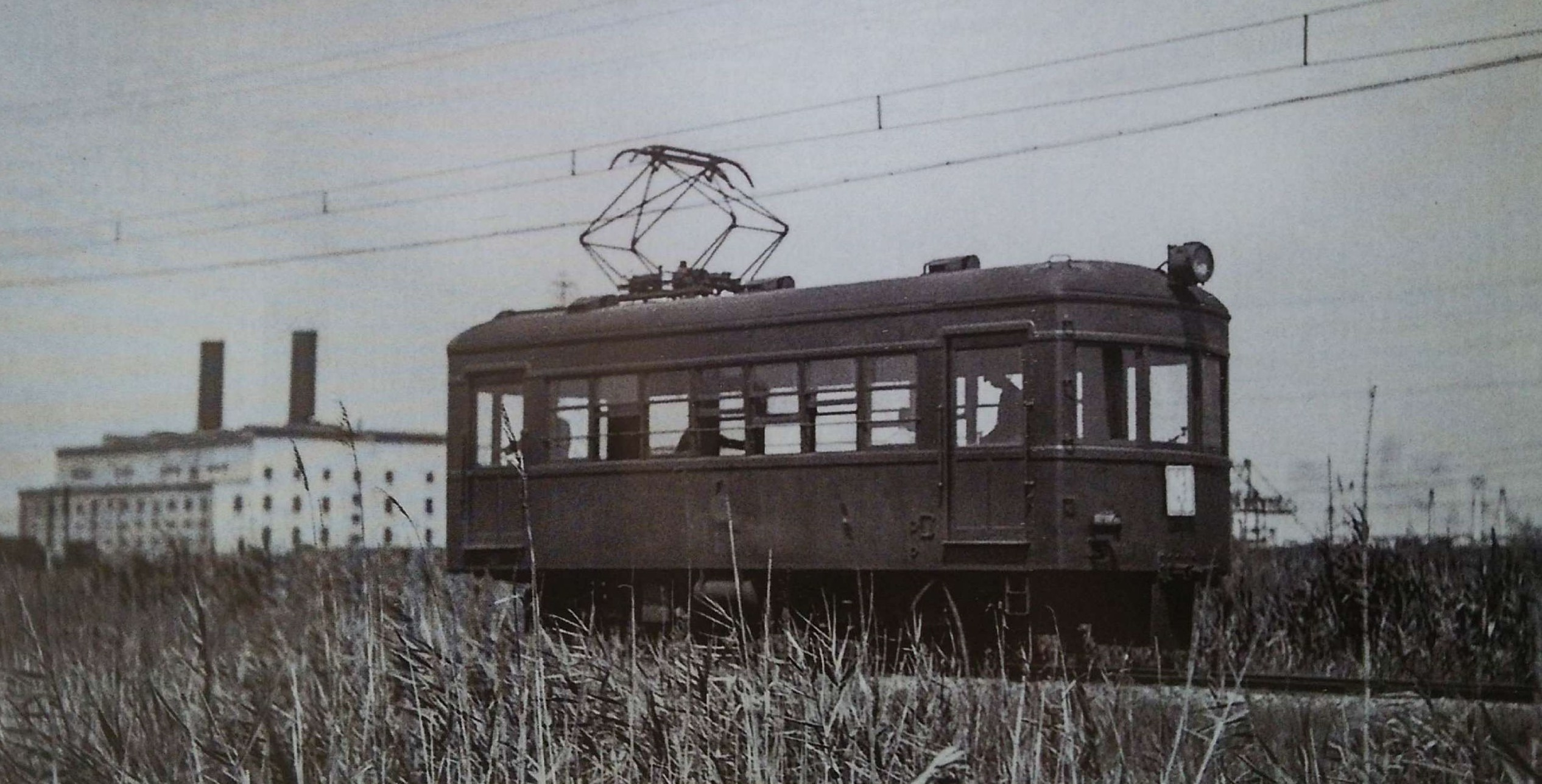
Tsurumi Rinko Railway MoHa 51 electric car in August 1939

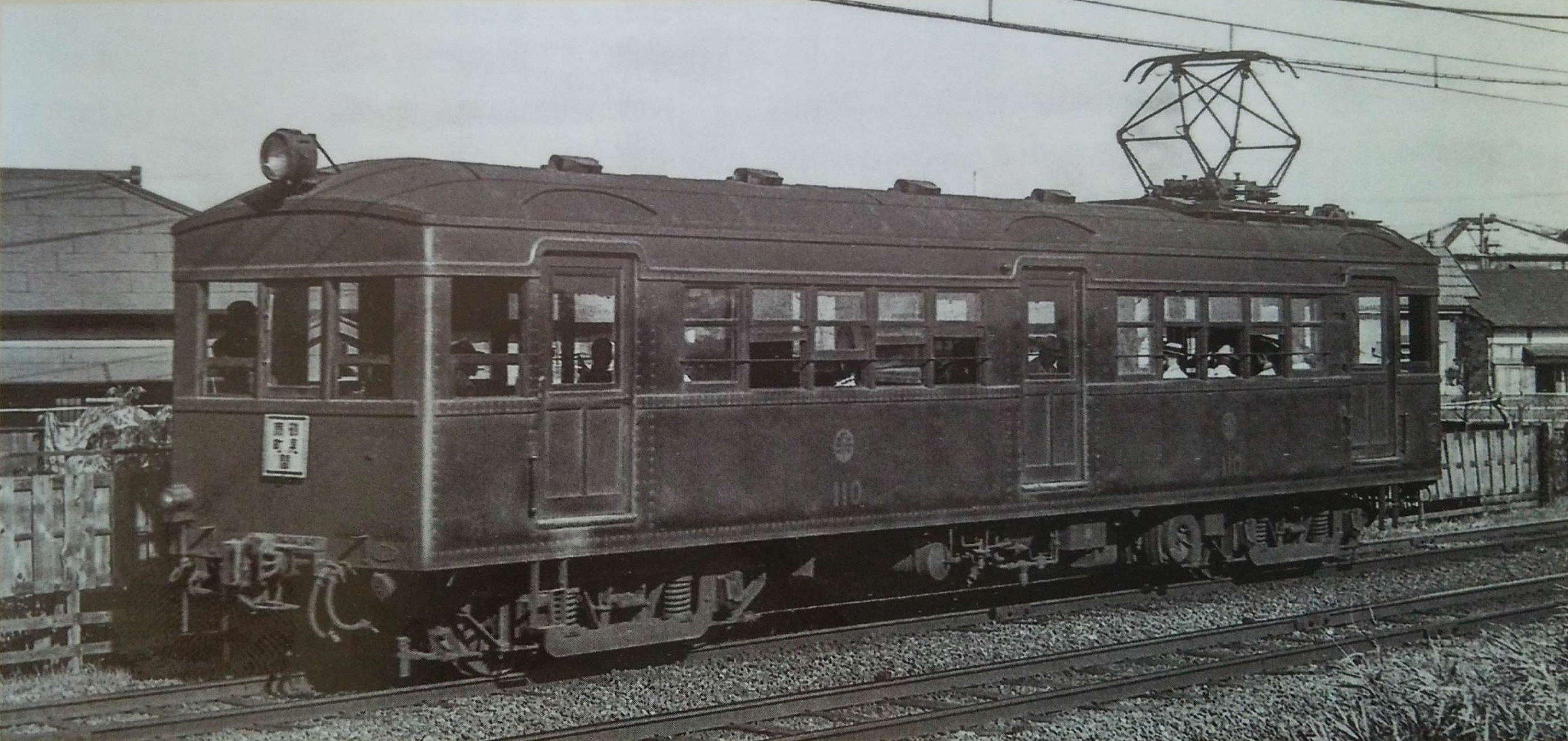
Tsurumi Rinko Railway MoHa 110 electric car number MoHa 110 in August 1939
