= Ōgimachi Station (Kanagawa) =

Railway station in Kawasaki, Kanagawa Prefecture, Japan

JI10 Ōgimachi Station 扇町駅
- Ōgimachi Station

General information
- Location: 4-5 Ōgimachi, Kawasaki-ku, Kawasaki-shi, Kanagawa-ken 210-0867; Japan
- Coordinates: 35°30′6.27″N 139°43′20.8″E
- Operator: JR East; JR Freight
- Line: Tsurumi Line
- Distance: 7.0 km from Tsurumi
- Platforms: 1 side platform

Other information
- Station code: JI10
- Website: Official website

History
- Opened: 28 October 1930; 95 years ago

Passengers
- 611 daily

Services
Preceding station	JR East	Following station
Shōwa JI09 towards Tsurumi	Tsurumi Line Main Line	Terminus
Location
- Location within Kanagawa Prefecture Location within Japan

Ōgimachi Station (扇町駅, Ōgimachi-eki) is a passenger railway station located in Kawasaki-ku, Kawasaki, Kanagawa Prefecture, Japan, operated by East Japan Railway Company (JR East). It is also a freight depot for the Japan Freight Railway Company (JR Freight).

== Lines ==
Ōgimachi Station is the eastern terminus of the Tsurumi Line, and is 7.0 kilometers (4.3 mi) from the western terminus at Tsurumi Station.

== Station layout ==
The station consists of a single side platform serving bi-directional traffic. The station is unattended.

=== Platforms ===
/	Tsurumi Line	for Hama-Kawasaki, Asano, Bentembashi, and Tsurumi

== History ==
Ōgimachi Station was opened on 20 July 1924 as a station on the privately held Tsurumi Rinkō Railway (鶴見臨港鉄道, Tsurumi Rinkō Tetsudō) initially for freight operations only. Passenger services were started from 28 October 1930. The line was nationalized on 1 July 1943 and was absorbed into the Japanese Government Railways network. The station has been unstaffed since 1 March 1971. Upon the privatization of the Japanese National Railways (JNR) on 1 April 1987 the station has been jointly operated by JR East and Japan Freight Railway Company.

== Passenger statistics ==
In fiscal 2008, the station was used by an average of 611 passengers daily (boarding passengers only).

== Surrounding area ==
- Showa Showa Denko Gas Products Kawasaki Factory
- Mitsui Wharf
- JXTG Energy Kawasaki Plant (formerly Mitsubishi Oil Kawasaki Refinery)
- Kawasaki Natural Gas Power Generation Kawasaki Natural Gas Power Generation
- JR East Kawasaki Thermal Power Station

== See also ==
- List of railway stations in Japan
