= Umi-Shibaura Station =

Railway station in Yokohama, Japan

Coordinates: 35°29′9.7″N 139°42′2.7″E

JI52 Umi-Shibaura Station 海芝浦駅
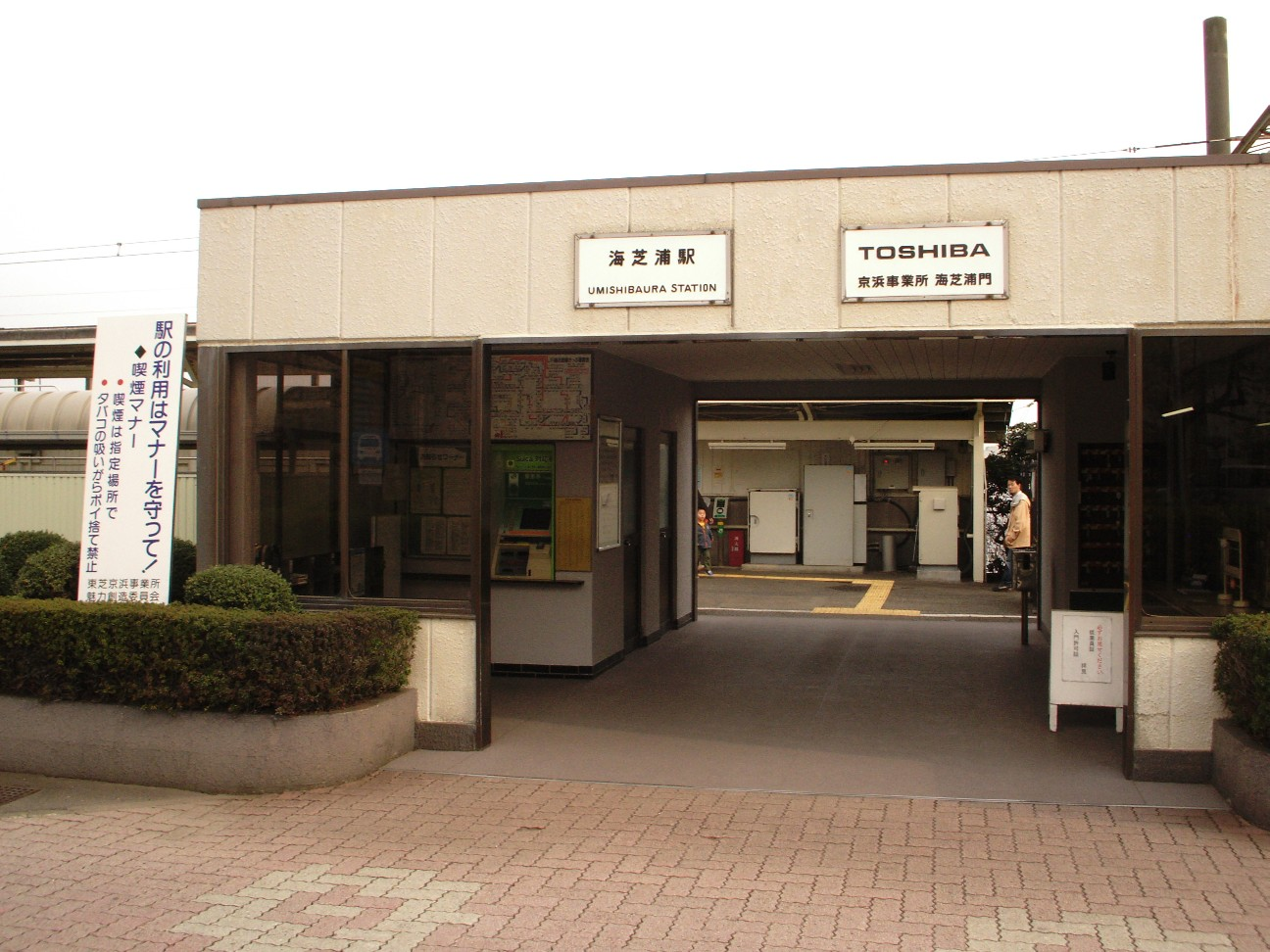
- Umi-Shibaura Station viewed from the Toshiba premises, April 2007

General information
- Location: 2 Suehiro-chō, Tsurumi Ward, Yokohama City, Kanagawa Prefecture; Japan
- Operator: JR East
- Line: Tsurumi Line
- Platforms: 1 side platform
- Tracks: 1

Construction
- Structure type: At grade

History
- Opened: 1 November 1940; 85 years ago

Services
Preceding station	JR East	Following station
Shin-Shibaura JI51 towards Tsurumi	Tsurumi Line Umi-Shibaura branch	Terminus
Location
- Location within Yokohama Location within Tokyo Bay and Bōsō Peninsula Location within Kanagawa Prefecture Location within Kanto Area Location within Japan

Umi-Shibaura Station (海芝浦駅, Umi-shibaura-eki) is a railway station on the Tsurumi Line in Tsurumi-ku, Yokohama, Kanagawa Prefecture, Japan, operated by East Japan Railway Company (JR East). The station is located on the grounds of Toshiba's Keihin Product Operations, and the only exit from the station is into the company's grounds. As a result, only Toshiba employees with valid employee ID cards and invited visitors are permitted to exit the station. A small park next to the station is open for public use; however there is no pedestrian exit from the station or park and anyone other than authorised Toshiba employees or visitors must exit by using a train.

== Lines ==
Umi-Shibaura station is the terminus of the Umi-Shibaura branch of the Tsurumi Line and lies 4.7 km (2.9 mi) from the terminus at Tsurumi Station.

== Services ==
Trains operate frequently during weekday morning and afternoon peak periods, but at other times there are gaps of up to 1½ hours between trains.

== Station layout ==
A single side platform, located on the waterfront of Tokyo Bay, for both inbound and outbound trains. The exit is located opposite the buffer stop, with pole-mounted Entry and Exit IC Card readers and a boarding certificate issuing machine. There are no ticket gates or ticket vending machine.

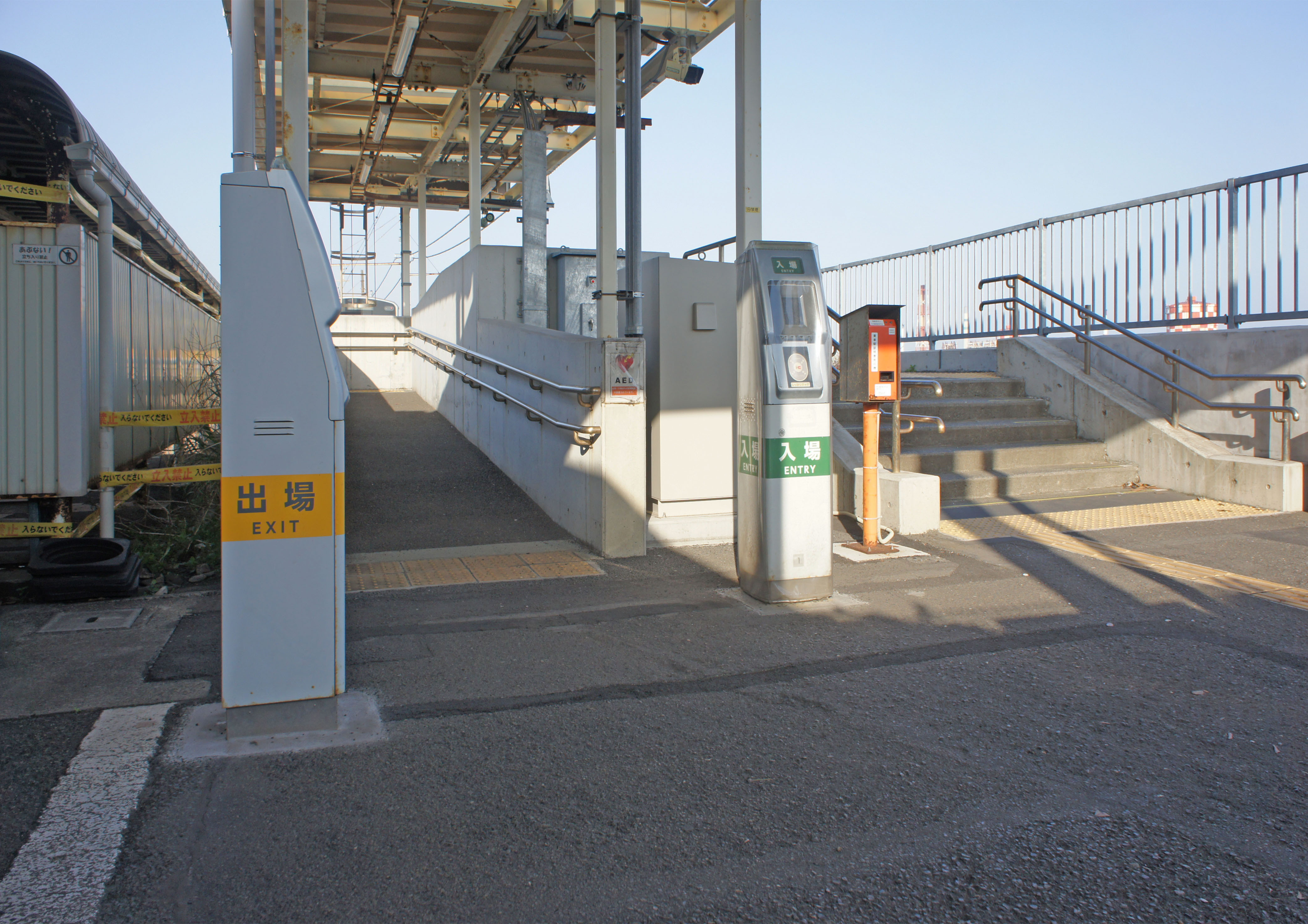
Entry & Exit IC Card readers and boarding certificate issuing machine, April 2022

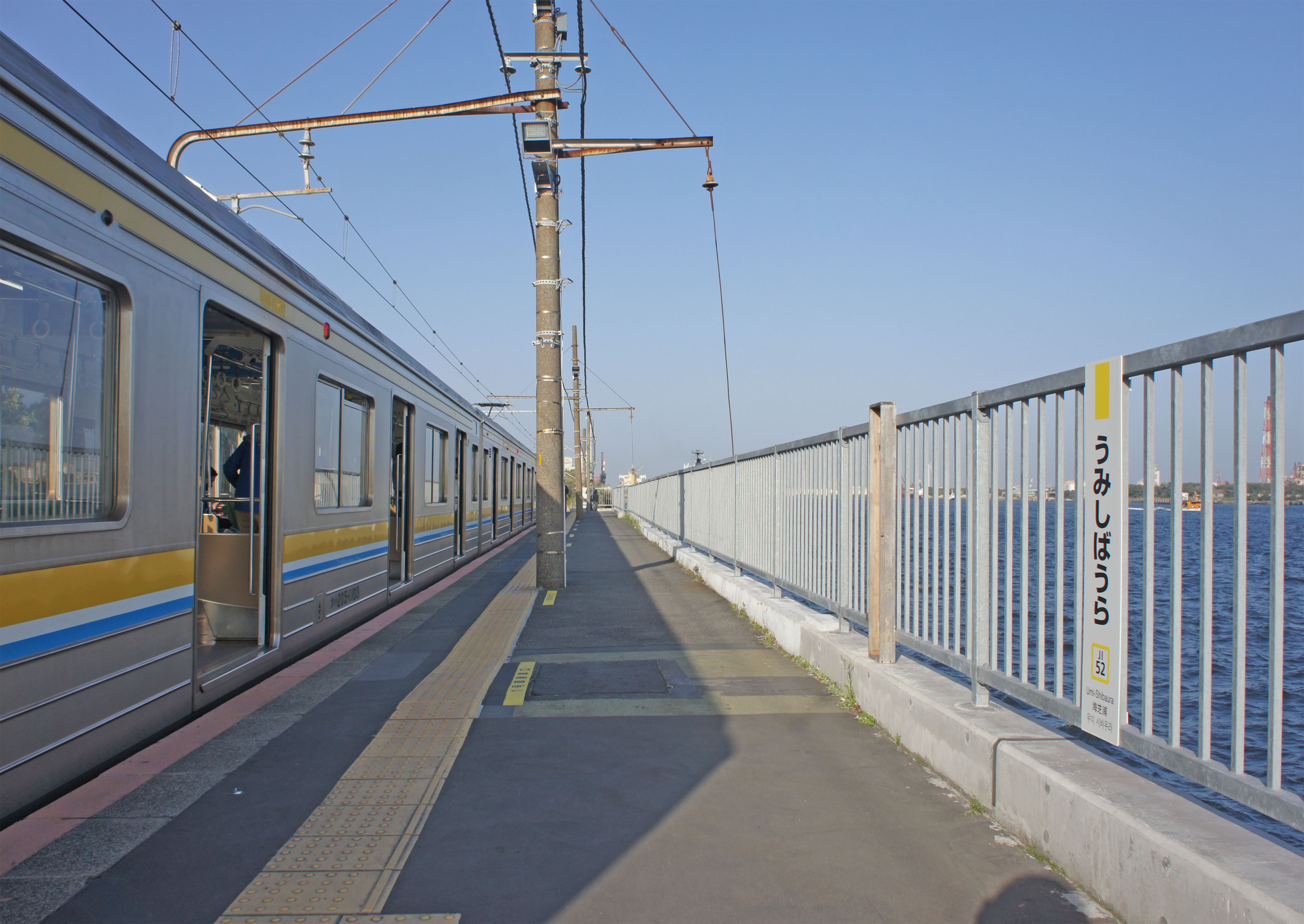
Platforms, April 2022

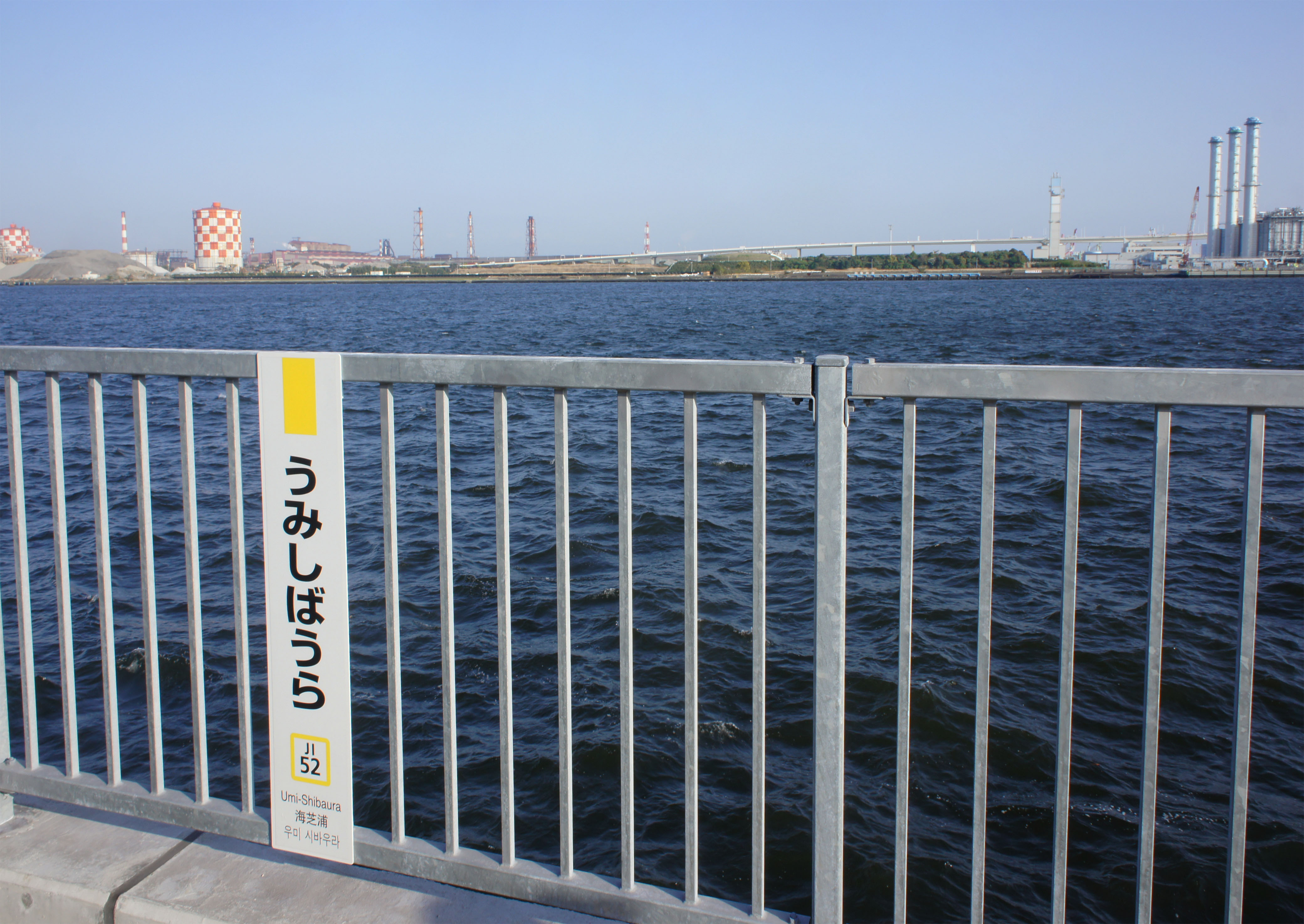
View of the Keihin Canal, April 2022

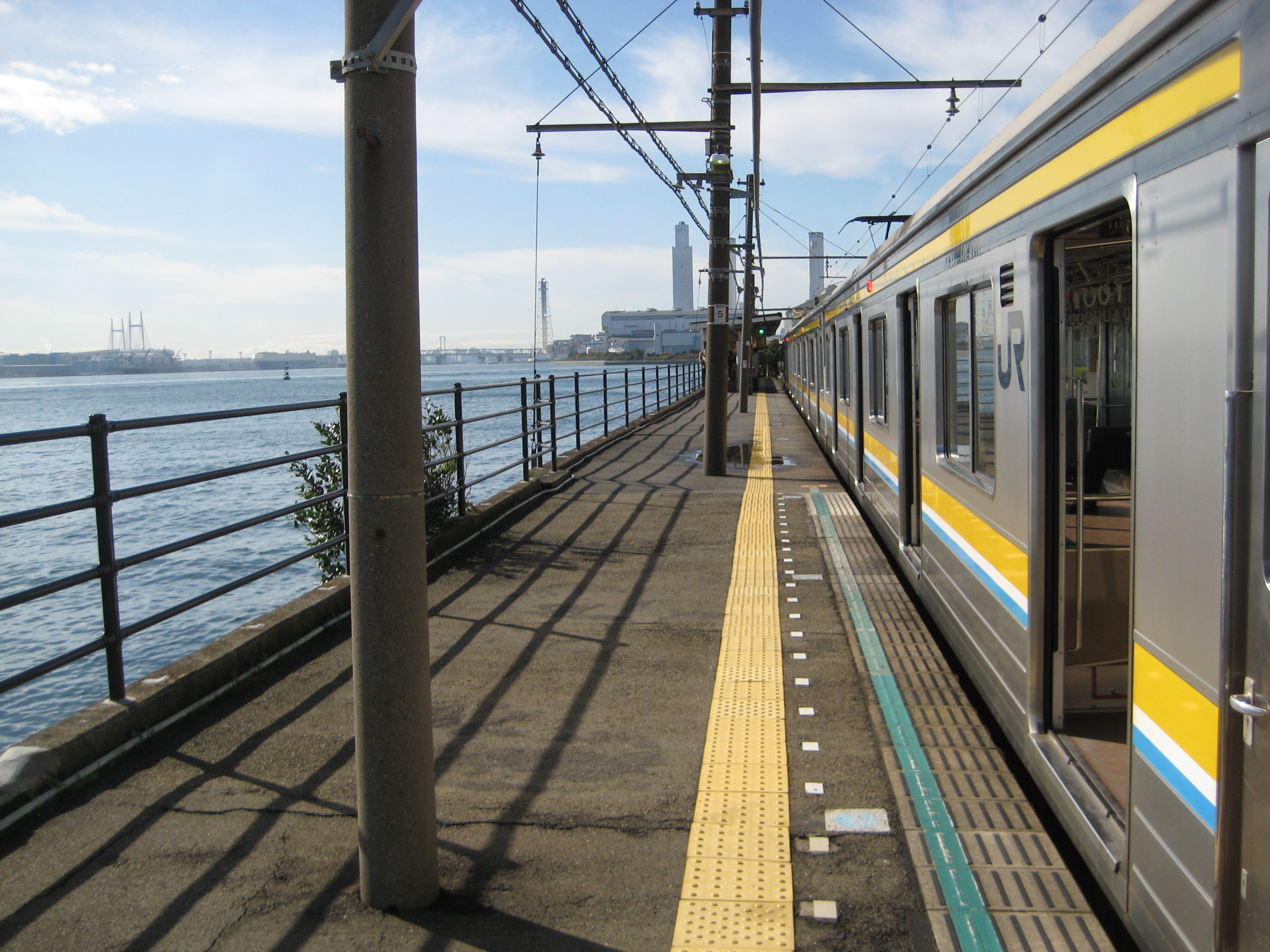
View of the platform and adjacent Tokyo Bay, December 2009

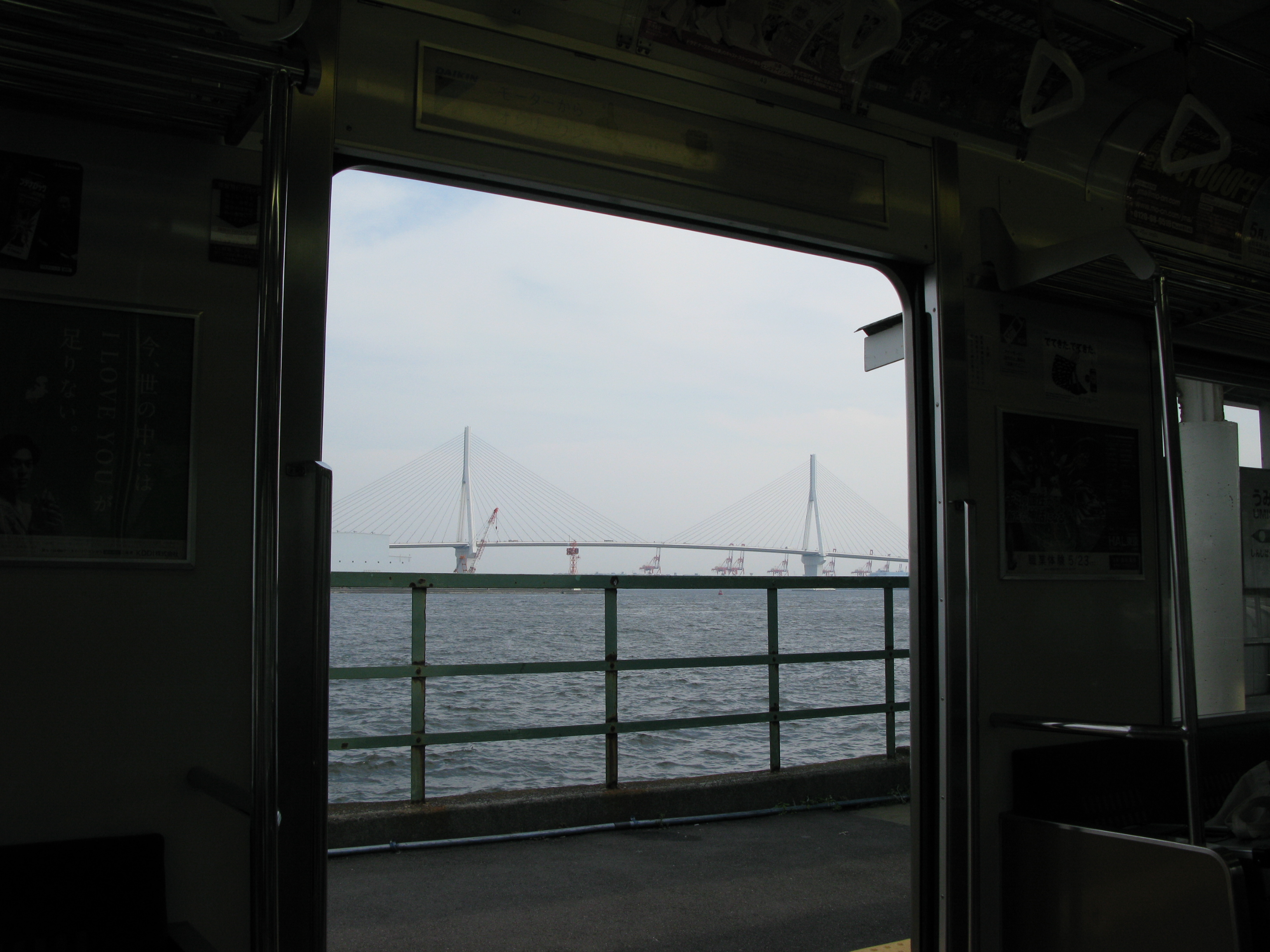
View of the Tsurumi Tsubasa Bridge from the station platform, May 2009

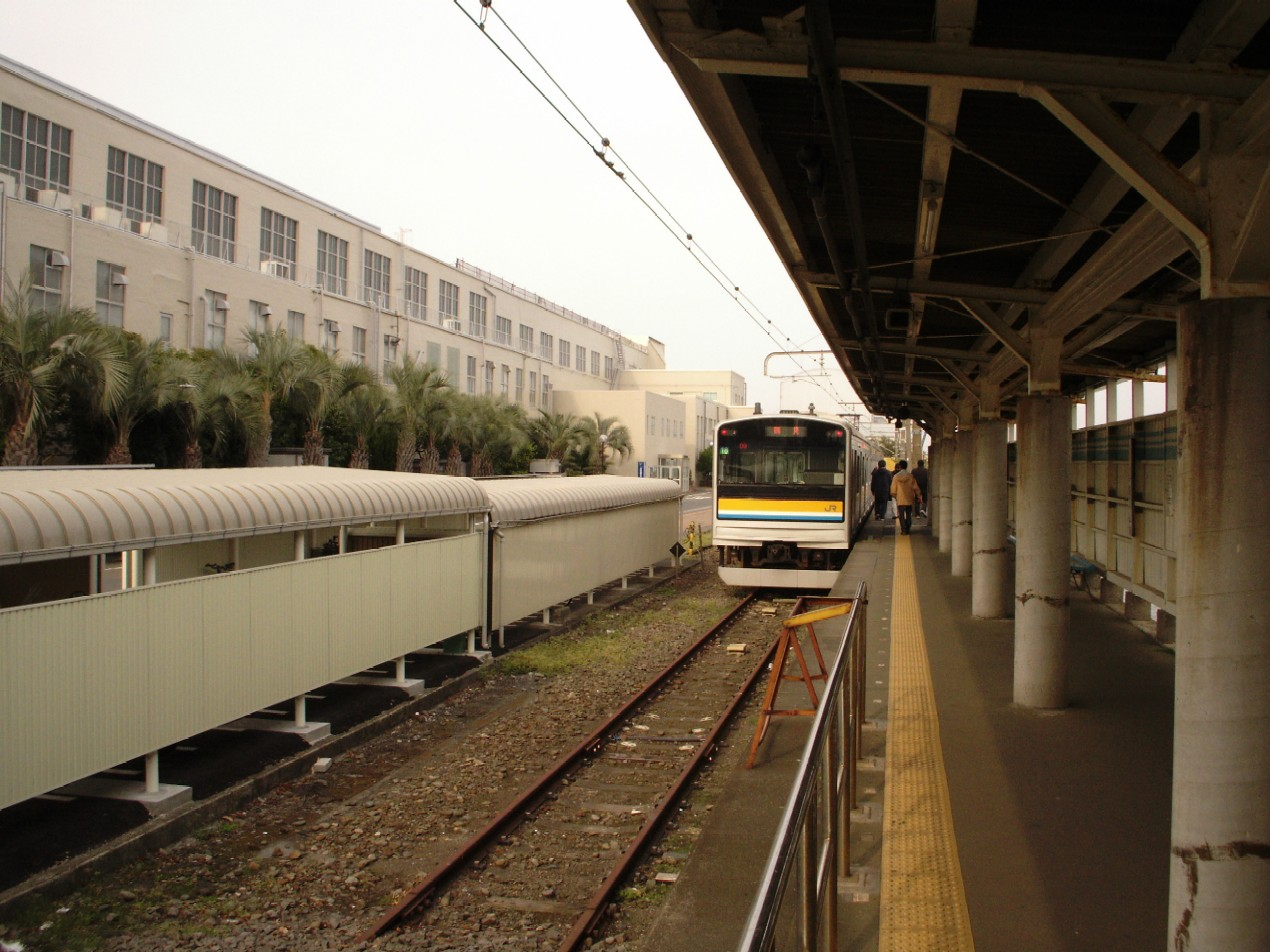
View of the platform, April 2007

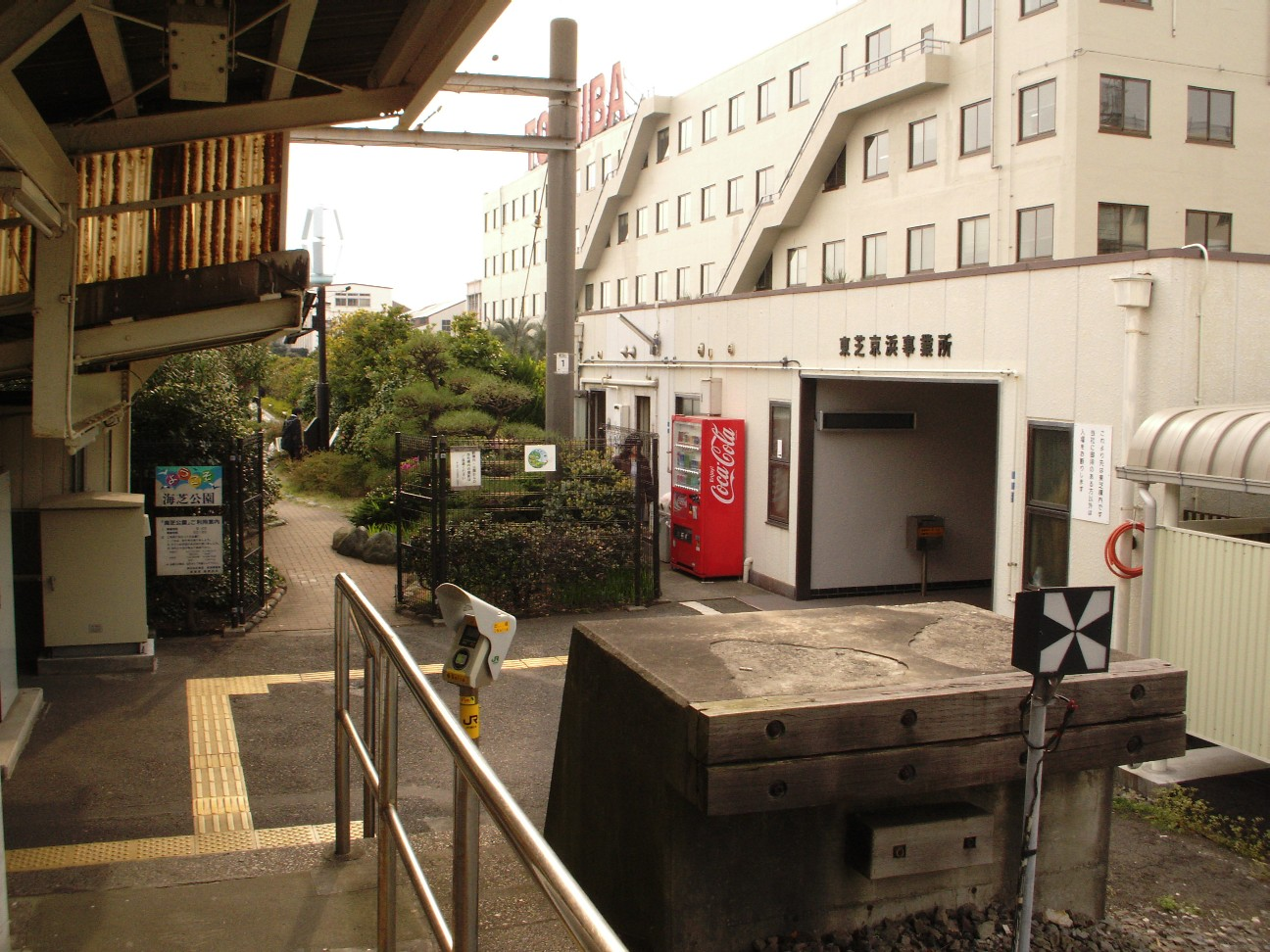
The station exit, Toshiba plant entrance, and Shibaura Park, April 2007

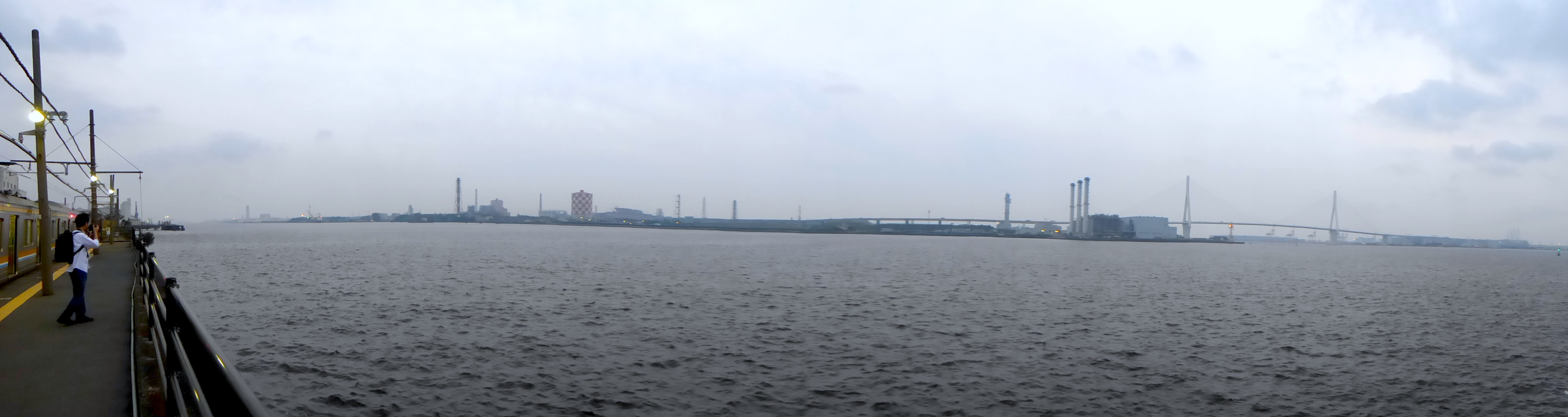
Panorama of the view from the platform, June 2015

=== Platform ===
1	Tsurumi Line (Umi-Shibaura Branch)	for Asano and Tsurumi

== Service ==
Umi-Shibaura is served hourly during off-peak times (midday, night and weekends), with more frequent services during morning and evening rush hours.

== History ==
Umi-Shibaura Station was opened on 1 November 1940 as a station on a spur line of the privately held Tsurumi Rinkō Railway (鶴見臨港鉄道, Tsurumi Rinkō Tetsudō). The Tsurumi Rinkō line was nationalized on 1 July 1943, and was later absorbed into the Japanese National Railways (JNR) network. The station has been unstaffed since 1 March 1971, although the adjacent Toshiba guardhouse is staffed 24 hours a day. Following the privatization of JNR on 1 April 1987, the station was transferred to operation by JR East. In 2000, Umi-Shibaura Station was selected as one of the top 100 stations in the Kantō region by a public poll conducted by the Ministry of Land, Infrastructure, Transport and Tourism.

== Surrounding area ==
Toshiba owns the land beneath the station and the surrounding portion of the Tsurumi Line, and JR East operates both under a long-term lease. Because of the surrounding scenery, and its status as "the station which you can never leave", Umi-Shibaura has been featured in several books and television programs and has gained some popularity as a day-trip destination. Toshiba has catered to these tourists by constructing a small park (Umishiba Park) within the station for employees and waiting passengers; it is open to the public (during business hours) and has a sweeping view of Tokyo Bay.
