= Ōkawa Station =

Railway station in Kawasaki, Kanagawa Prefecture, Japan

JI61 Ōkawa Station 大川駅
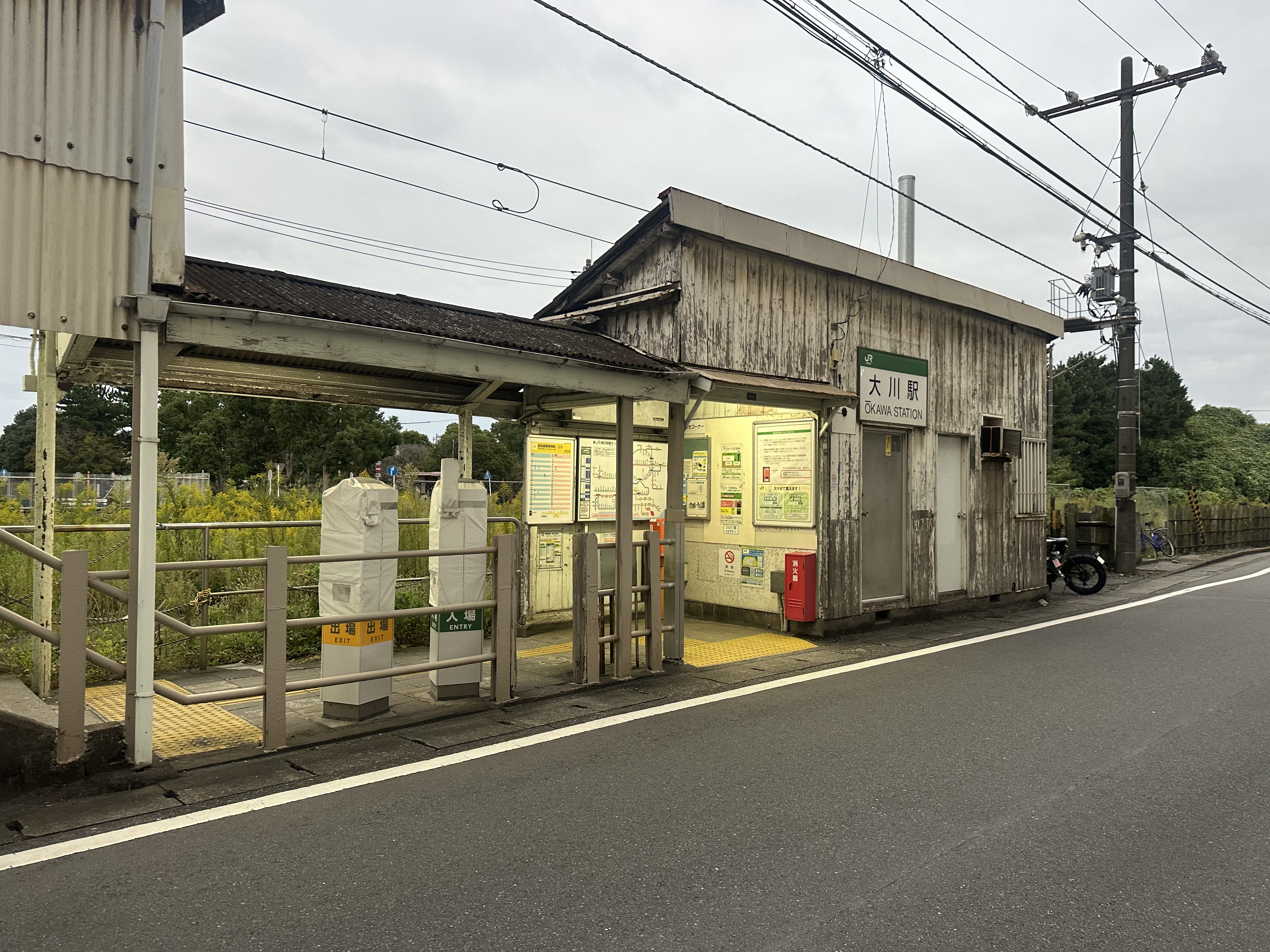
- Ōkawa Station in October 2025

General information
- Location: Ōkawa-chō, Kawasaki-ku, Kawasaki-shi, Kanagawa-ken 210-0858; Japan
- Coordinates: 35°29′43.6″N 139°42′41″E
- Operator: JR East; JR Freight
- Line: Tsurumi Line
- Distance: 5.1 km from Tsurumi
- Platforms: 1 side platform

Other information
- Station code: JI61
- Website: Official website

History
- Opened: 10 March 1926

Passengers
- 1009 daily

Services
Preceding station	JR East	Following station
Anzen JI06 towards Tsurumi	Tsurumi Line Ōkawa branch	Terminus
Location
- Location within Kanagawa Prefecture Location within Japan

Ōkawa Station (大川駅, Ōkawa-eki) is a passenger railway station located in Kawasaki-ku, Kawasaki, Kanagawa Prefecture, Japan, operated by East Japan Railway Company (JR East). It is also a freight depot for the Japan Freight Railway Company (JR Freight).

== Lines ==
Ōkawa Station is the terminus of the Ōkawa branch of the Tsurumi Line, and is 5.1 km from the western terminus of the line at Tsurumi Station. Services on the Ōkawa branch only run during peak hours.

== Station layout ==
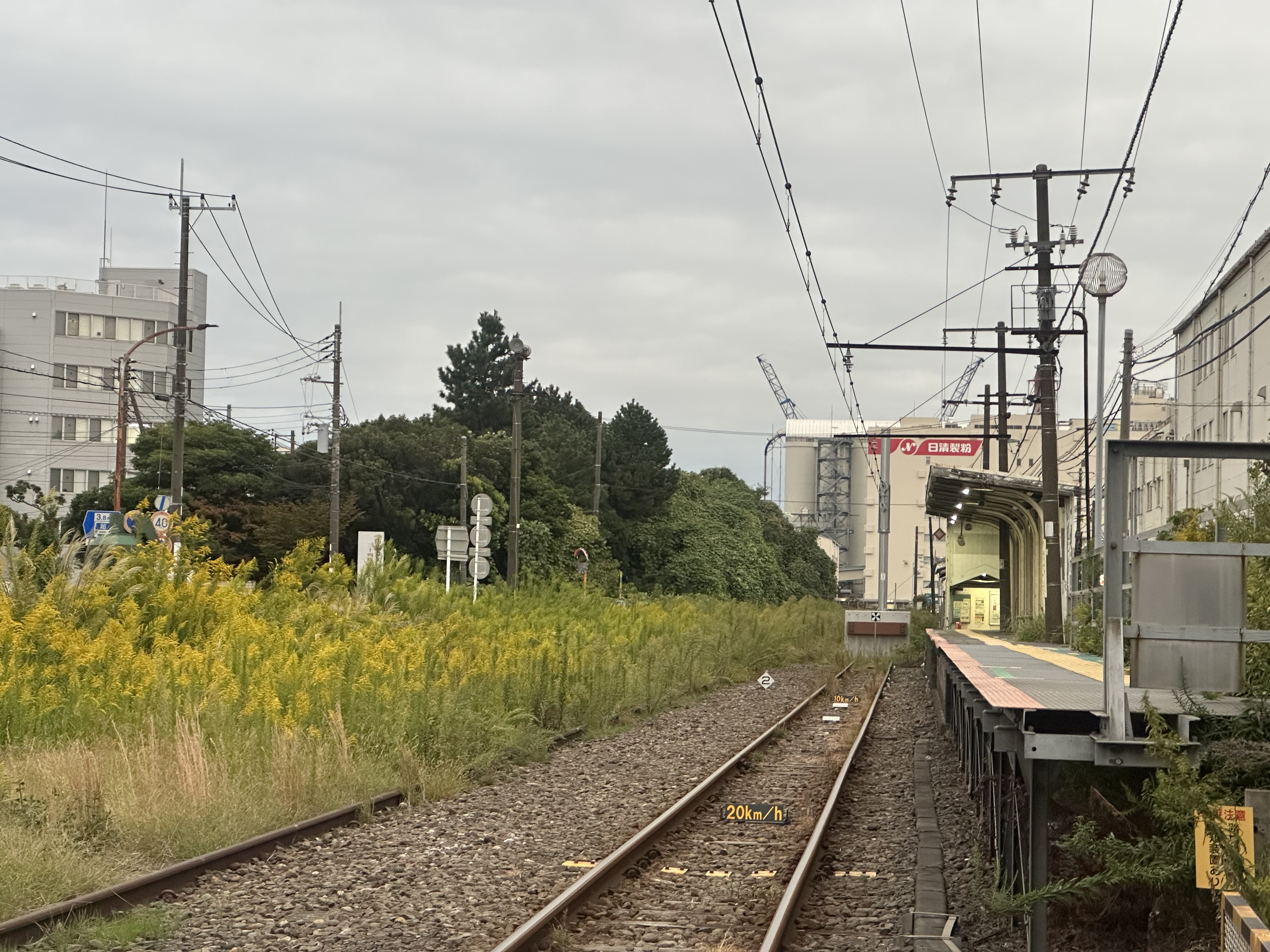
Ōkawa Station platform in October 2025

The station consists of a single side platform serving a single track for both inbound and outbound trains. The station is unattended.

=== Platforms ===
1	Tsurumi Line (Ōkawa Branch)	for Anzen, Bentembashi and Tsurumi

== History ==
Ōkawa Station opened on 10 March 1926, as a freight-handling station on the privately held Tsurumi Rinko Railway (鶴見臨港鉄道, Tsurumi Rinko Tetsudo). Passenger services started on October 28, 1930. The line was nationalized on July 1, 1943, and was later absorbed into the Japanese National Railways (JNR) network. The station has been unattended since March 1, 1971. With the privatization of JNR on April 1, 1987, the station came under the control of JR East.

== Surrounding area ==
- Nisshin Seifun Tsurumi Factory
- Showa Denko Kawasaki Office
- Mitsubishi Kakoki Headquarters, Kawasaki Seisakusho
- Okawa Industrial Park

== See also ==
- List of railway stations in Japan
