= 101 series =

Japanese train type

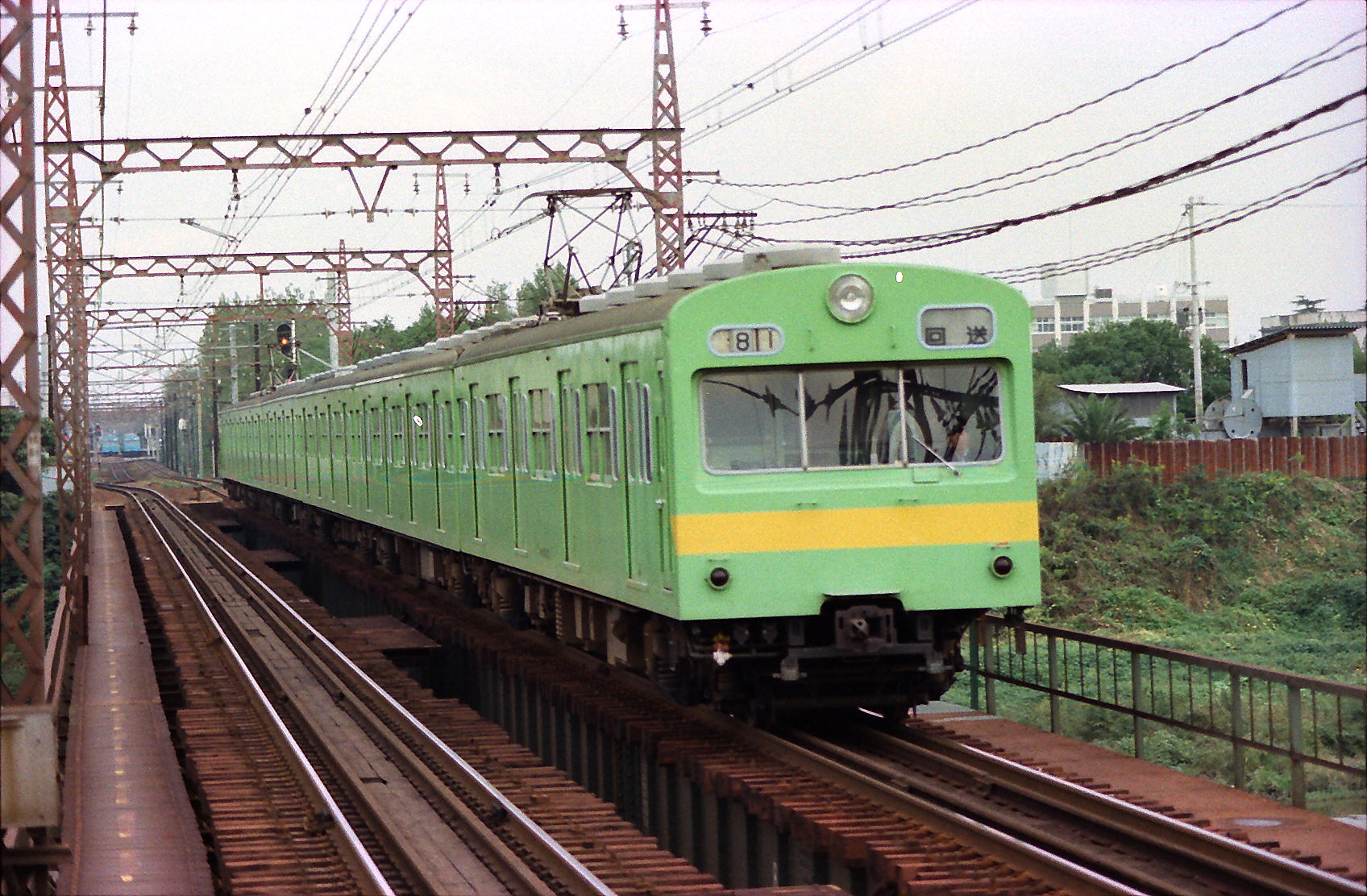
- JNR 6-car set at Asaka Station on the Hanwa Line, 1978
- In service: 16 December 1957 – 28 November 2003
- Manufacturers: Kawasaki Heavy Industries, Nippon Sharyo, Kisha Seizo, Tokyu Car Corporation
- Replaced: 72 series
- Constructed: 1957–1969
- Entered service: December 1957
- Scrapped: 1987–2014 (not all parts are fully scrapped, other remaining parts such as pantographs are still in use in other rolling stocks such as 121 series/7200 series & remodeled 145 series converted from old 101 series EMUs)
- Number built: 1,535 vehicles
- Number in service: None (44 vehicles being converted into 145 series multiple locomotive)
- Number preserved: 2 vehicles
- Number scrapped: 1,489 vehicles
- Successor: 103 series, 205 series, 207 series
- Formation: 2, 3, 6, 7, 8 or 10 cars per trainset
- Operators: JNR (1957–1987); JR East (1987–2003); JR-West (1987–1992); Chichibu Railway (1986–2014)

Specifications
- Car body construction: Steel
- Car length: 20,000 mm (65 ft 7 in)
- Width: 2,879 mm (9 ft 5.3 in)
- Doors: 4 pairs per side
- Maximum speed: 100 km/h (62 mph)
- Traction system: Resistor control
- Traction motors: MT46
- Power output: 100 kW (134 hp)
- Acceleration: 2.0 km/(h⋅s) (1.2 mph/s) (7-car formation); 3.2 km/(h⋅s) (2.0 mph/s) (all motored cars)
- Deceleration: 3.0 km/(h⋅s) (1.9 mph/s) (service, 7-car set); 3.5 km/(h⋅s) (2.2 mph/s) (emergency)
- Electric system: 1,500 V DC overhead catenary
- Current collection: Pantograph
- Bogies: DT21, DT21T, TR64
- Track gauge: 1,067 mm (3 ft 6 in)

The 101 series (101系, 101-kei) was a DC electric multiple unit (EMU) commuter train type introduced in 1957 by Japanese National Railways (JNR), and formerly operated by East Japan Railway Company (JR East) and West Japan Railway Company (JR-West). The last remaining trains were withdrawn in November 2003.

== History ==
The prototype 101 series set was delivered in June 1957, as a 10-car (4+6-car) set classified as 90 series with all cars motored. Cab cars were numbered MoHa 90500 to 90503, and the intermediate cars were numbered MoHa 90000 to 90005. Production sets were delivered from March 1958, differing visually from the prototype in having exposed rain gutters along the top of each car. The 90 series was reclassified as 101 series from 1959, with the prototype set cars numbered in the 900 subseries. The prototype set was modified in 1962 to bring it up to production set standards.

== Lines used ==
101 series trains operated on the following lines.

=== Tokyo Area ===
- Chūō Line (Rapid) (1957-1985)
- Itsukaichi Line (1978-1985)
- Keihin-Tohoku Line (1970-1978)
- Musashino Line (1973-1986)
- Nambu Line (1969-1991 for commuter rail services; 1980 - November 2003 for Branch line services)
- Chūō-Sōbu Line (1963-1988)
- Tsurumi Line (1980-1992)
- Yamanote Line (1961-1968)
- Akabane Line (Now Saikyō Line) (1967-1978)

=== Osaka Area ===
- Kansai Main Line
- Katamachi Line (1976-1992)
- Osaka Loop Line (1964-1991)
- Sakurajima Line (1961-1991)
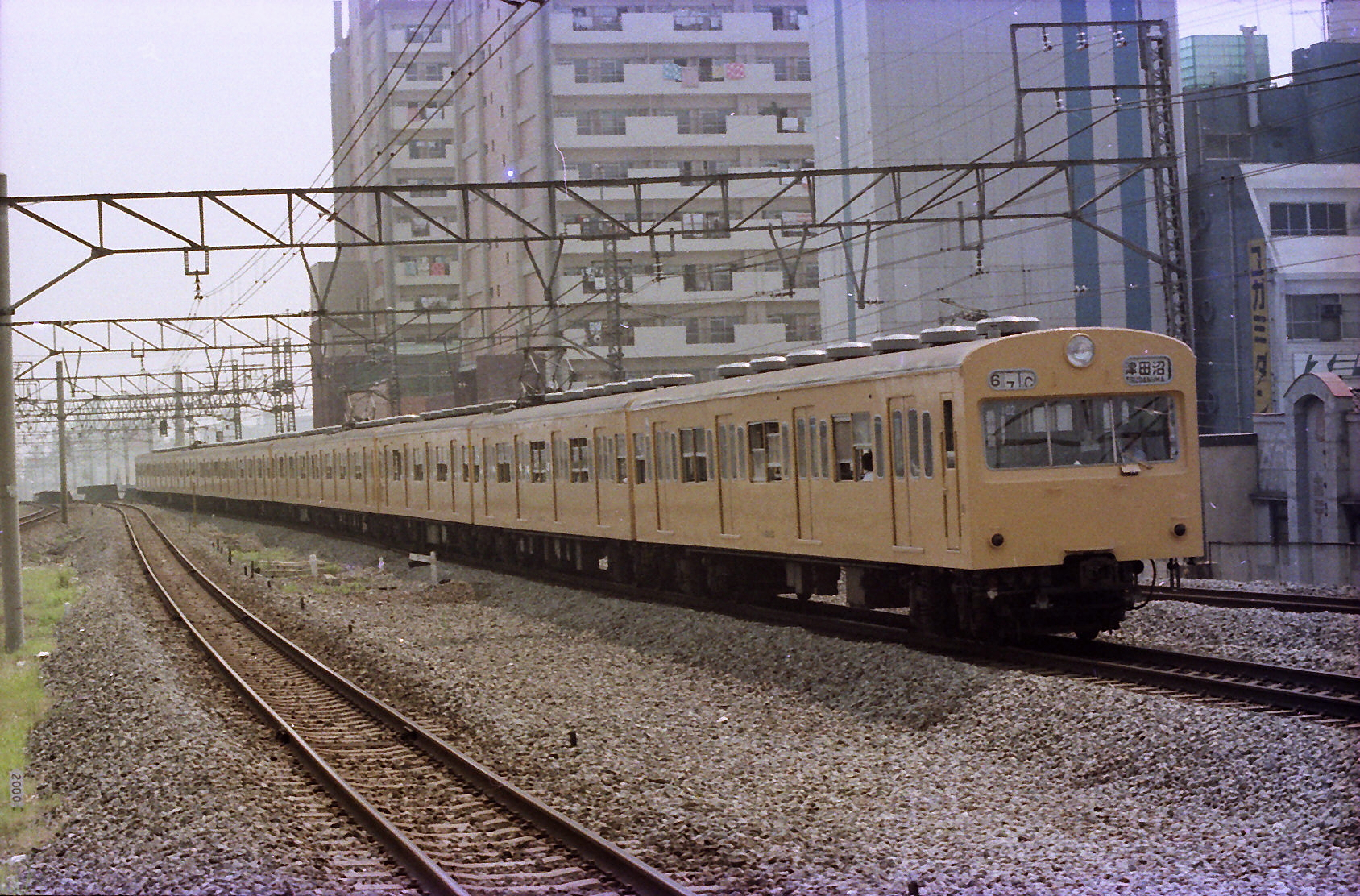
JNR 101 series EMU approaching Kinshicho Station at Chuo-Sobu Line, August 1978

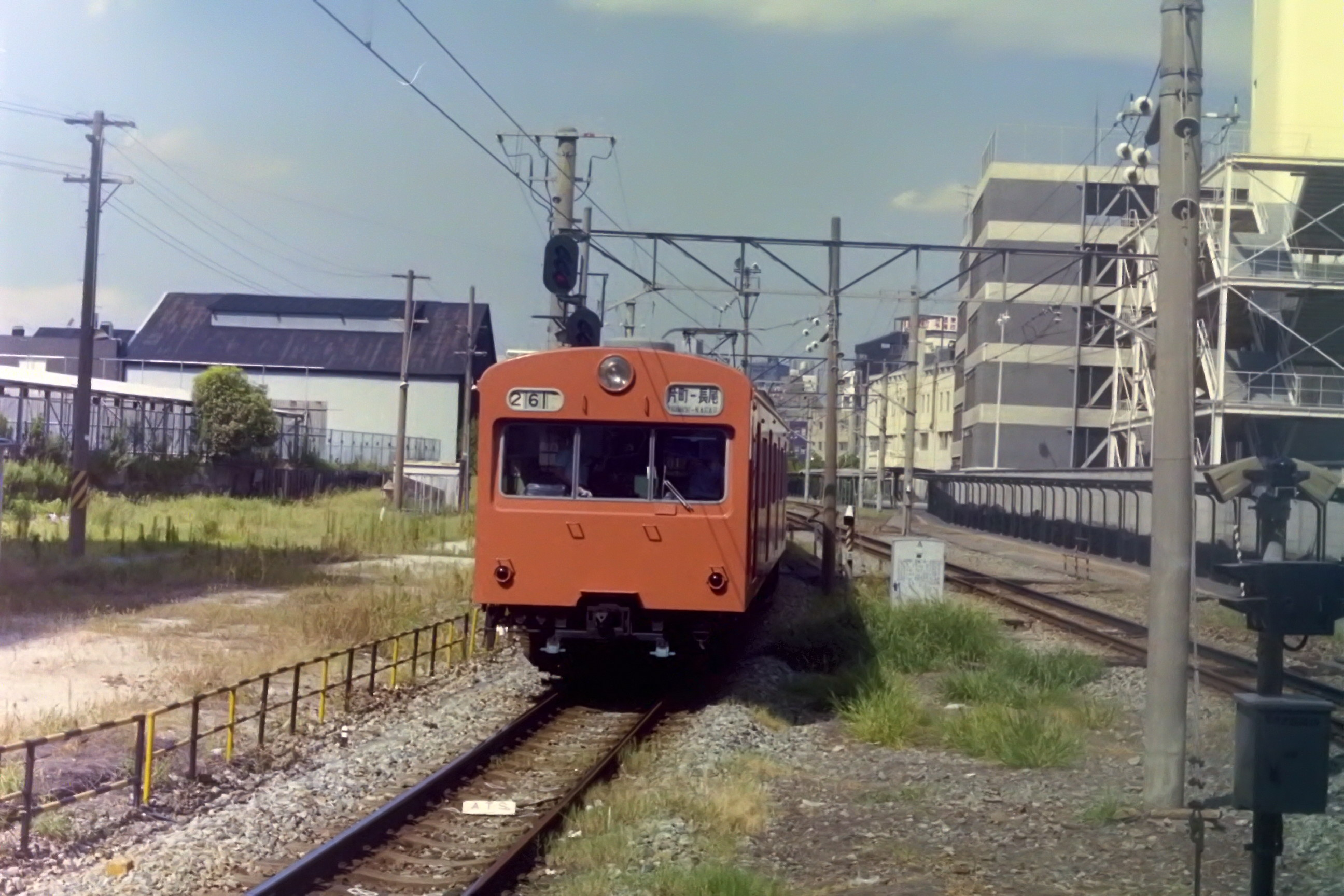
A JNR 101 series EMU leaving Katamachi Station on the Katamachi Line, 1985

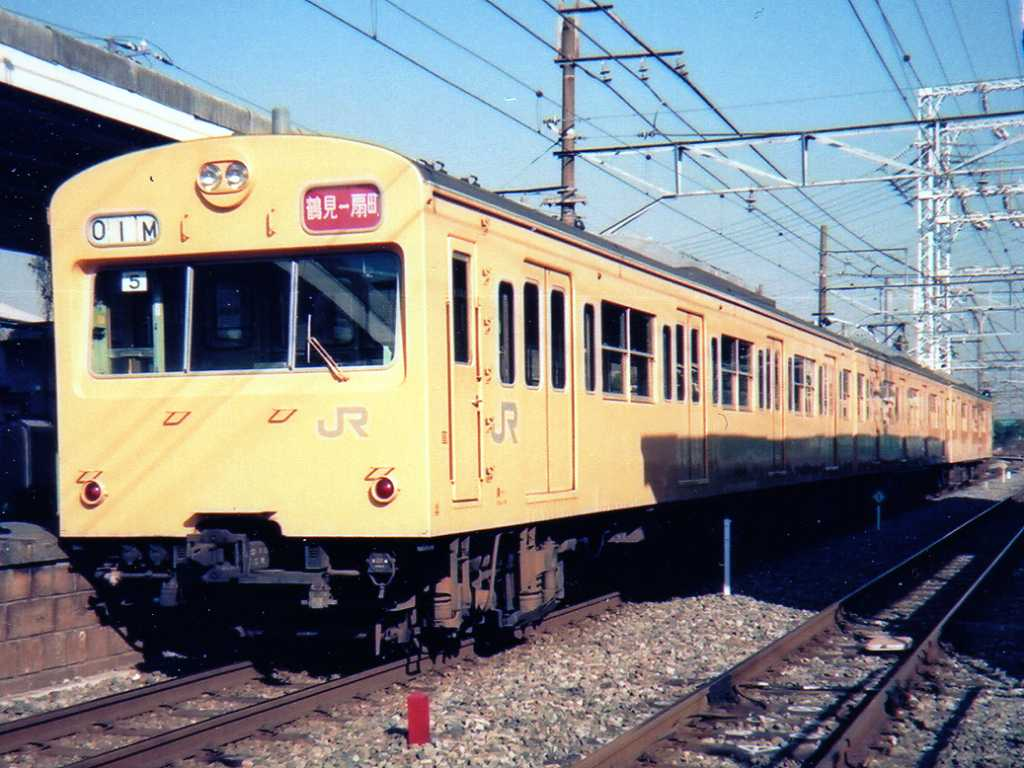
JR East 3-car Tsurumi Line set at Musashi-Shiraishi Station, circa December 1990

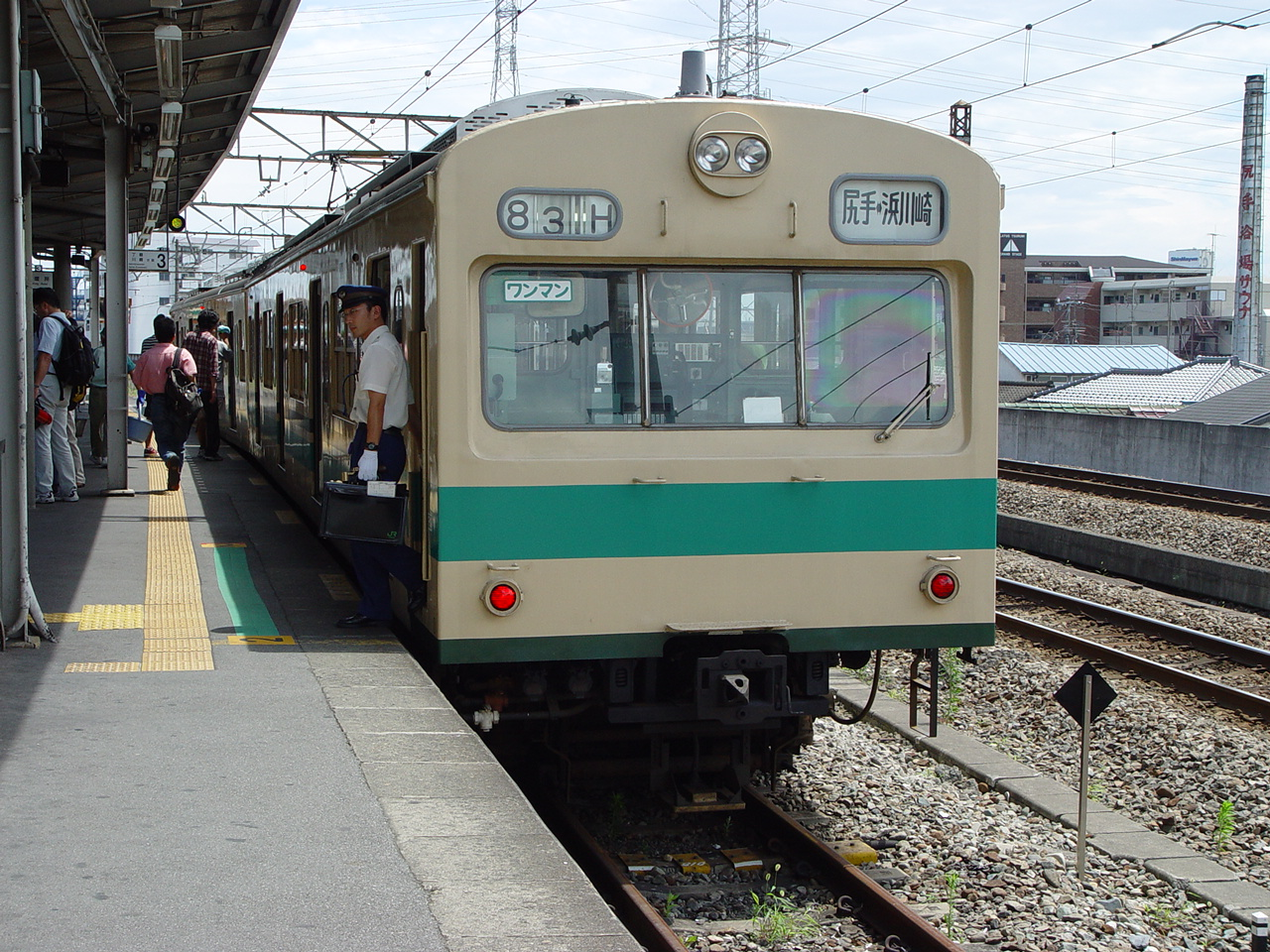
A JR East 2-car Nambu Branchline set at Shitte Station in July 2002

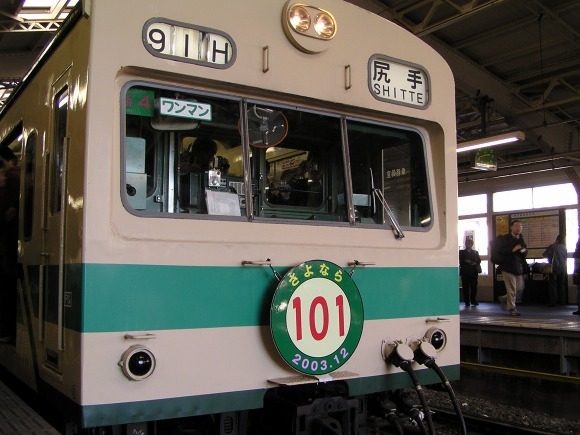
Last standing 101 series with "Sayonara" head mark on its last run on Nambu Branch Line Services in December 2003

== Private operators ==
A number of former 101 series trains were sold to the private railway operator Chichibu Railway in Saitama Prefecture in 1986, where they operated as 3-car 1000 series sets until March 2014.

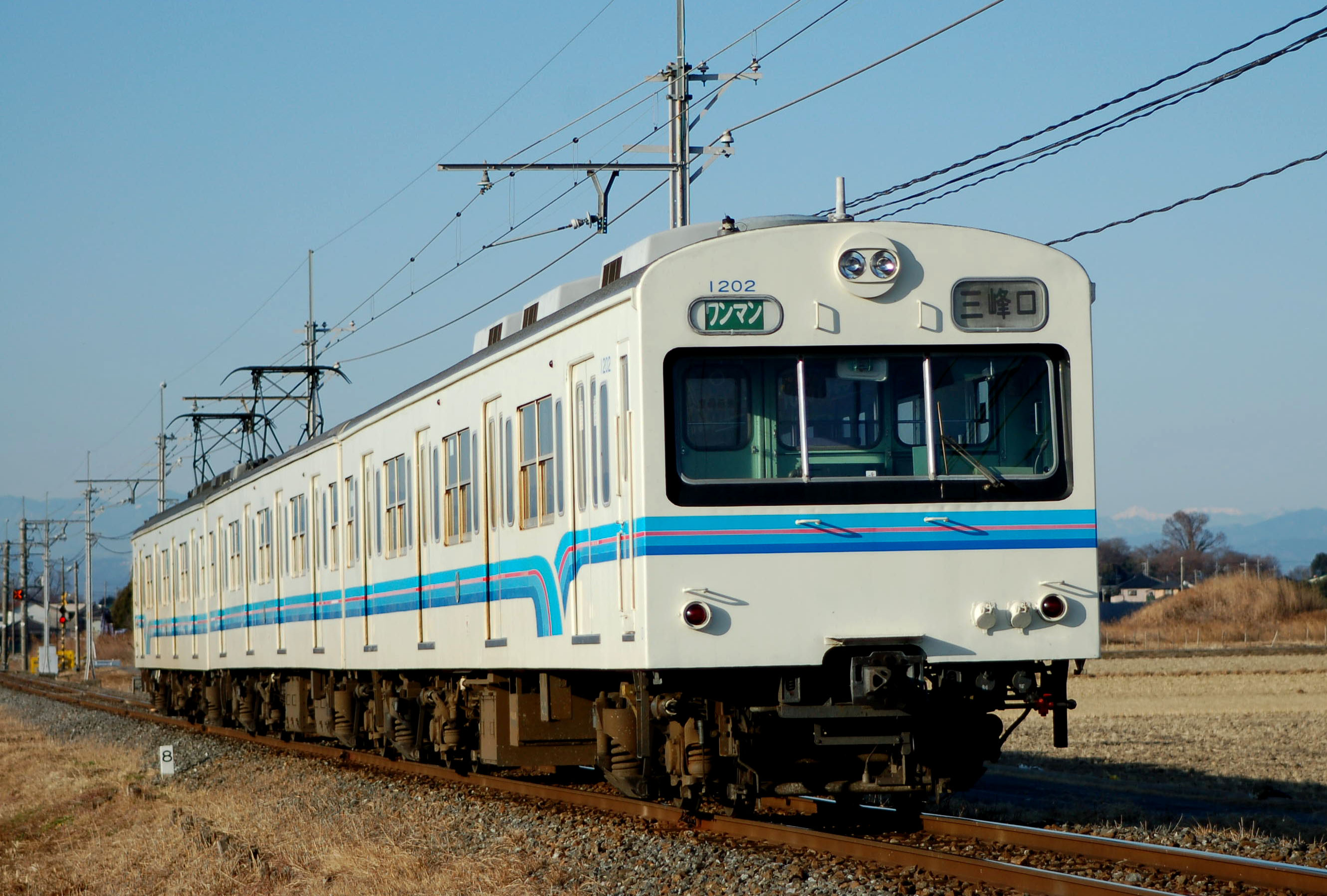
A Chichibu Railway 1000 series set in January 2008

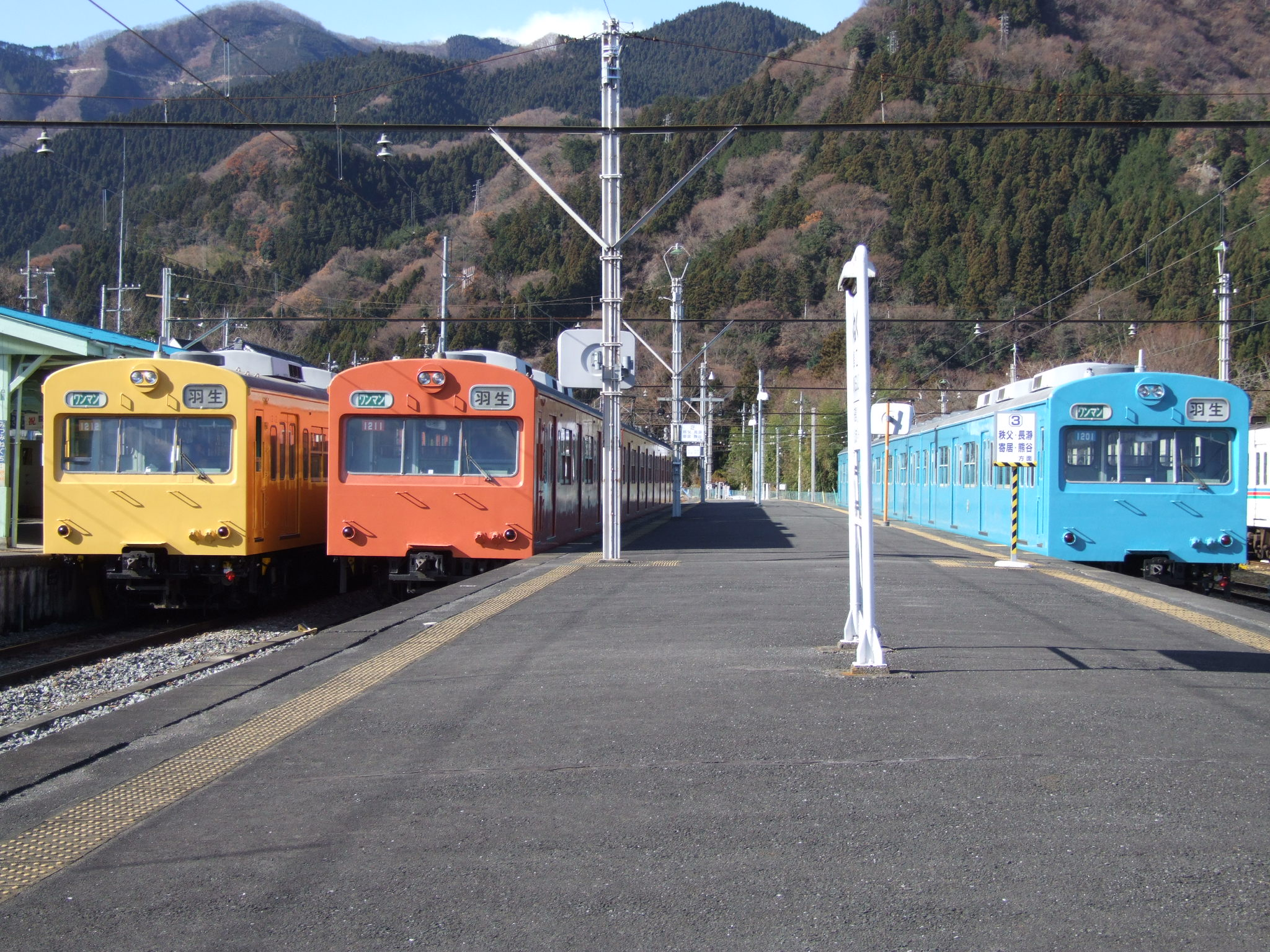
Chichibu Railway 1000 series sets in "revival" JNR liveries in December 2007

== Preserved examples ==
- KuMoHa 101-902 is preserved at The Railway Museum in Saitama, previously preserved at JR East's Tokyo General Rolling Stock Center.
- A 101 series mock-up car is exhibited at the Kyoto Railway Museum.
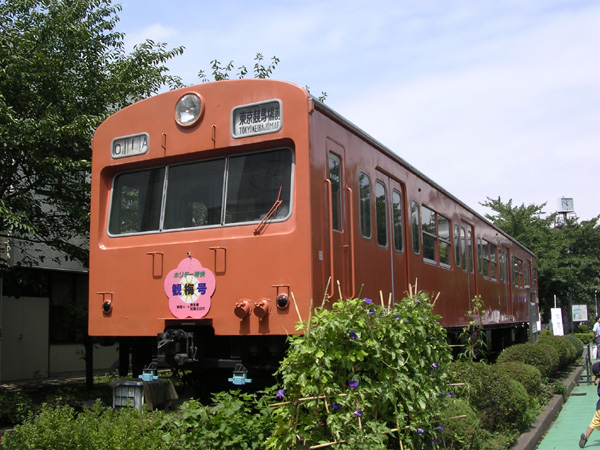
KuMoHa 101-902 at Tokyo General Rolling Stock Center, August 2005

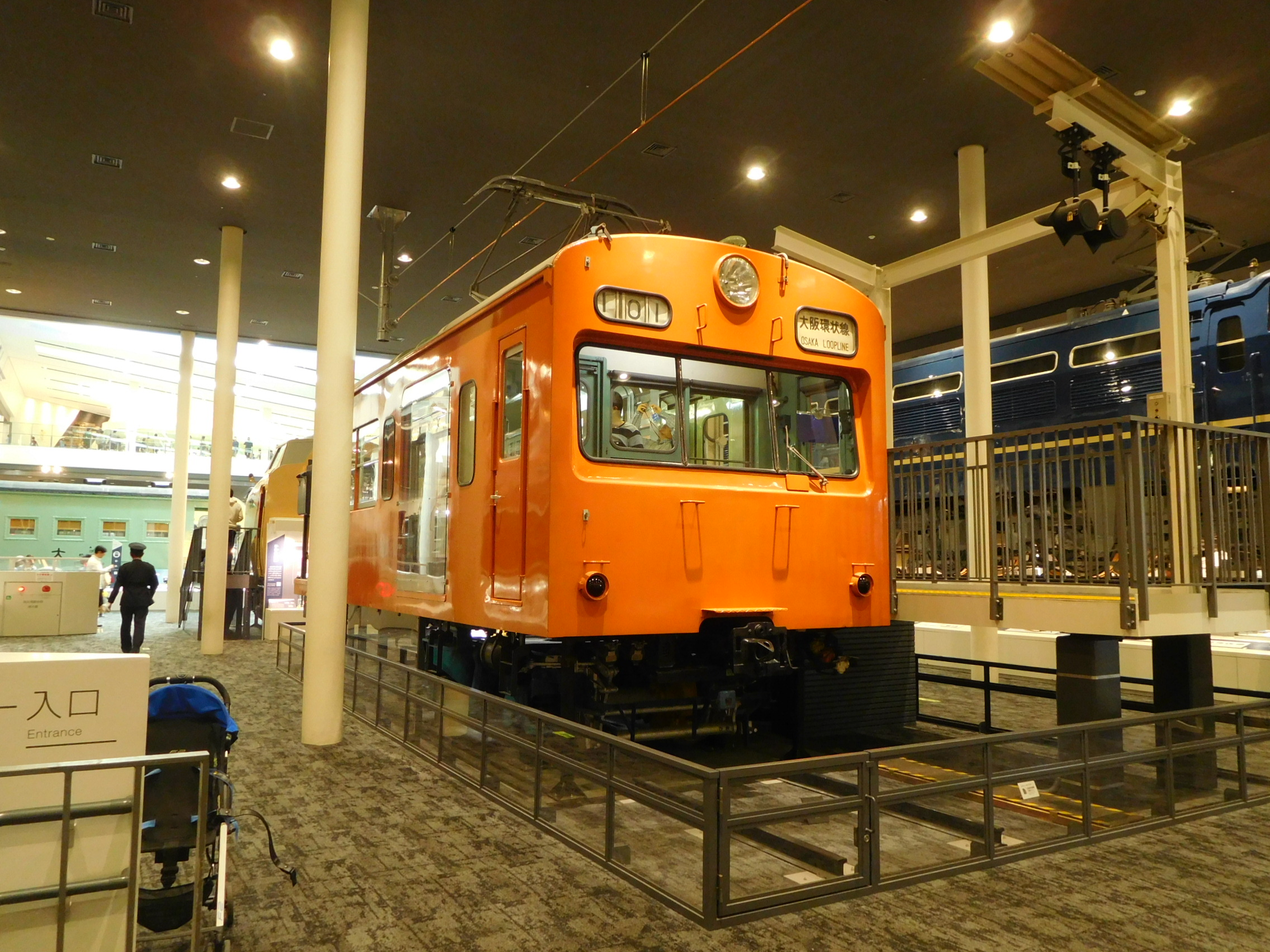
Mock-up of a 101 series at the Kyoto Railway Museum, April 2017
