= JR Shikoku 7000 series =

Japanese electric multiple unit train type

7000 series
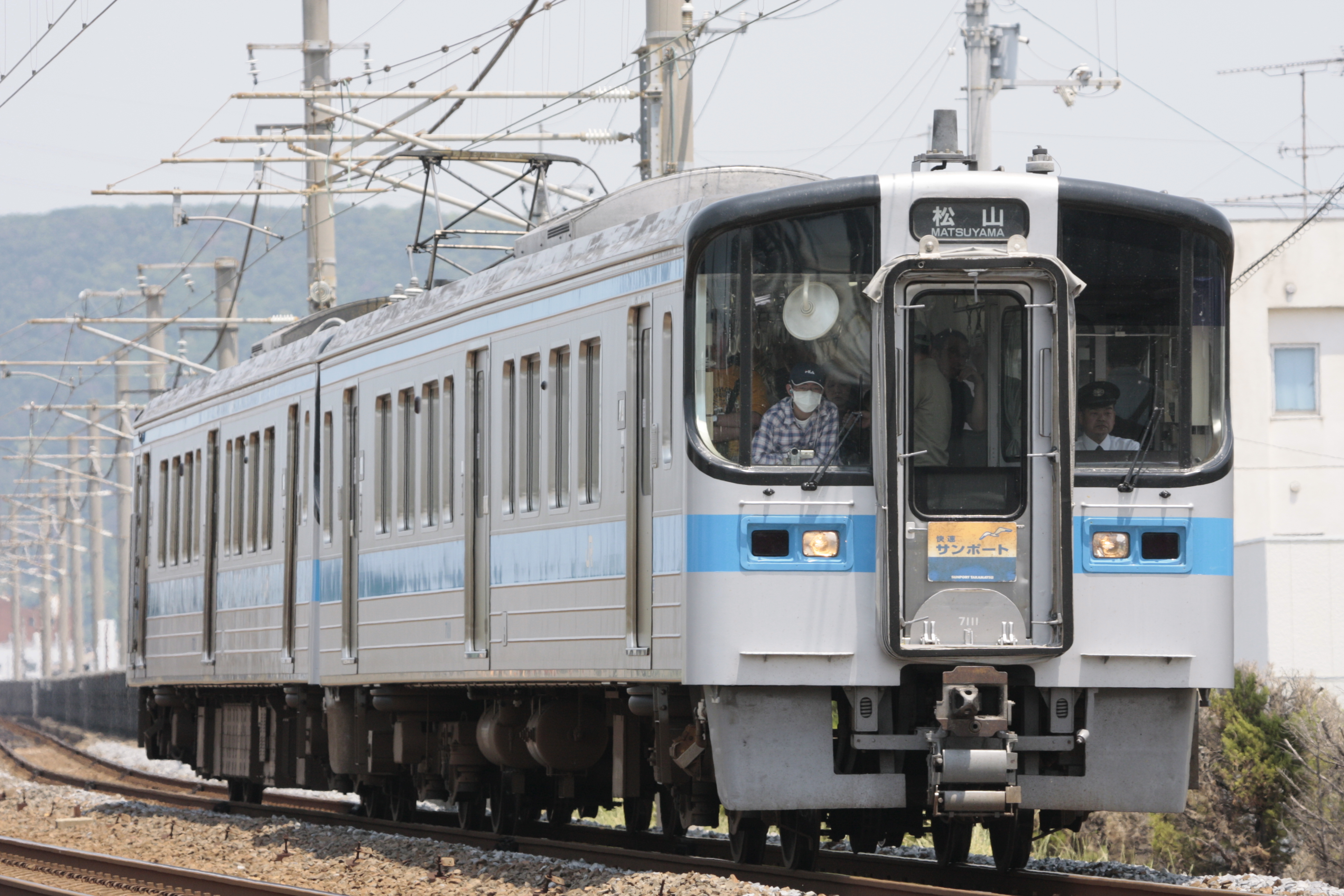
- 7000 series on a Sunport "Nampu" relay rapid service, May 2009
- In service: November 1990–
- Manufacturer: Kinki Sharyo
- Number built: 36 vehicles
- Number in service: 36 vehicles
- Formation: 1-3 cars per trainset
- Operator: JR Shikoku
- Depots: Takamatsu, Matsuyama
- Lines served: Dosan Line, Yosan Line

Specifications
- Car body construction: Stainless steel
- Car length: 21,300 mm (69 ft 11 in)
- Width: 2,870 mm (9 ft 5 in)
- Height: 3,570 mm (11 ft 9 in)
- Doors: 3 pairs per side
- Maximum speed: 110 km/h (70 mph)
- Traction system: S-MT58 × 4 (Variable frequency)
- Power output: 480 kW per car (7000 series)
- Electric system: 1,500 V DC
- Current collection: Overhead catenary
- Bogies: S-DT58 (7000 series); S-TR58 (7100 series)
- Safety system: ATS-SS
- Coupling system: Shibata-type
- Multiple working: 6000 series・7200 series
- Track gauge: 1,067 mm (3 ft 6 in)

The 7000 series (7000系) is an electric multiple unit (EMU) train type operated by Shikoku Railway Company (JR Shikoku) in Shikoku, Japan, since November 1990.

== Operations ==
The sets are based at Takamatsu and Matsuyama depots, and operate on the Yosan Line and Dosan Line. The 7000 series can operate as single-car sets, but the 7100 subseries is single-ended, and must be operated coupled with another 7000 series unit. The sets are designed for use on wanman driver only operation services.

== Formations ==
As of 1 April 2012, the fleet consists of 25 7000 series motored cars and 11 7100 series trailer cars.

Designation	cMc	Tc
Numbering	7000	7100
Capacity (Total/seated)	149/64	154/69
Weight (t)	38.0	26.0

The "cMc" (7000 series) cars are fitted with one S-PS58 lozenge-type pantograph. The "Tc" (7100 series) trailer cars have no pantographs and can not operate alone.

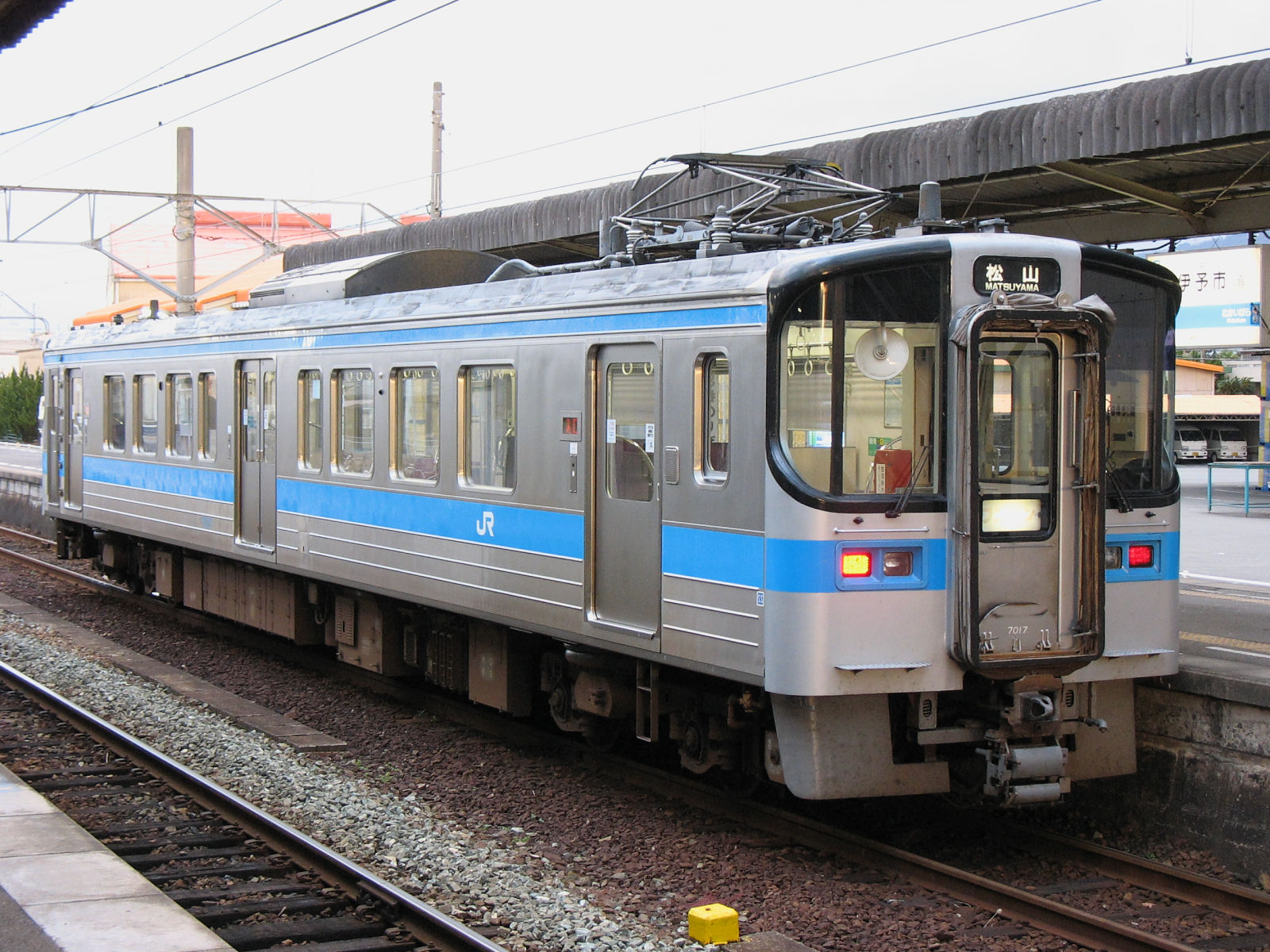
Double-ended car 7017 at Iyoshi Station, January 2008

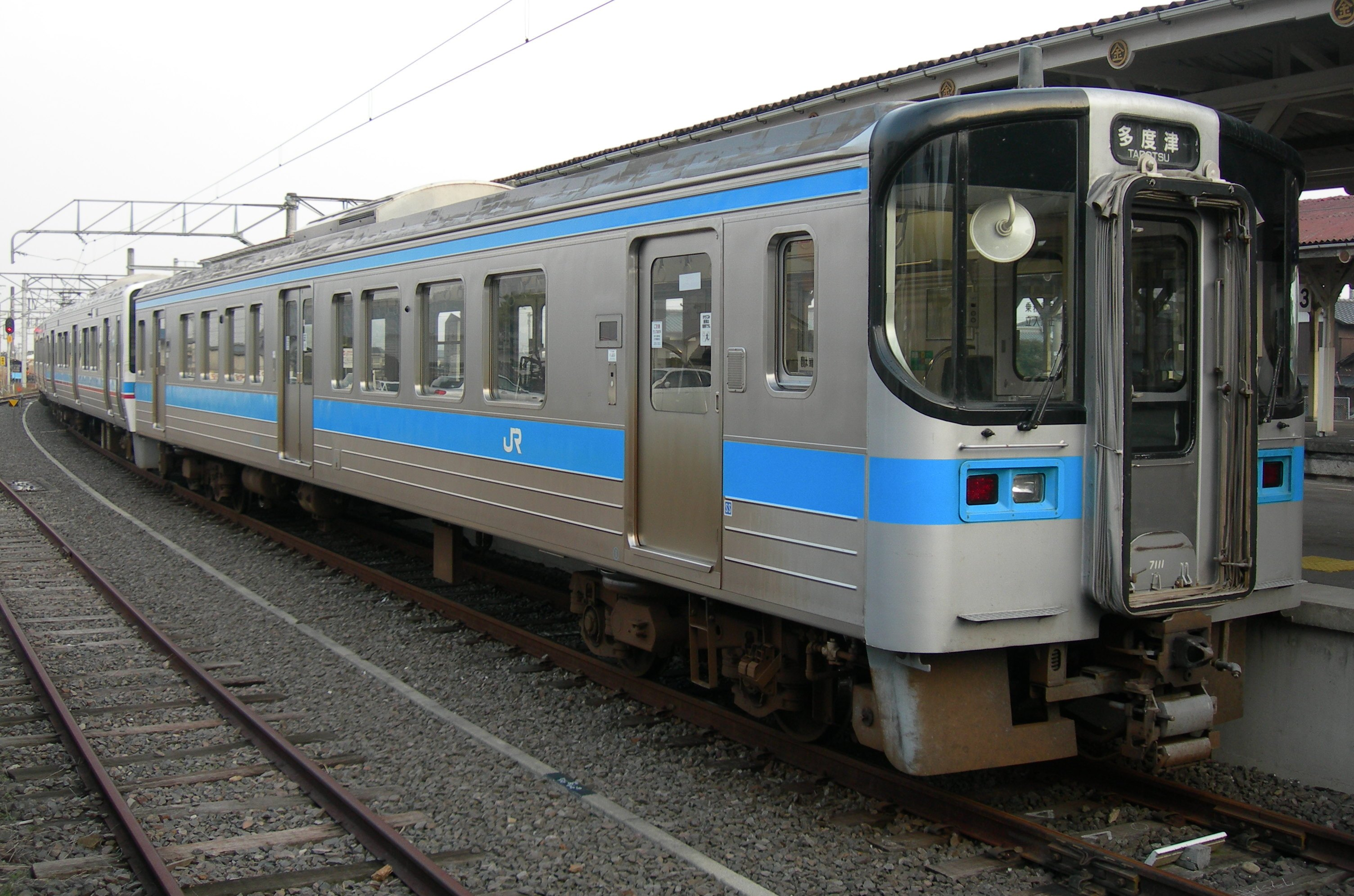
Single-ended car 7111 at Kotohira Station, January 2008

== Interior ==
Seating accommodation consists of longitudinal bench seating on one side and transverse seating on the other side of each car, in a similar style to the JR Shikoku 1000 series diesel units.

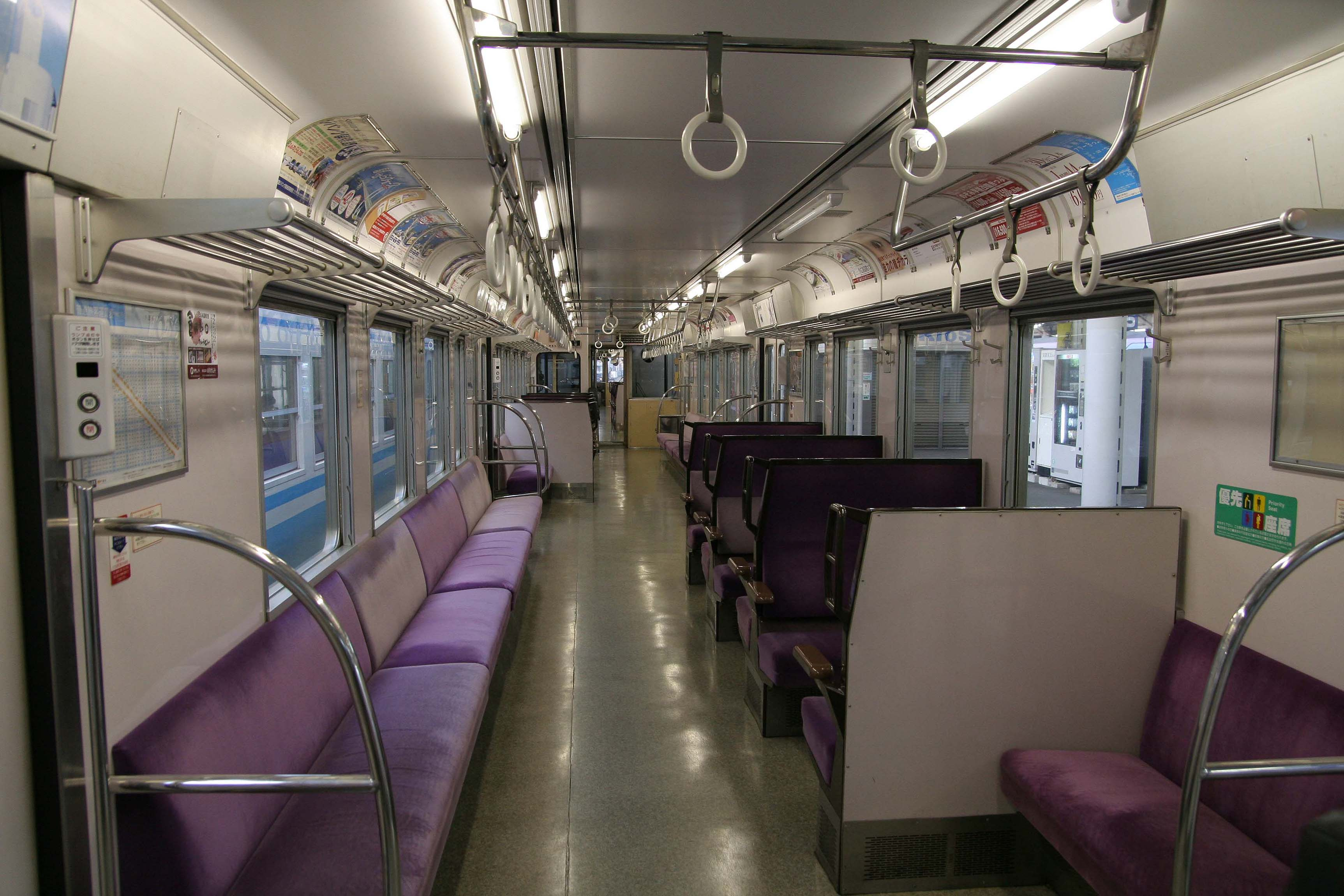
Interior view of car 7018, December 2007

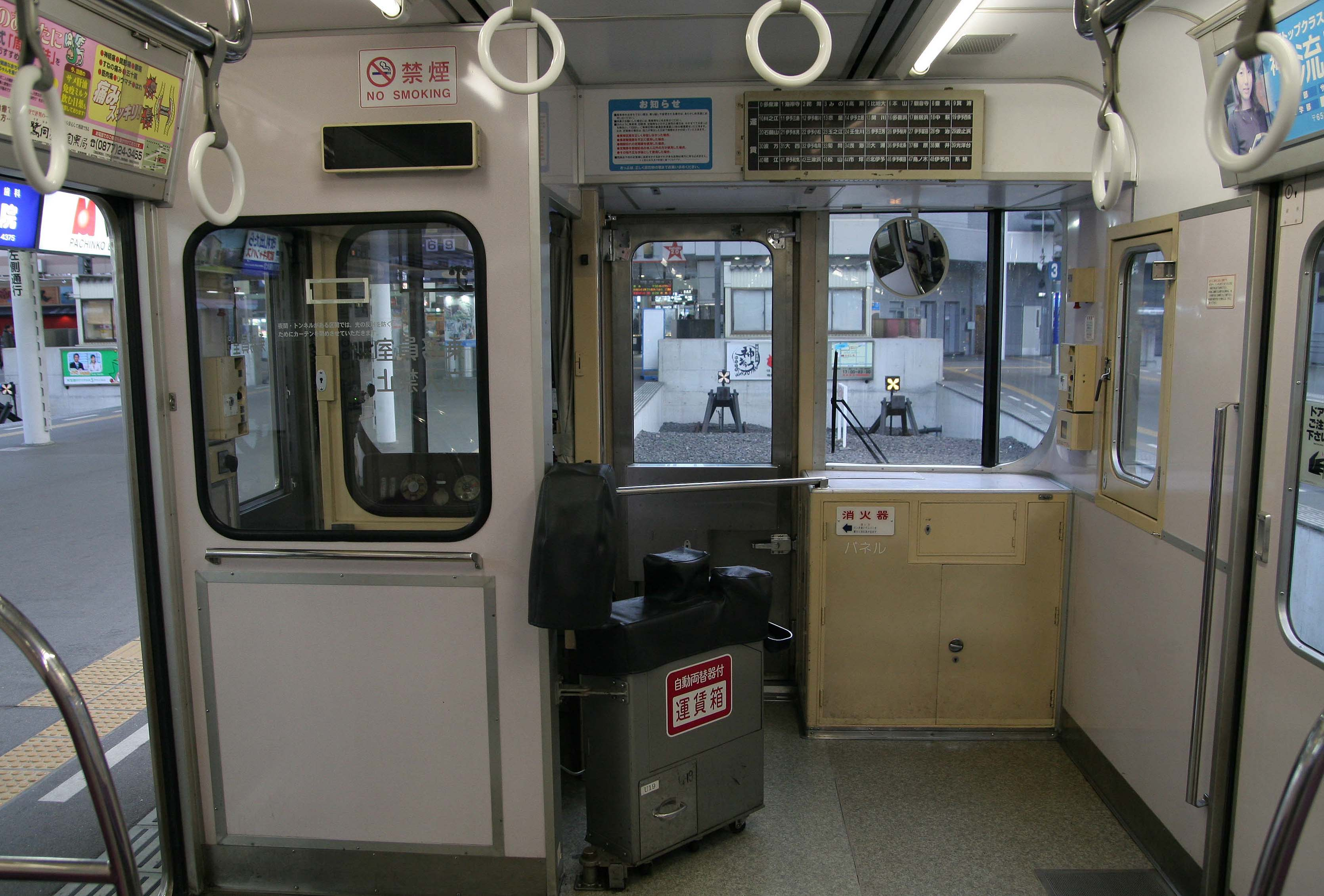
Driver's cab of car 7018, showing fare collection equipment for driver-only-operation services, December 2007

== Bogies ==
The bogies use a bolsterless design based on the standard 205 series EMU bogies, designated S-DT58 for the motored 7000 series cars, and S-TR58 for the trailer 7100 series cars.

== History ==
The 7000 series trains were first introduced from 21 November 1990.
