= 121 series =

Japanese electric multiple unit train type

121 series 7200 series
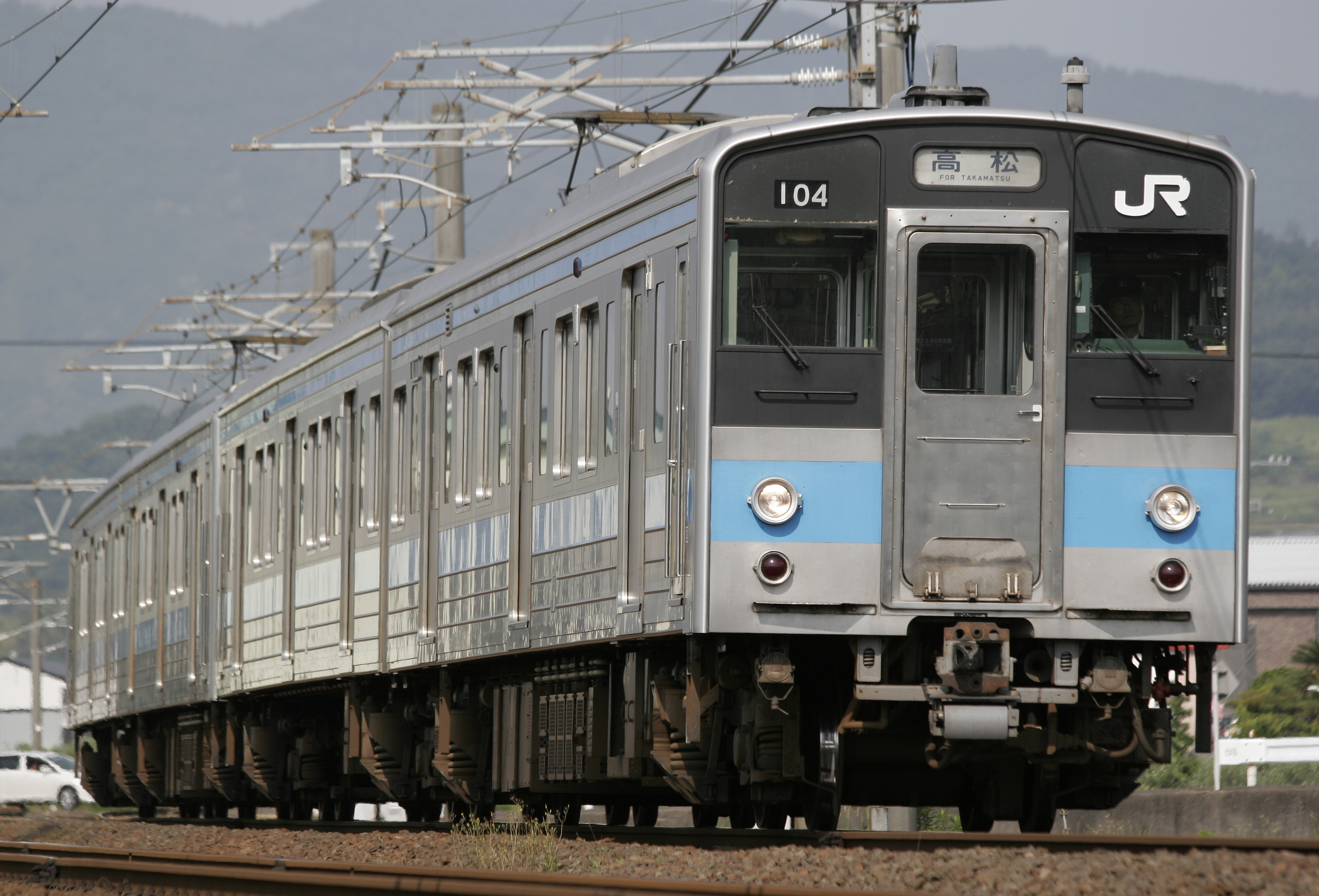
- A pair of 121 series sets on the Yosan Line in May 2009
- In service: March 1987 – 2019 (as 121 series); April 2016 – present (as 7200 series)
- Manufacturers: Hitachi, Kawasaki Heavy Industries, Kinki Sharyo, Tokyu Car Corporation
- Replaced: 121 series (until 2019)
- Constructed: 1986–1987
- Refurbished: 2016–2019
- Number built: 38 vehicles (19 sets)
- Number in service: 38 vehicles (19 sets)
- Formation: 2 cars per trainset
- Operators: 121 series: JNR (1987); JR Shikoku (1987–2019); 7200 series: JR Shikoku (2016–present)
- Depot: Takamatsu
- Lines served: Dosan Line, Yosan Line

Specifications
- Car body construction: Stainless steel
- Car length: 20,000 mm (65 ft 7 in)
- Width: 2,800 mm (9 ft 2 in)
- Height: 3,670 mm (12 ft 0 in)
- Floor height: 1,180 mm (3 ft 10 in)
- Doors: 3 pairs per side
- Maximum speed: 100 km/h (62 mph)
- Traction system: 121 series: Resistor control; 7200 series: Toyo S-CS63A IGBT-VVVF
- Traction motors: MT55A (121 series); S-MT64 (7200 series)
- Power output: 121 series: 110 kW x 4; 7200 series: 140 kW x 4
- Acceleration: 2.0 km/(h⋅s) (1.2 mph/s)
- Electric systems: 1,500 V DC (overhead catenary)
- Current collection: Pantograph
- Bogies: 121 series: DT33A (motored); DT12T (trailer); 7200 series: S-DT67ef (motored); S-TR67ef (trailer)
- Multiple working: 7200 series: 7000 series
- Track gauge: 1,067 mm (3 ft 6 in)

The 121 series (121系) is an electric multiple unit (EMU) train type introduced in March 1987 by Japanese National Railways (JNR), and currently operated by Shikoku Railway Company (JR Shikoku) on local services in Shikoku, Japan, as the 7200 series.

== Design ==
The 121 series design was based on the earlier 105 series, with lightweight stainless steel bodies.

The motor bogies were the same DT33A bogies as used on the JNR-era 103 series EMUs, and the trailer cars used DT21T bogies recovered from withdrawn 101 series EMUs. The pantographs were also recovered from withdrawn 101 series EMUs.

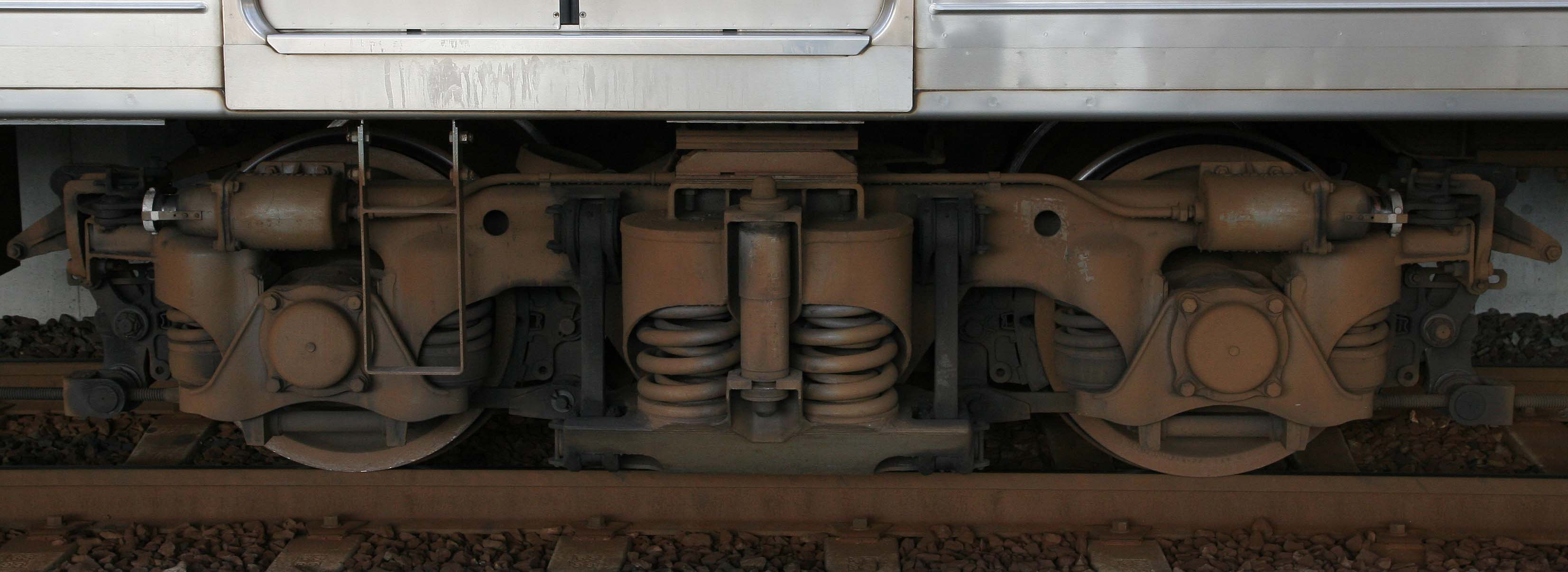
A DT21T trailer bogie

== Operations ==
The sets are based at Takamatsu Depot and operate on the Yosan Line and Dosan Line in 2-, 4-, or 6-car formations.

== Formations ==
In 2019 the fleet consisted of 18 two-car 121 series sets and one 7200 series formed of one motored "Mc" car and one non-powered "Tc" trailer car as shown below with the motored "Mc" cars at the Takamatsu end.

As of December 2024, the 7200 series trains were being used for stopping and rapid services on the Dosan Line (Tadotsu - Kotohira) and the Yosan Line (Takamatsu - Iyo-Saijo). Some of the services consist of three or four coaches with 7000 series.

=== 121 series ===
Designation	Mc	Tc
Numbering	KuMoHa 121	KuHa 120
Weight (t)	42.0	28.0
Capacity (total/seated)	118/62	118/62

The "Mc" cars are each fitted with one S-PS58 lozenge-type pantograph.

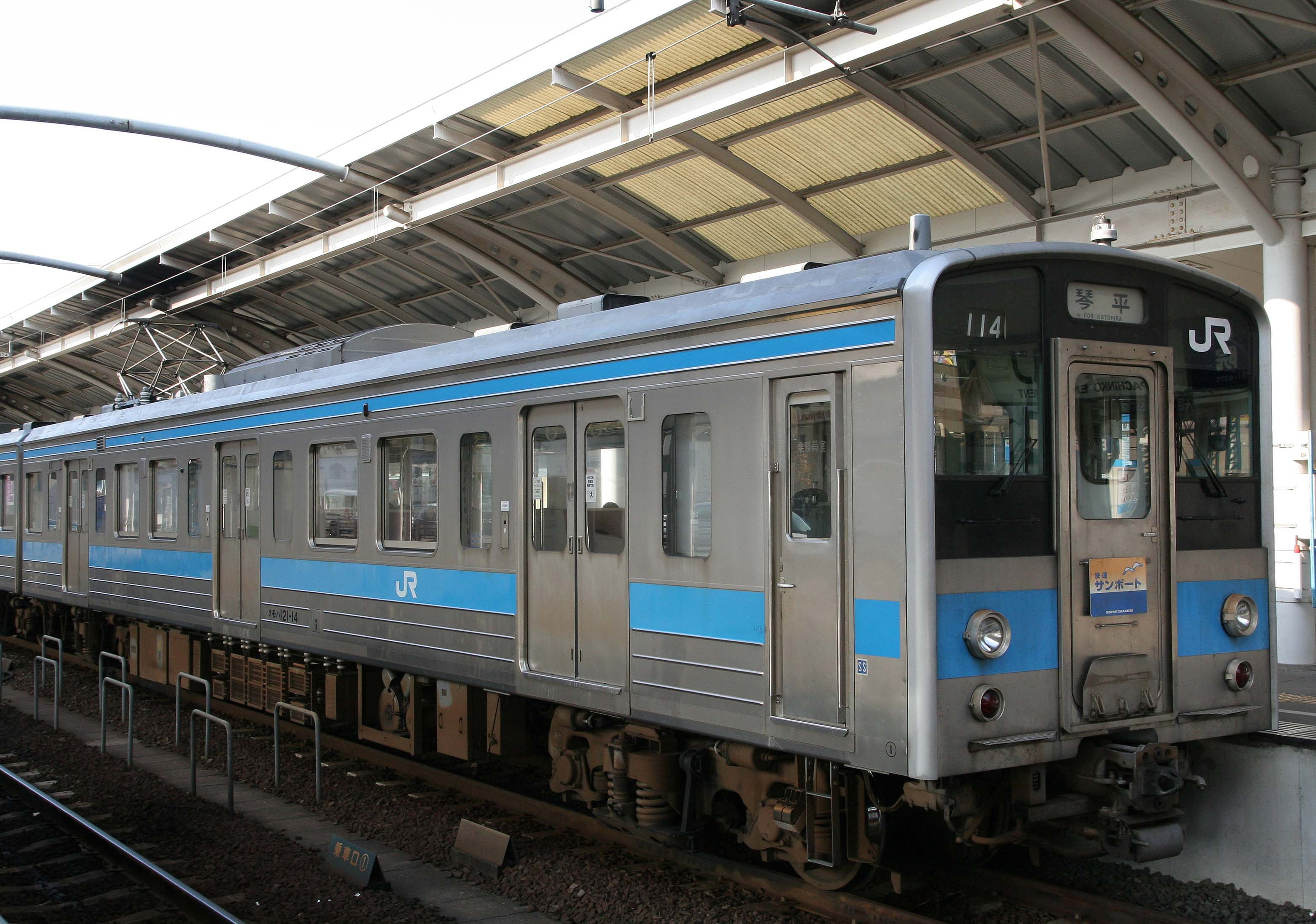
KuMoHa 121-14 in December 2007

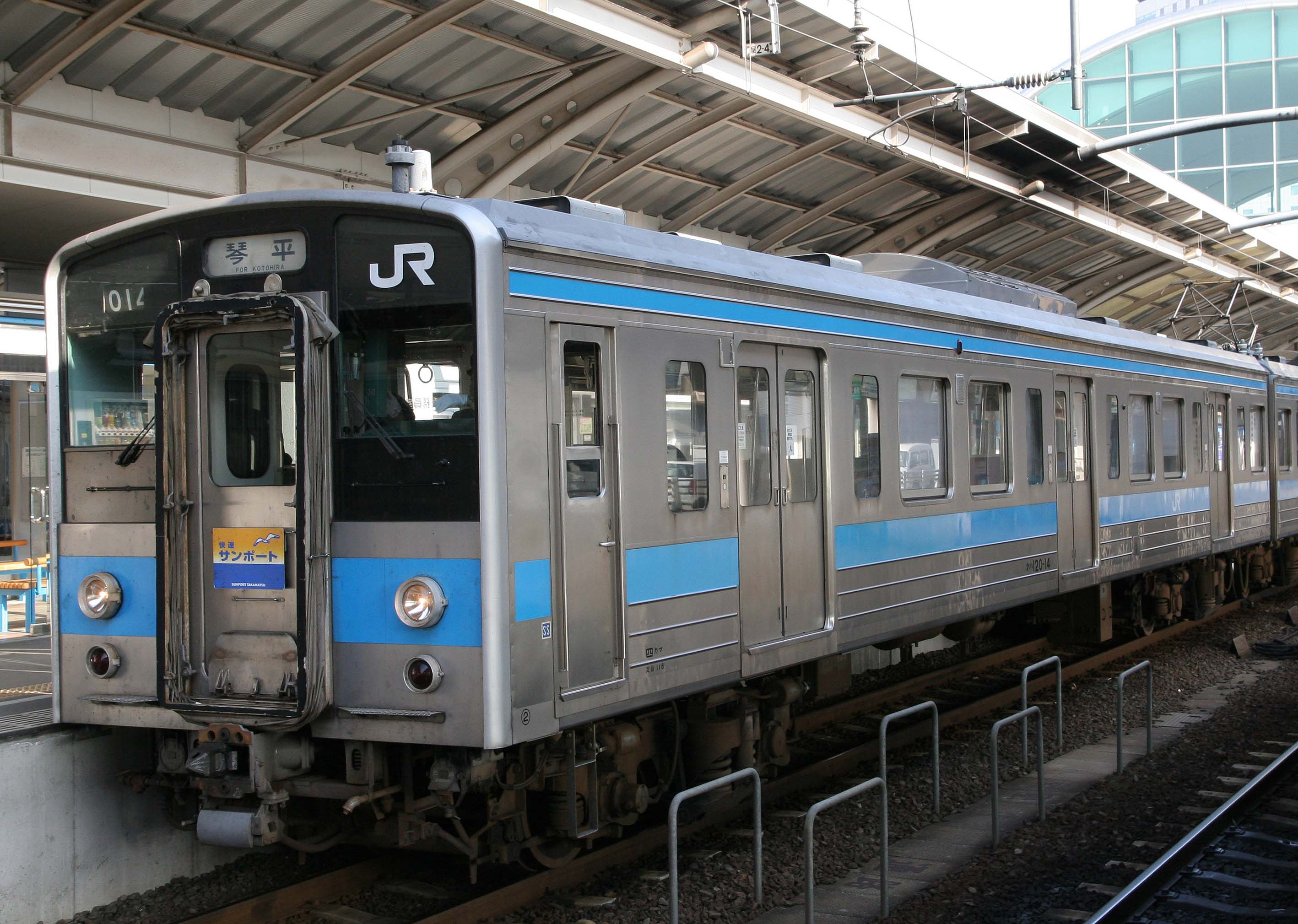
KuHa 120-14 in December 2007

=== 7200 series ===
Designation	Mc	Tc
Numbering	KuMoHa 7200	KuHa 7300
Weight (t)	37.6	28.5
Capacity (total/seated)	132/52	132/52

The "Mc" cars are each fitted with one S-PS58 lozenge-type pantograph.

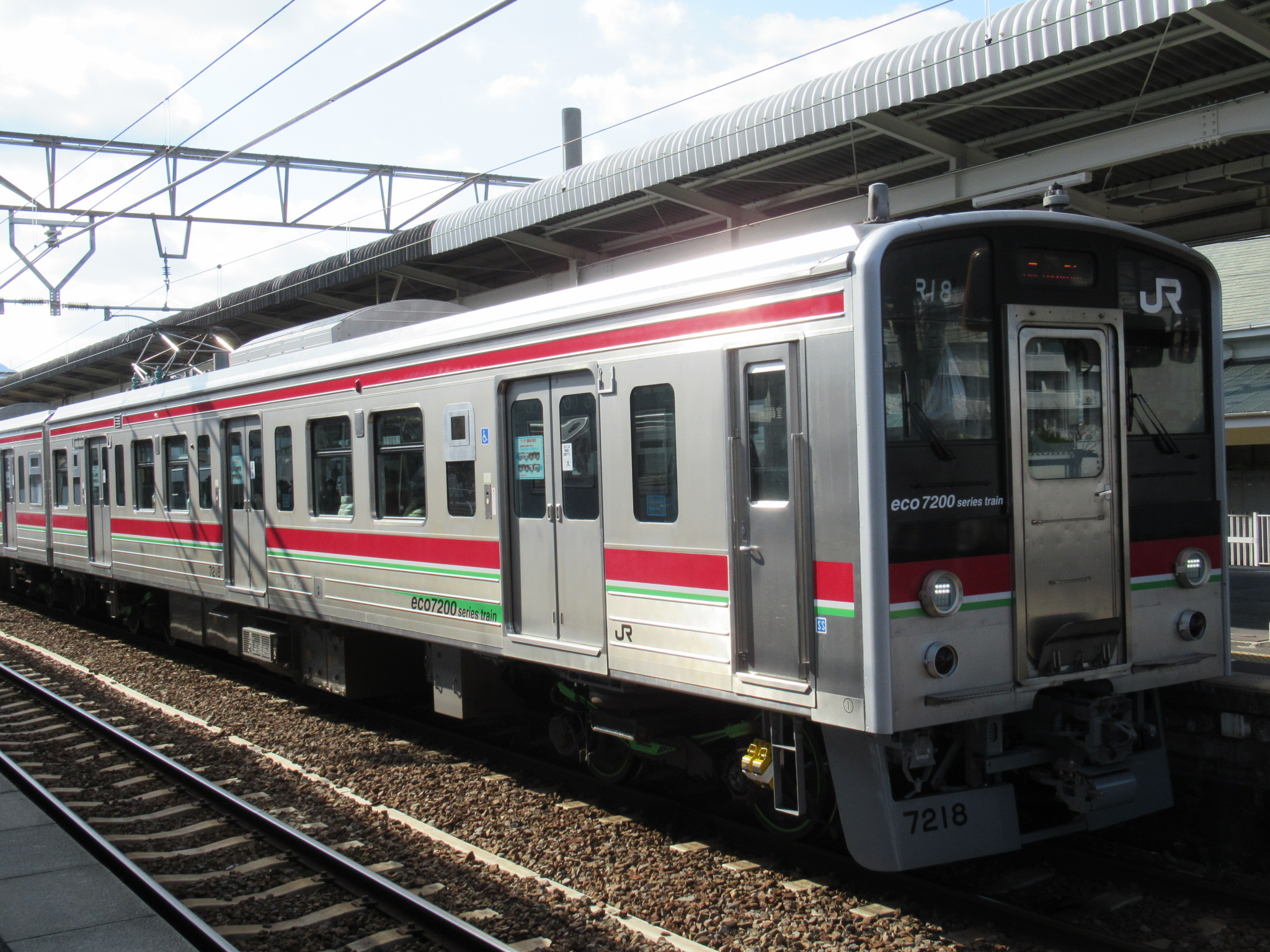
7218 in January 2019

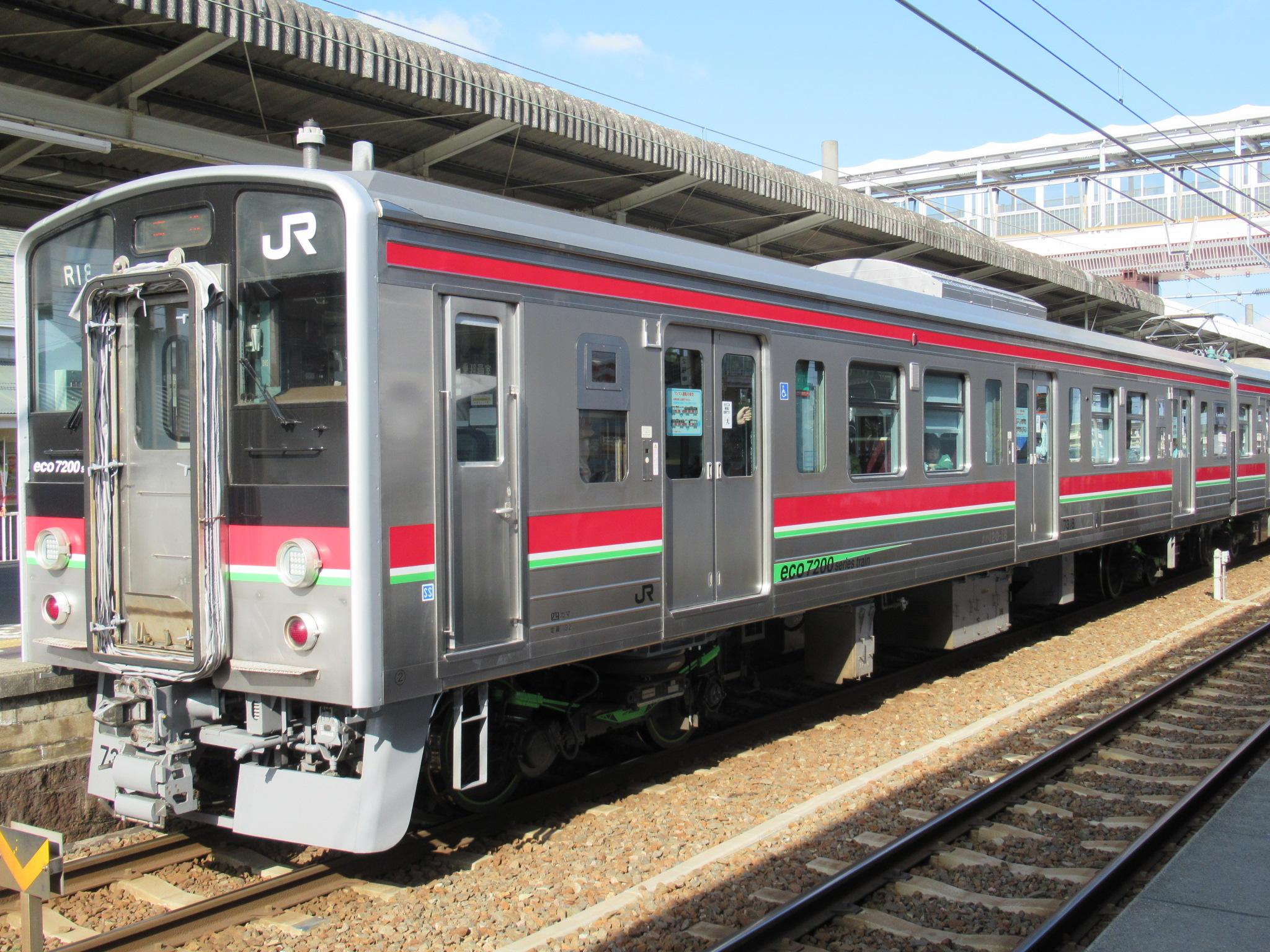
7318 in January 2019

== Interiors ==
Seating is arranged as a mix of transverse seating bays and longitudinal bench seats. The sets are not equipped with toilets.

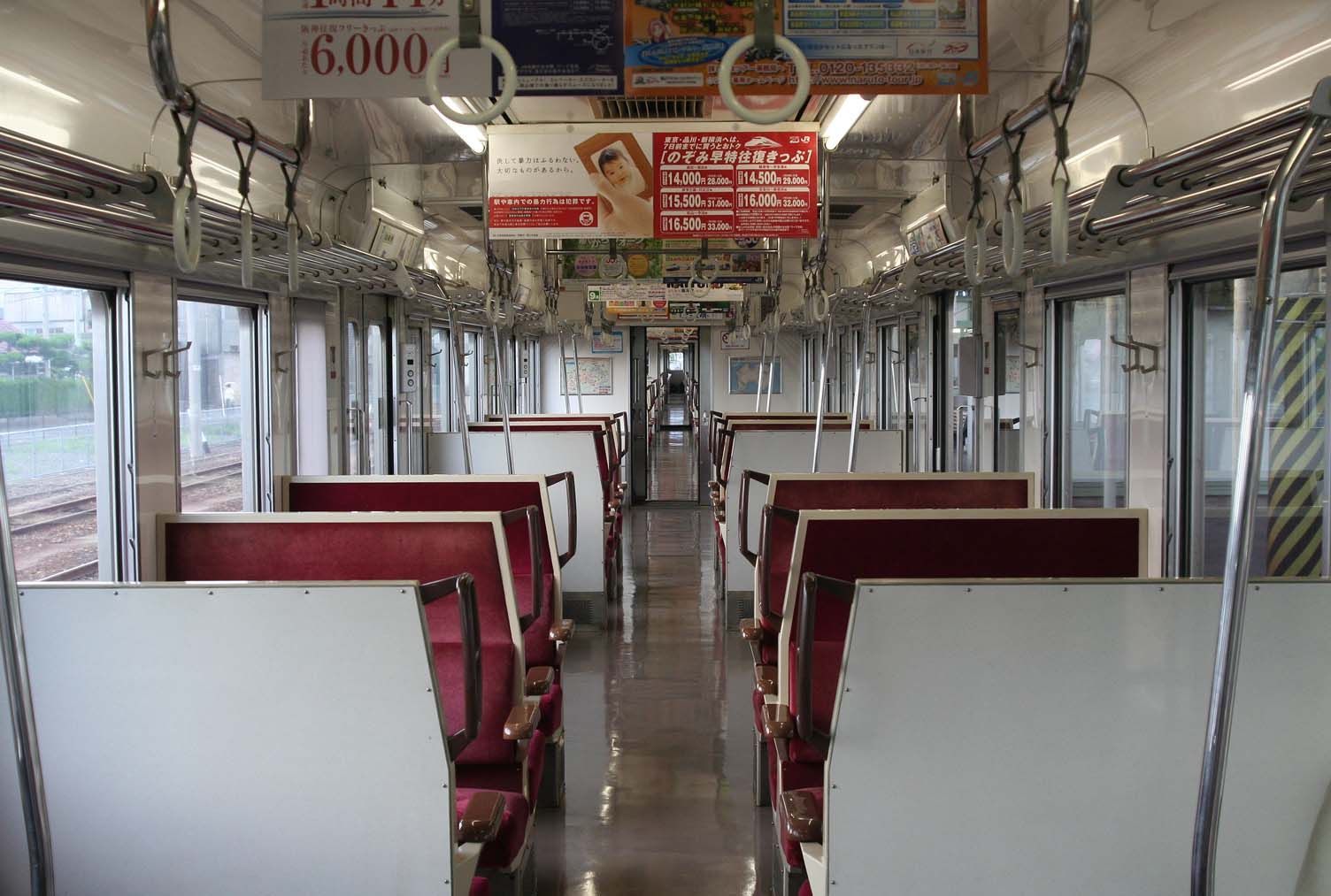
An interior view in September 2007

== History ==
The 121 series sets were introduced on 23 March 1987, just nine days before JNR was privatised on 1 April, following which the 121 series fleet came under control of JR Shikoku. The sets were originally delivered with magenta "Red No. 20" bodyside stripes, but were repainted with JR Shikoku corporate light blue ("Blue No. 26") bodyside stripes during September and October 1987.

In 1992, the original pantographs were replaced with the same S-PS58 type pantographs also used on the JR Shikoku 7000 series EMUs to ensure adequate clearance through tunnels on newly electrified sections of the Yosan Line.

In 2011, two sets (numbers 001 and 002) were modified for wanman driver only operation. These sets were repainted with their original JNR-style magenta bodyside stripes.

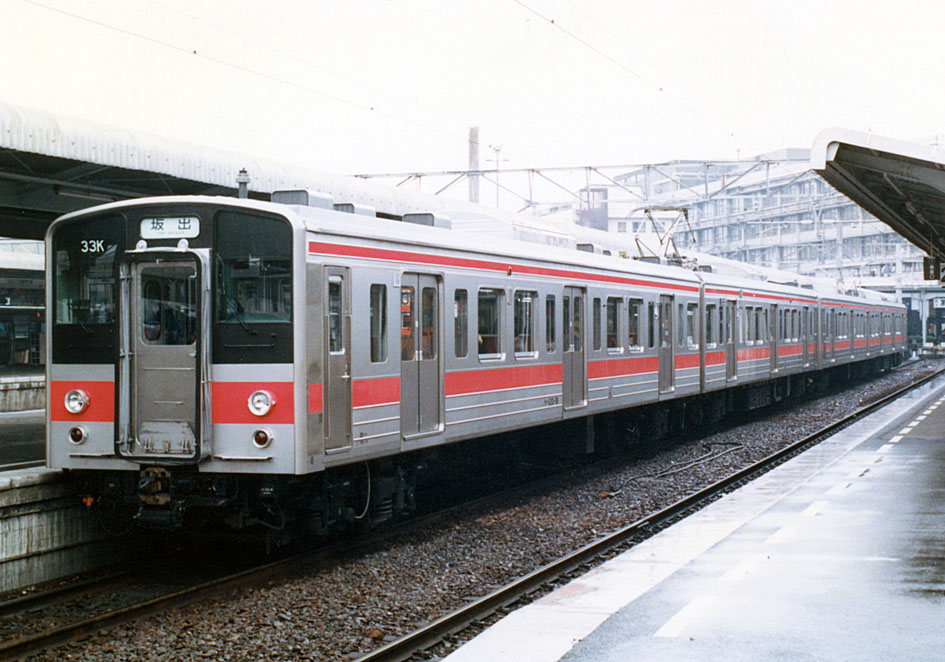
121 series sets in original JNR livery, circa 1987

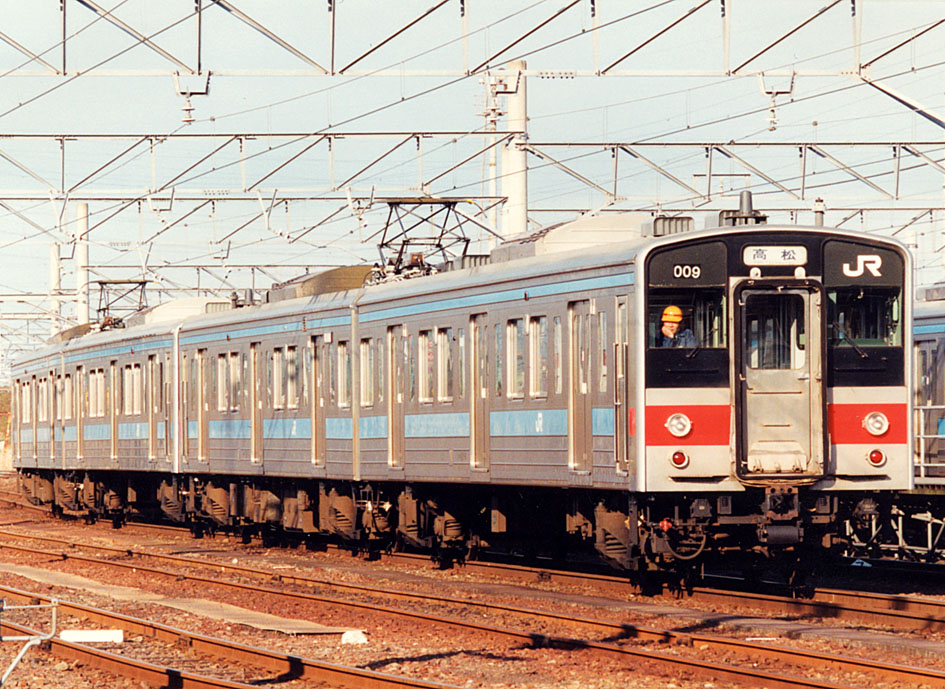
Set 009 with a front-end red warning stripe added for a short period during the 1990s

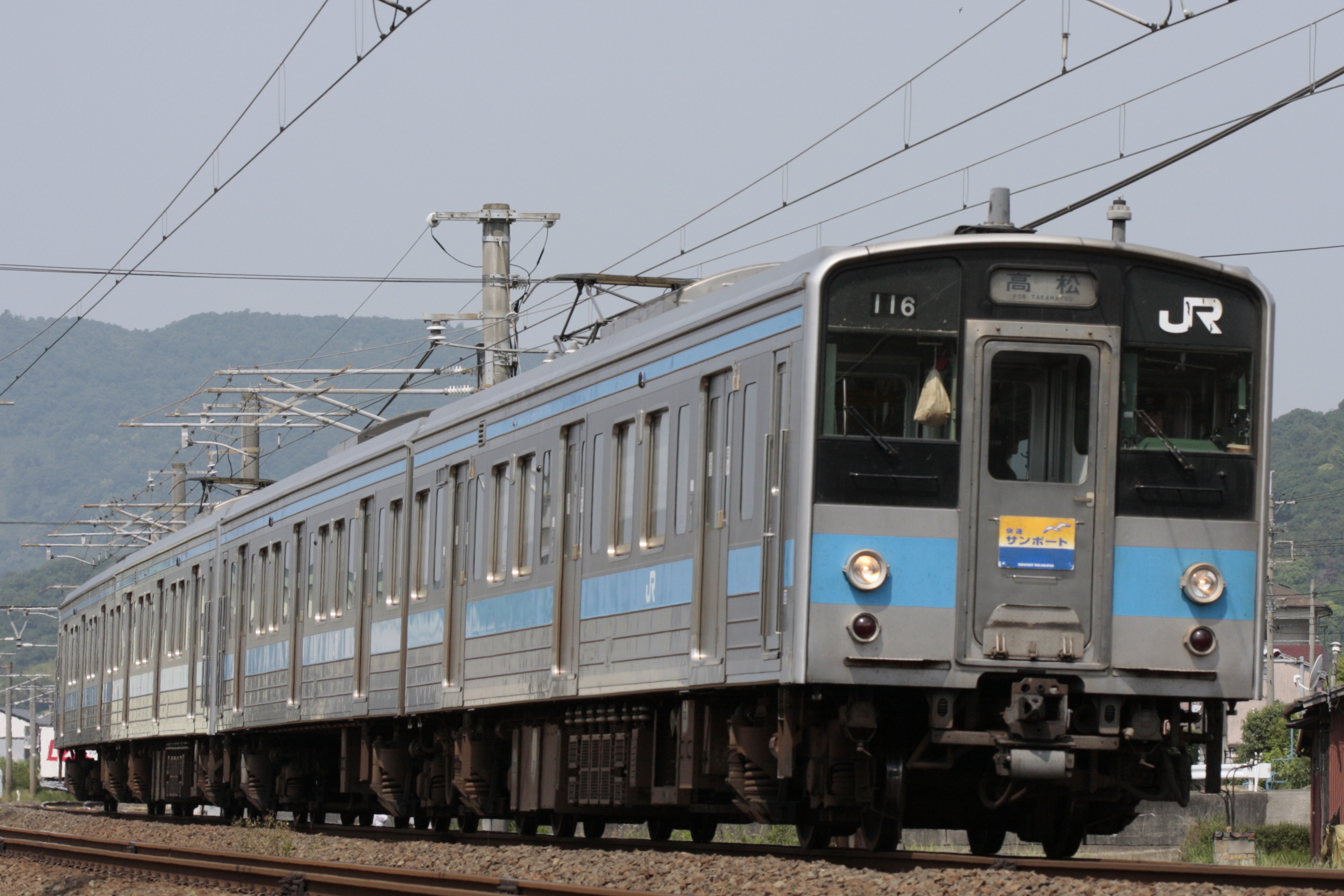
A pair of 121 series sets in May 2009

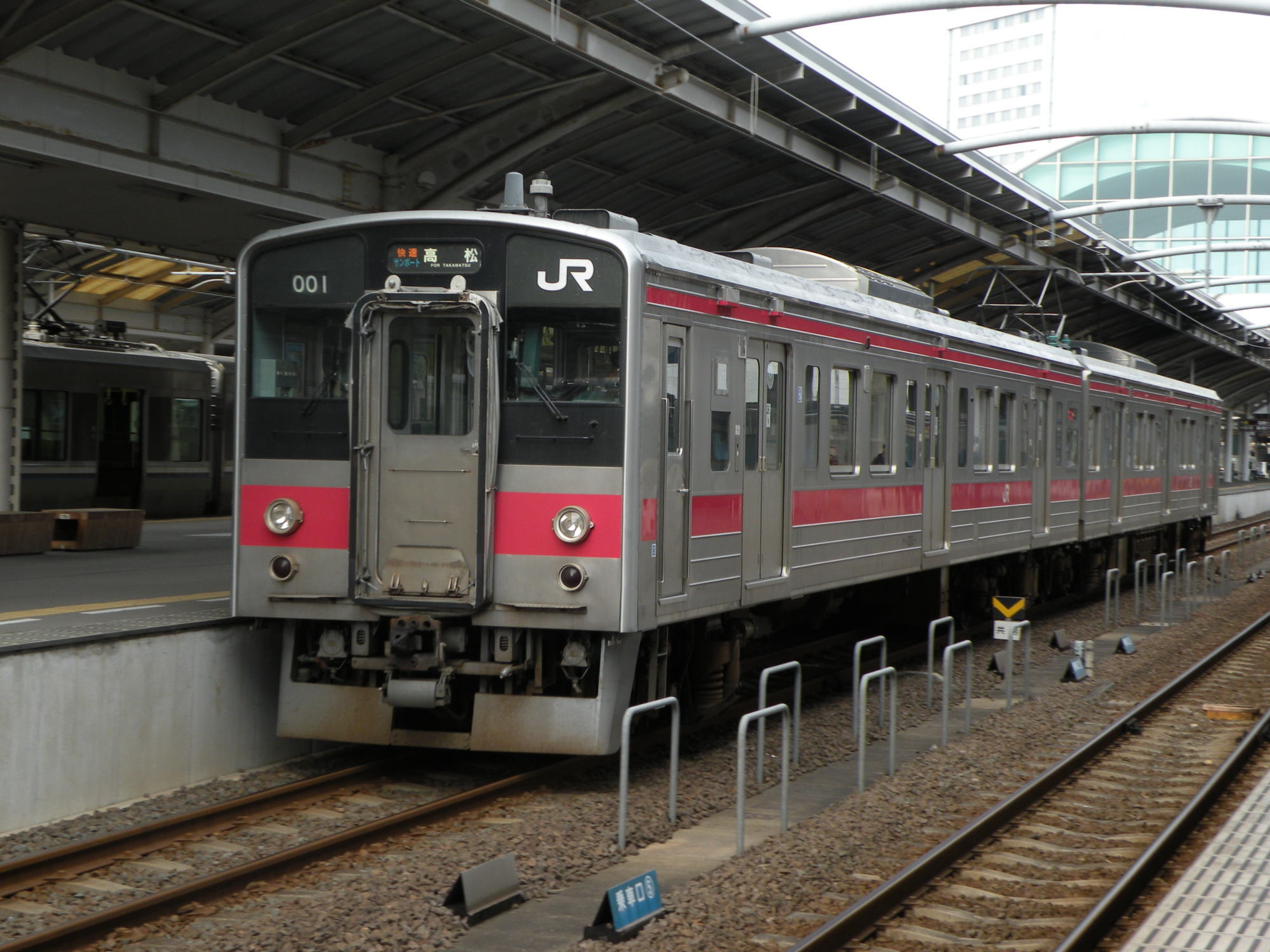
Modified driver-only set 001 in April 2012

== Refurbishment and conversion ==
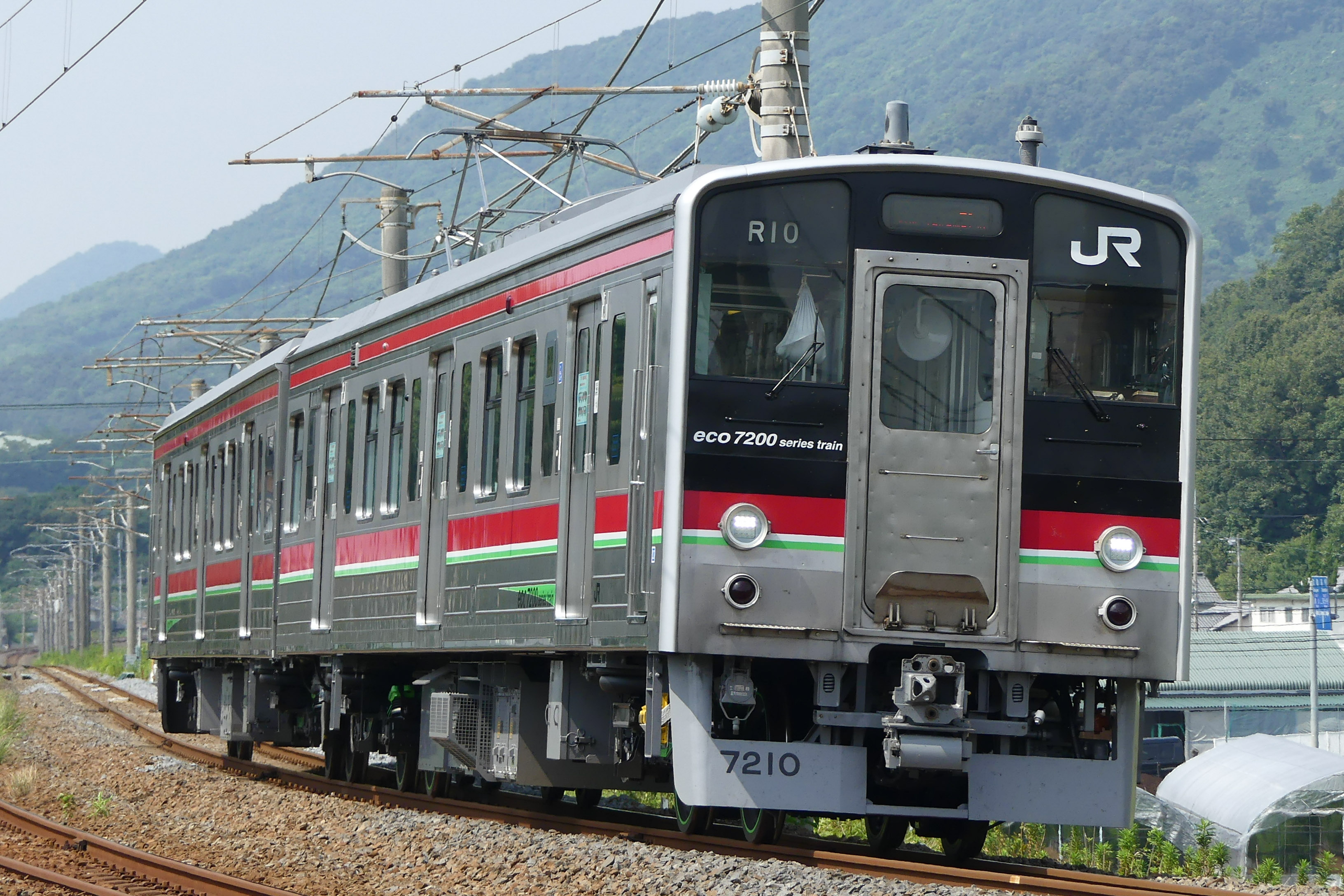
7200 series set R10 in September 2018

From 2016 to 2018, the entire fleet of 19 two-car trainsets underwent refurbishment, and then were reclassified as the "7200 series" (see fleet history, below). Refurbishment included replacement of the DC motors with 140 kW AC motors and VVVF control, new side windows, new "efWing" CFRP bogies (S-DT67ef motor bogies and S-TR67ef trailer bogies), and a new livery based on the original style with a thin green line added to the magenta bodyside stripe. Internally, the refurbished trains have fixed four-person seating bays on one side with longitudinal bench seating on the other.

The first trainset to be treated, set 3, departed the JR Shikoku's Tadotsu Works in February 2016, and entered service from 13 June 2016.

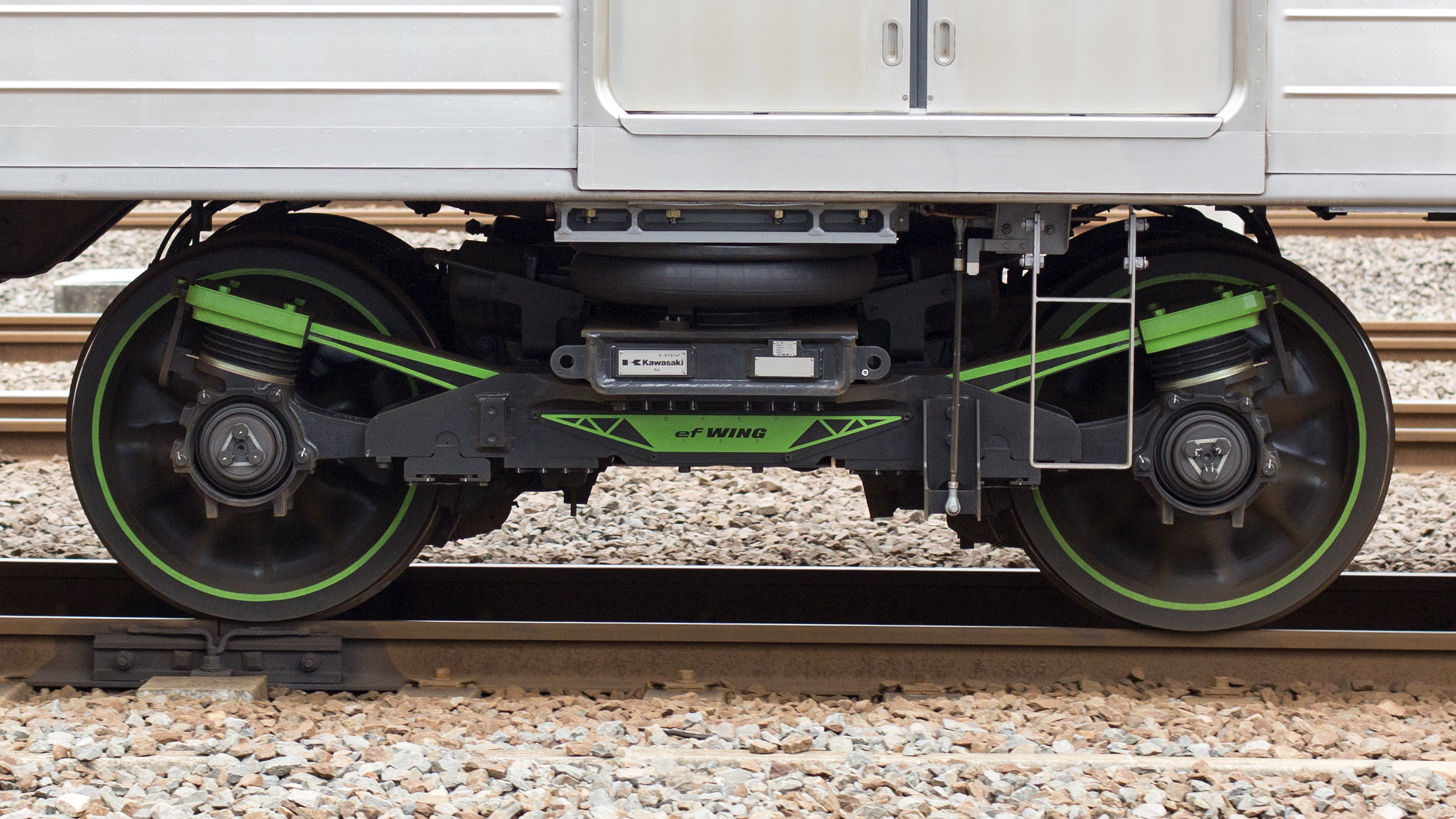
An S-DT67ef motor bogie on car KuMoHa 7203

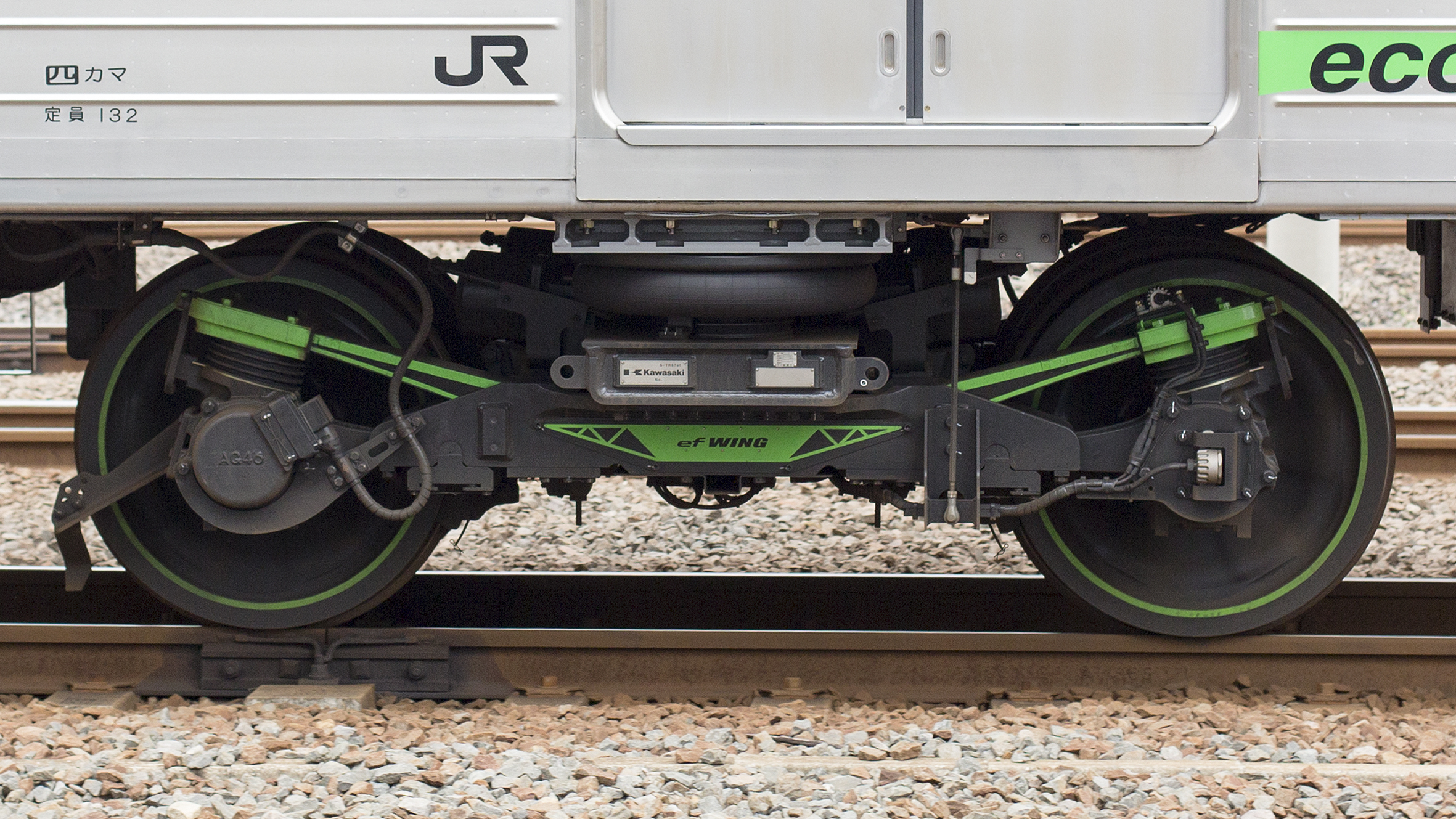
An S-TR67ef trailer bogie on car KuHa 7303

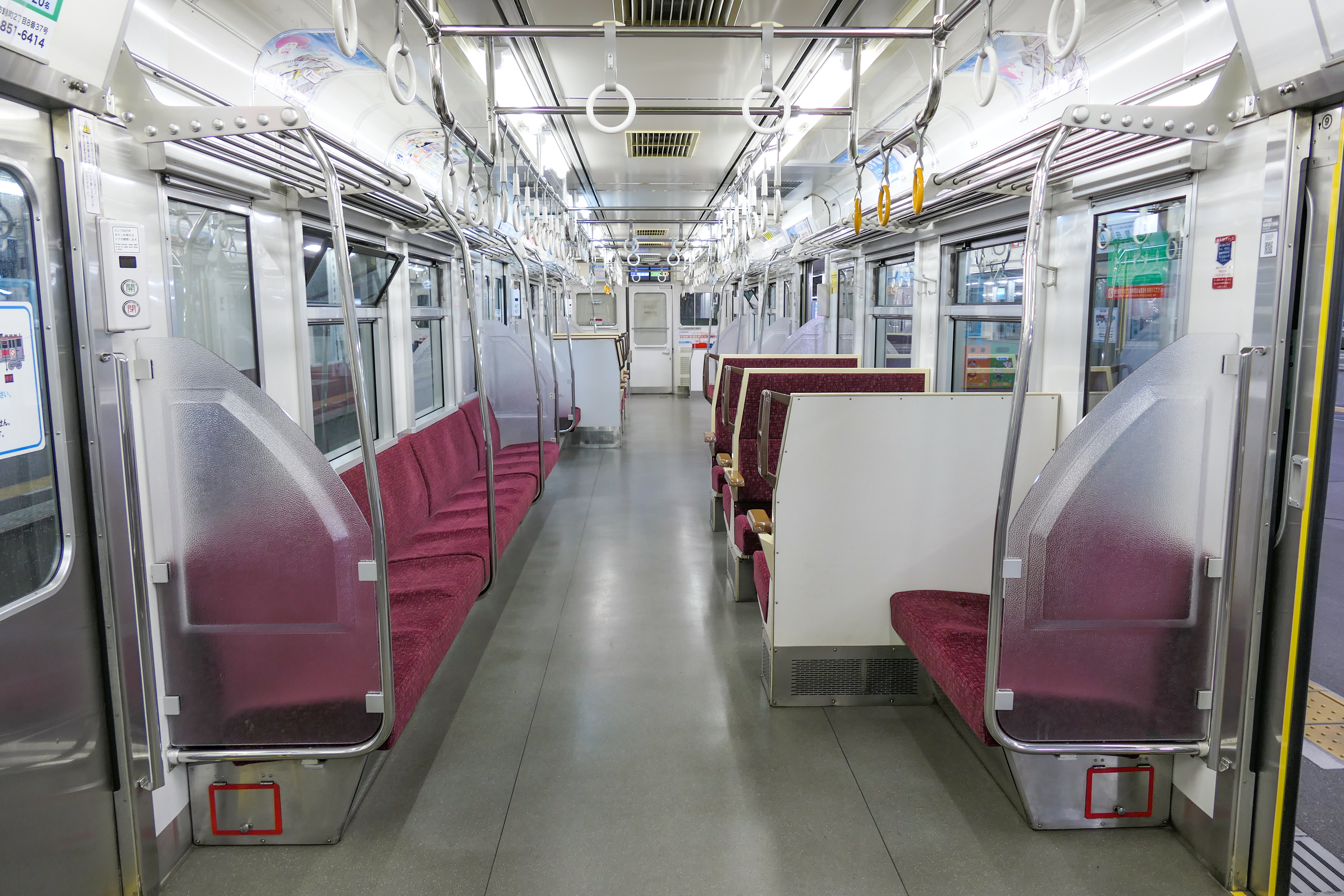
Inside the car

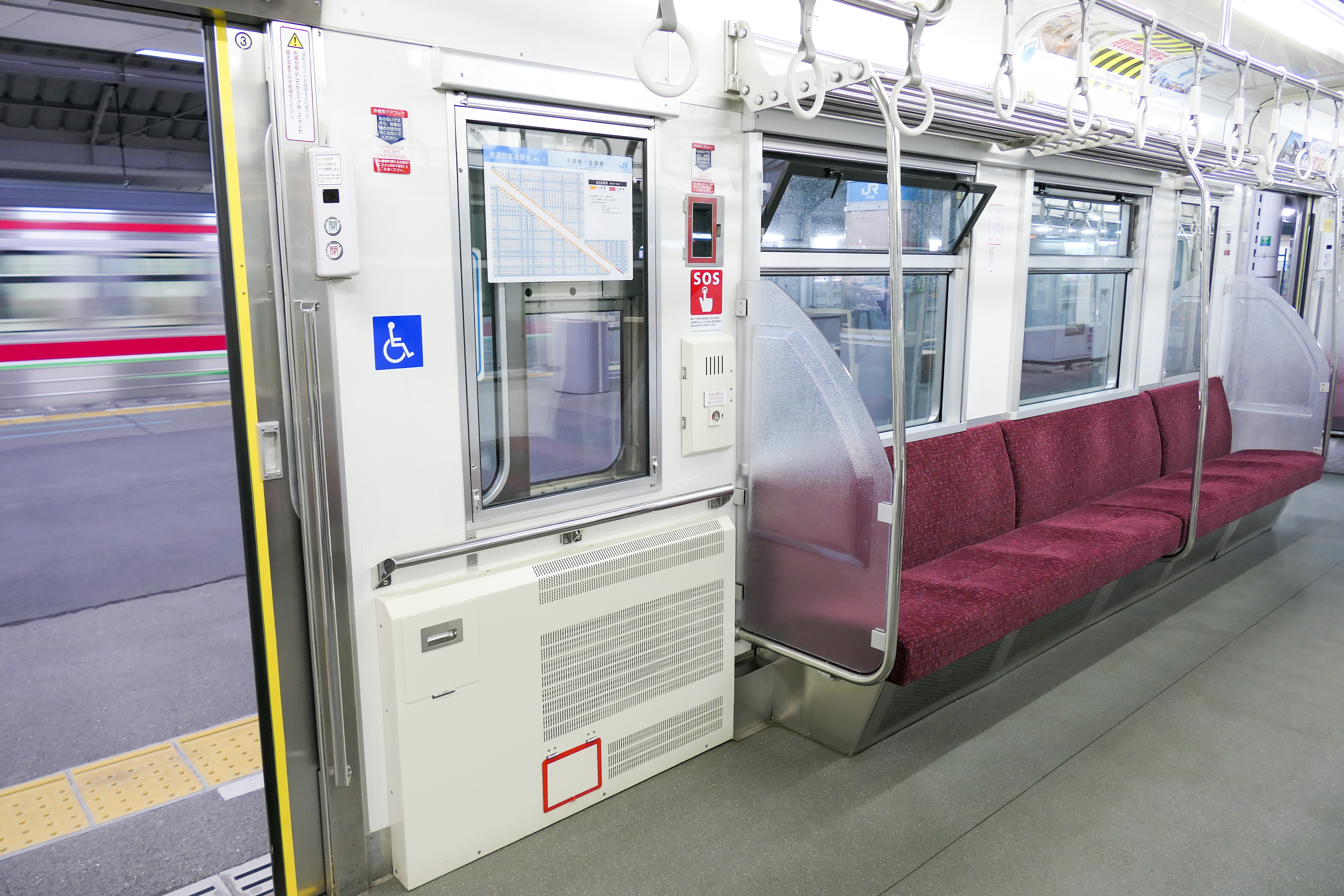
Wheelchair space

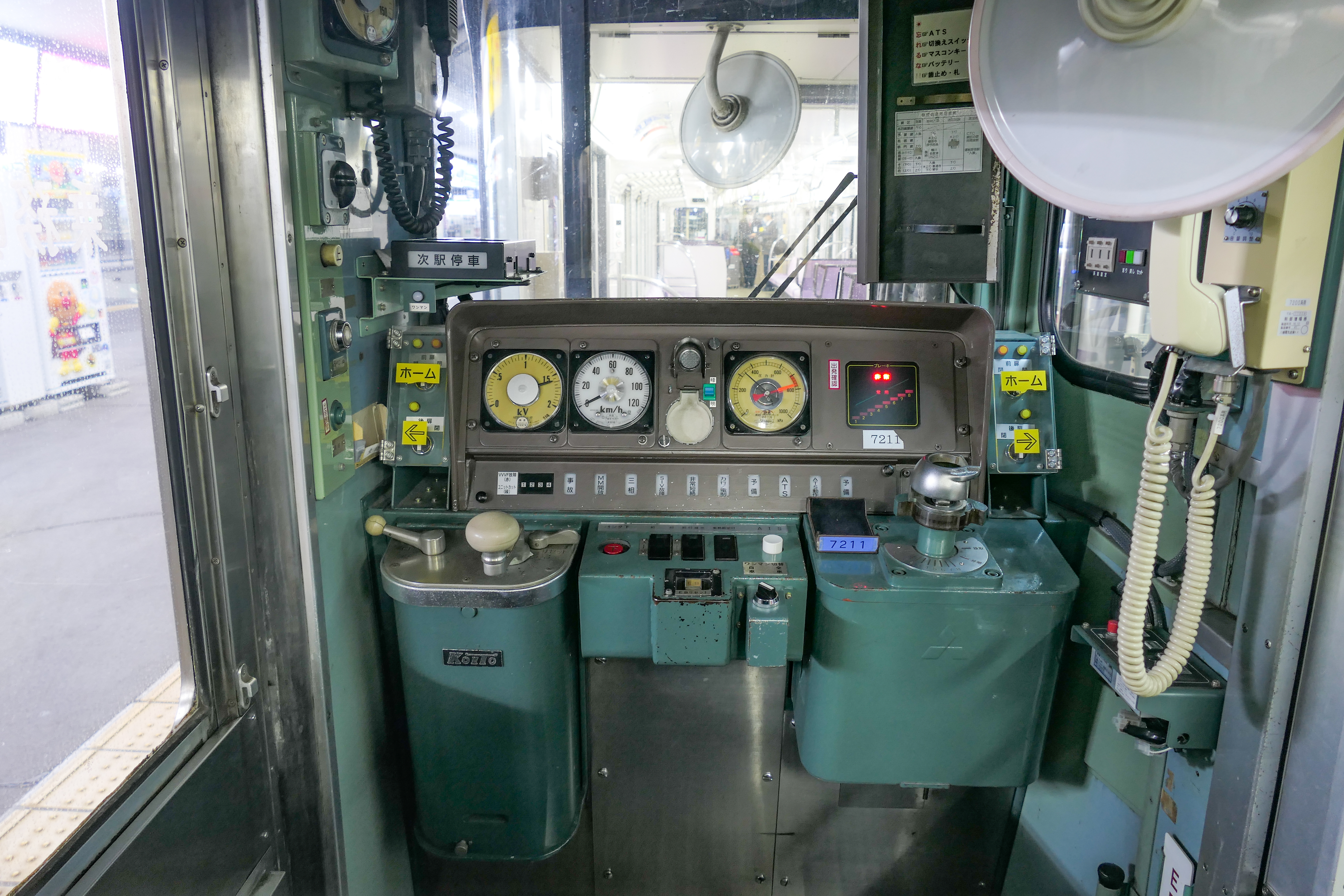
Driver's cab

== Fleet history ==
The individual build histories for the fleet are as follows.

Set No.	Manufacturer	Date delivered	7200 series conversion date
001	Hitachi	17 November 1986	12 October 2018
002	Kinki Sharyo	20 November 1986	18 February 2019
003	Kawasaki Heavy Industries	13 December 1986	15 March 2016
004	Kawasaki Heavy Industries	13 December 1986	9 September 2016
005	Kinki Sharyo	27 December 1986	28 March 2017
006	Kinki Sharyo	27 December 1986	20 February 2018
007	Kinki Sharyo	27 December 1986	7 November 2017
008	Tokyu Car	27 January 1987	5 June 2017
009	Tokyu Car	27 January 1987	28 February 2017
010	Tokyu Car	27 January 1987	22 August 2018
011	Tokyu Car	27 January 1987	28 December 2017
012	Hitachi	13 January 1987	2 July 2018
013	Hitachi	27 January 1987	28 October 2016
014	Hitachi	27 January 1987	6 December 2016
015	Kawasaki Heavy Industries	16 January 1987	13 September 2017
016	Kawasaki Heavy Industries	16 January 1987	18 January 2017
017	Kawasaki Heavy Industries	16 January 1987	20 July 2017
018	Kinki Sharyo	20 January 1987	11 December 2018
019	Kinki Sharyo	20 January 1987	28 March 2018
