= JR Shikoku 6000 series =

Japanese train type

6000 series
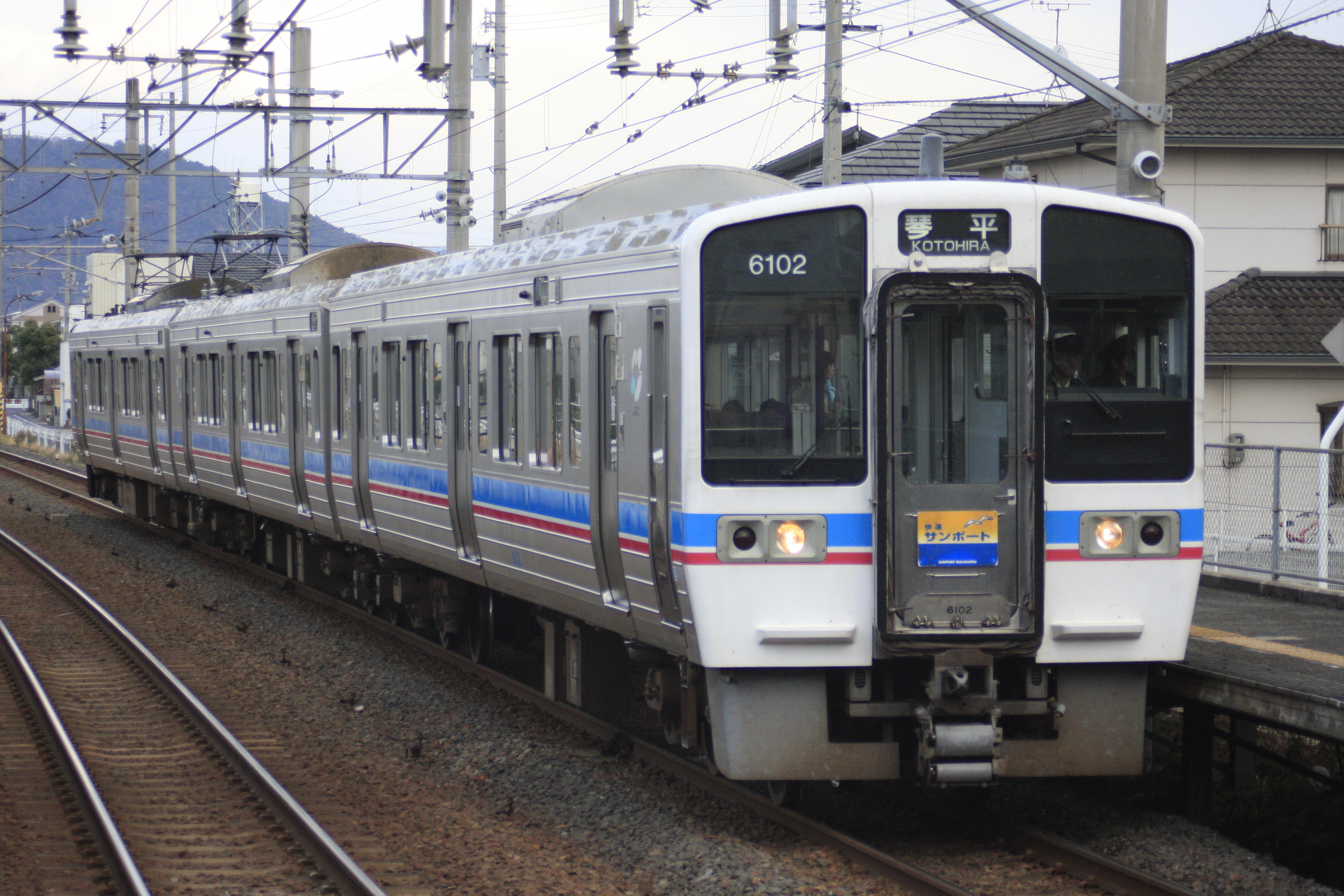
- 6000 series on a Sunport rapid service, September 2011
- In service: April 1996 – present
- Manufacturer: Nippon Sharyo
- Replaced: 111 series
- Constructed: 1996
- Number built: 6 vehicles (2 sets)
- Number in service: 6 vehicles (2 sets)
- Formation: 3 cars per trainset
- Operator: JR Shikoku
- Depot: Takamatsu
- Lines served: Dosan Line, Yosan Line

Specifications
- Car body construction: Stainless steel
- Car length: 19,670 mm (64 ft 6 in) (end cars); 19,500 mm (64 ft 0 in) (intermediate cars)
- Width: 2,966 mm (9 ft 8.8 in)
- Floor height: 1,150 mm (3 ft 9 in)
- Doors: Sliding, 3 pairs per side
- Maximum speed: 110 km/h (68 mph)
- Traction system: Variable frequency (GTO)
- Electric system: 1,500 V DC overhead
- Current collection: Overhead catenary
- Bogies: S-DT62 (motored); S-TR62 (trailer)
- Braking systems: Regenerative brake, electronically controlled pneumatic brakes
- Safety system: ATS-SS
- Coupling system: Shibata-type
- Multiple working: 7000 series
- Track gauge: 1,067 mm (3 ft 6 in)

The 6000 series (6000系) is a suburban electric multiple unit (EMU) train type operated by Shikoku Railway Company (JR Shikoku) in Shikoku, Japan, since 1996.

== Design ==
The cars have stainless steel bodies and cab ends based on the 211 series/213 series design. The doors immediately behind the driving cabs are single-leaf instead of the pairs of doors used at other locations.

== Operations ==
The sets are based at Takamatsu Depot, and operate on the Yosan Line and Dosan Line. Sets can run in multiple with single-car 7000 series EMU trailer cars to form 4-car sets.

== Formations ==
The two 3-car sets are formed as shown below with the motored "Mc" cars at the Takamatsu end.

Designation	Mc	T	Tc'
Numbering	6000	6200	6100
Weight (t)	37.8	28.2	28.0
Capacity (total/seated)	131/56	136/52	131/56

The "Mc" cars are each fitted with two lozenge-type pantographs.

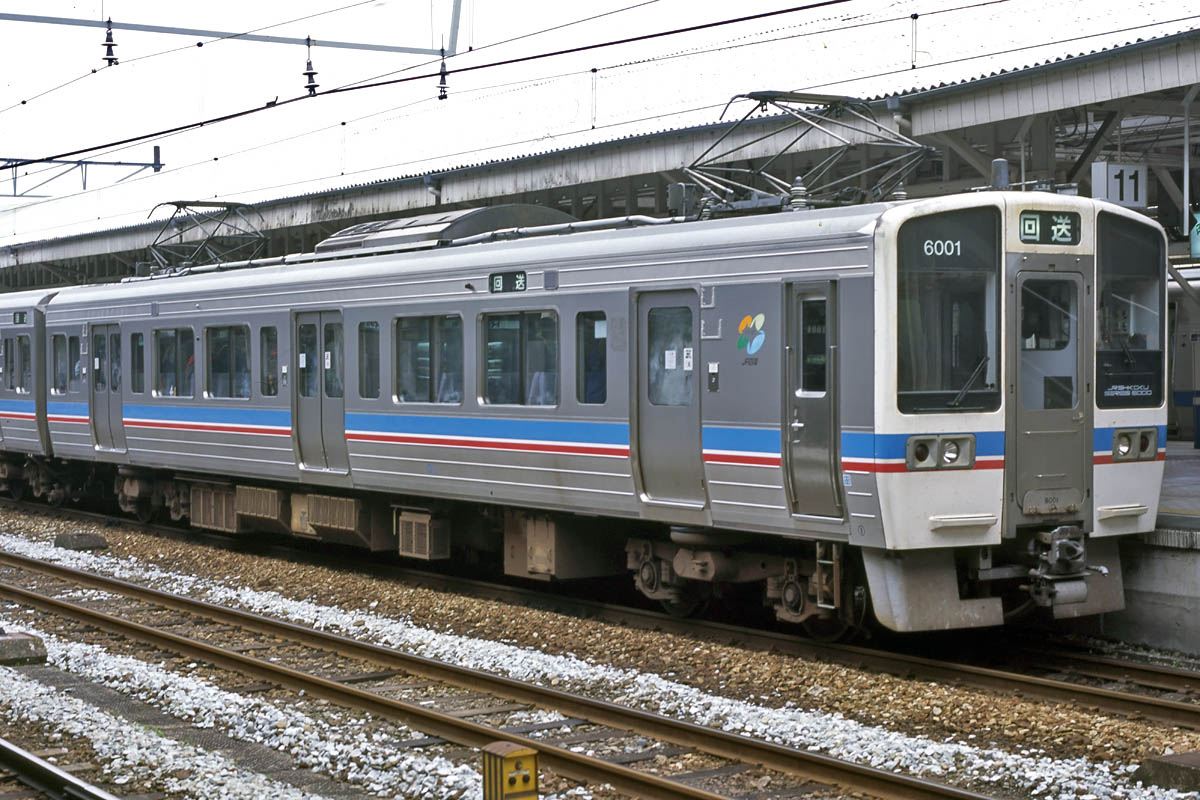
6001

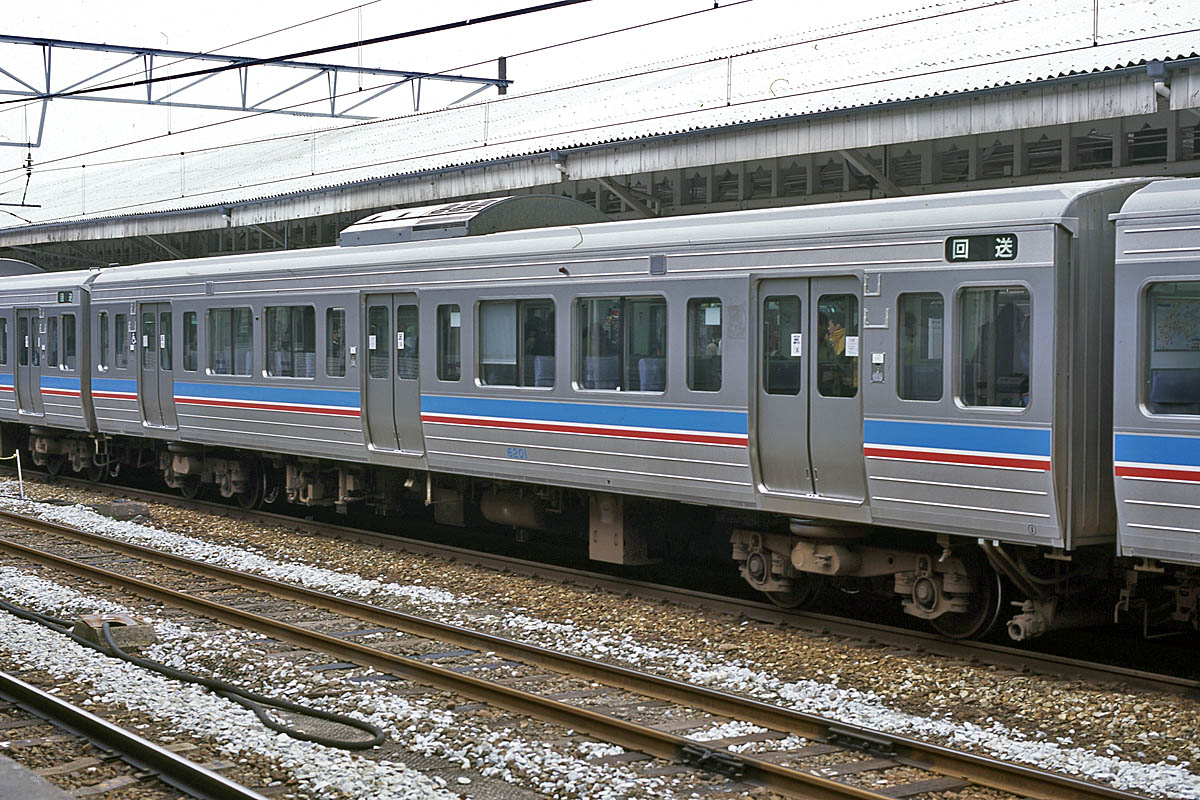
6201

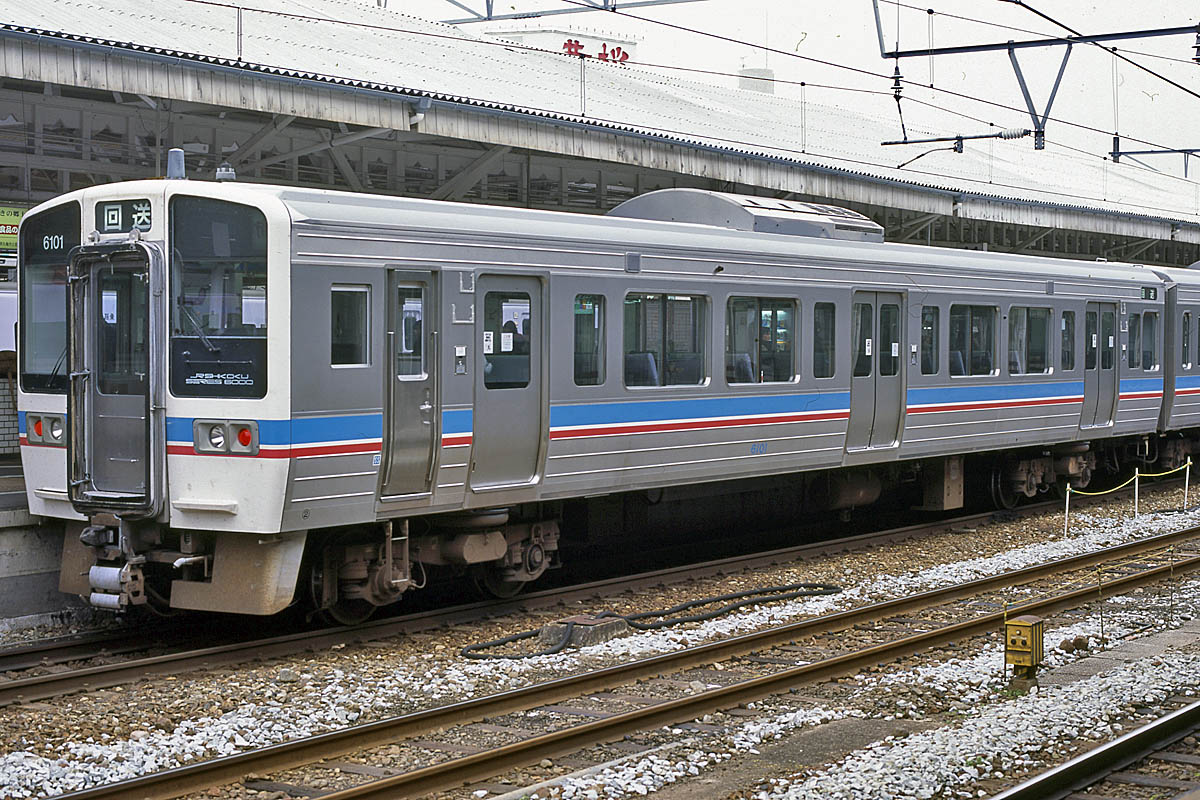
6101

== Bogies ==
The motored 6000 cars are mounted on bolsterless S-DT62 bogies, and the non-powered 6100 and 6200 trailer cars are mounted on S-TR62 bogies.

== Interior ==
Seating accommodation consists of transverse seating with backs that can be flipped over to face the direction of travel.

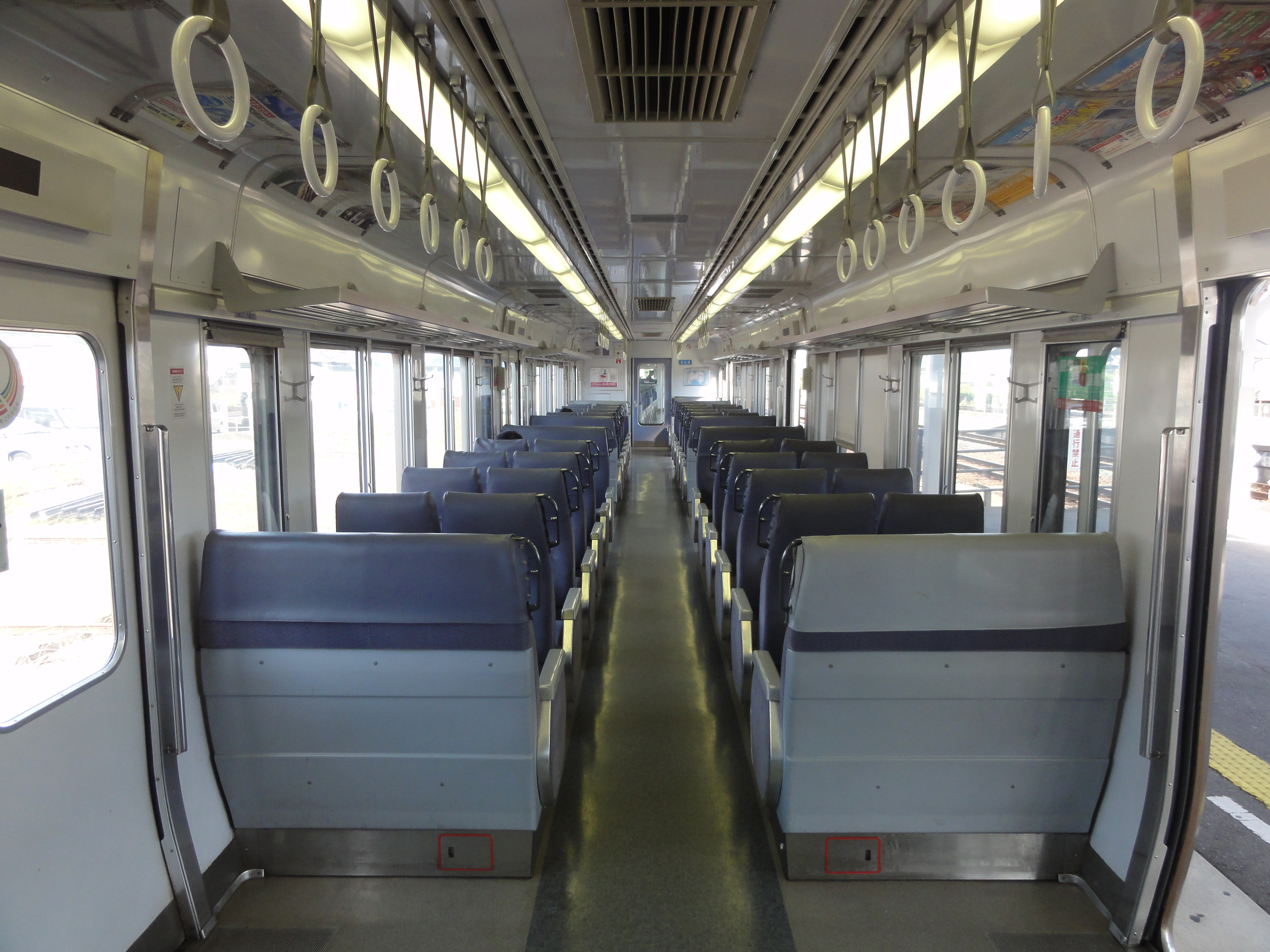
Interior view

== History ==
The two trains were delivered from Nippon Sharyo in March 1996, and entered revenue service on 26 April 1996.
