= Yoshikawa Station (Saitama) =

Railway station in Yoshikawa, Saitama Prefecture, Japan

JM20 Yoshikawa Station 吉川駅
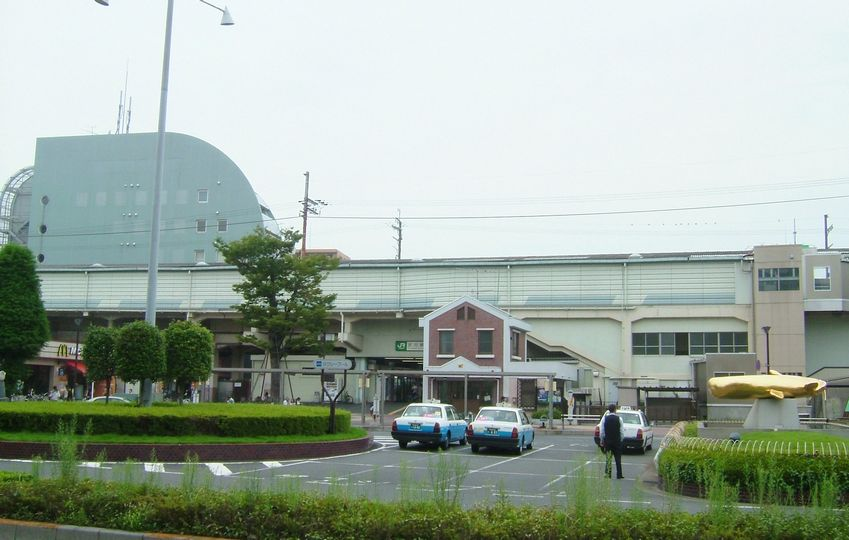
- Yoshikawa Station south forecourt in September 2008

General information
- Location: 1 Kiuri, Yoshikawa-shi, Saitama-ken 342-0045; Japan
- Coordinates: 35°52′35.7348″N 139°50′37.37″E
- Operator: JR East
- Line: Musashino Line
- Distance: 48.2 km from Fuchūhommachi
- Platforms: 2 side platforms
- Tracks: 2
- Connections: Bus stop

Other information
- Status: Staffed
- Station code: JM20
- Website: Official website

History
- Opened: 1 April 1973

Passengers
- FY2019: 17,186 daily

Services
Preceding station	JR East	Following station
Koshigaya-Laketown JM21 towards Ōmiya	Shimōsa	Yoshikawaminami JM19 towards Kaihimmakuhari
Koshigaya-Laketown JM21 towards Fuchūhommachi	Musashino Line	Yoshikawaminami JM19 towards Kaihimmakuhari or Tokyo
Location
- Location within Saitama Prefecture Location within Japan

Yoshikawa Station (吉川駅, Yoshikawa-eki) is a passenger railway station located in the city of Yoshikawa, Saitama, Japan, operated by the East Japan Railway Company (JR East).

== Lines ==
Yoshikawa Station is served by the orbital Musashino Line between Fuchūhommachi and Nishi-Funabashi, with some trains continuing to Tokyo via the Keiyō Line. It is located 48.2 kilometers from Fuchūhommachi Station and 77.0 kilometers from the official starting point of the line at Tsurumi Station.

== Station layout ==
The station consists of two elevated side platforms serving two tracks, with the station building located underneath. The station is staffed.

=== Platforms ===
1	Musashino Line	for Minami-Koshigaya, Musashi-Urawa, Nishi-Kokubunji and Fuchūhommachi
2	Musashino Line	for Shim-Matsudo, Nishi-Funabashi, Tokyo, and Kaihimmakuhari

== History ==
The station opened on 1 April 1973.

== Passenger statistics ==
In fiscal 2019, the station was used by an average of 17,986 passengers daily (boarding passengers only).

== Surrounding area ==
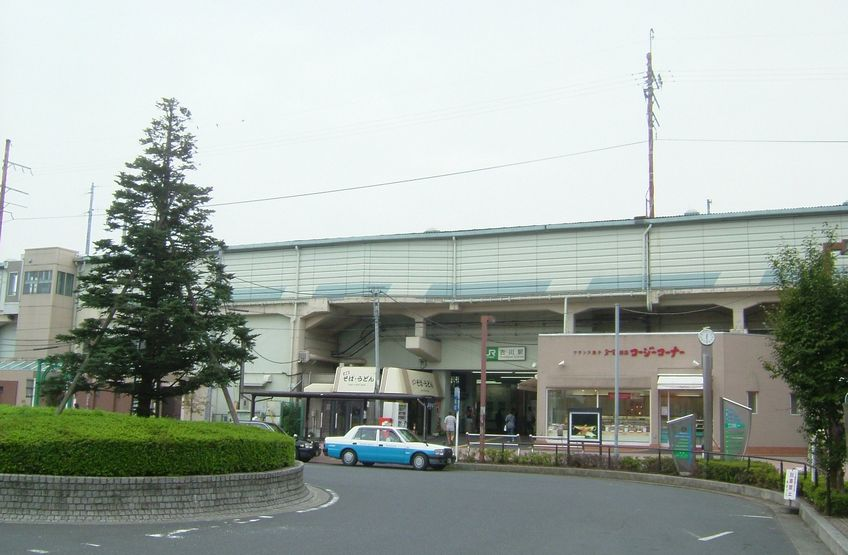
The north side of the station in September 2008

- Yoshikawa Police Station
- Yoshikawa City Office
- Saitama Yoshikawa High School

== See also ==
- List of railway stations in Japan
