= Shim-Misato Station =

Railway station in Misato, Saitama Prefecture, Japan

JM18 Shim-Misato Station 新三郷駅
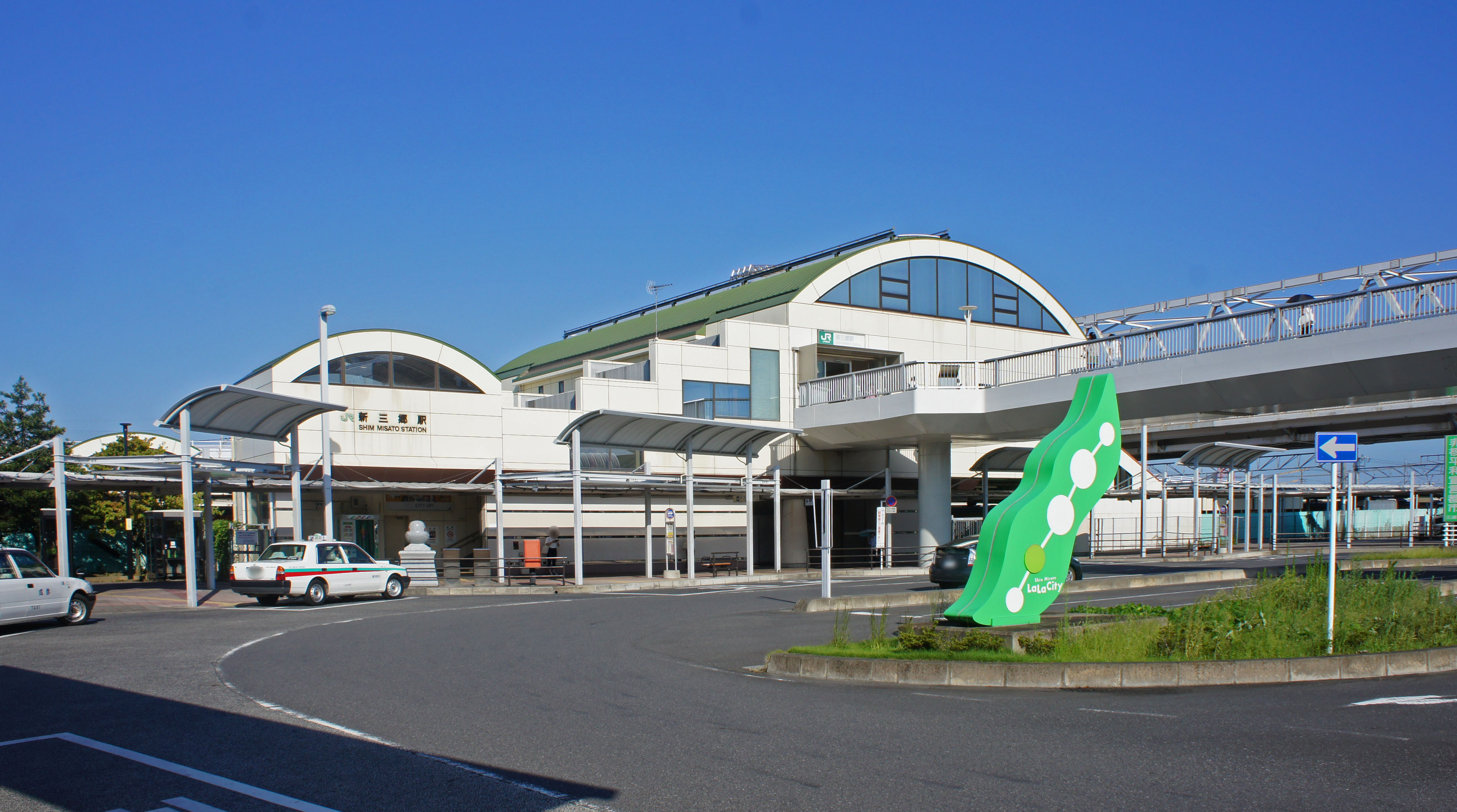
- West side in November 2019

General information
- Location: Shim-Misato Lala City 2-chome, Misato-shi, Saitama-ken 341–0009; Japan
- Coordinates: 35°51′31.26″N 139°52′9.65″E
- Operator: JR East
- Line: ■ Musashino Line
- Platforms: 2 side platforms
- Connections: Bus terminal

Other information
- Status: Staffed
- Station code: JM18
- Website: Official website

History
- Opened: 14 March 1985

Passengers
- FY2019: 15,502 daily

Services
| Preceding station | JR East | Following station |
|---|---|---|
| Yoshikawaminami JM19 towards Ōmiya | Shimōsa | Misato JM17 towards Kaihimmakuhari |
| Yoshikawaminami JM19 towards Fuchūhommachi | Musashino Line | Misato JM17 towards Kaihimmakuhari or Tokyo |
Location
- Location within Saitama Prefecture Location within Japan

Shim-Misato Station (新三郷駅, Shin-Misato-eki) is a passenger railway station located in the city of Misato, Saitama, Japan, operated by East Japan Railway Company (JR East).

== Lines ==
Shim-Misato Station is served by the orbital Musashino Line from Fuchūhommachi to Nishi-Funabashi and Tokyo. It is located 51.3 kilometers from Fuchūhommachi Station and 80.1 kilometers from the official starting point of the line (for freight operations) at Tsurumi Station.

== Station layout ==
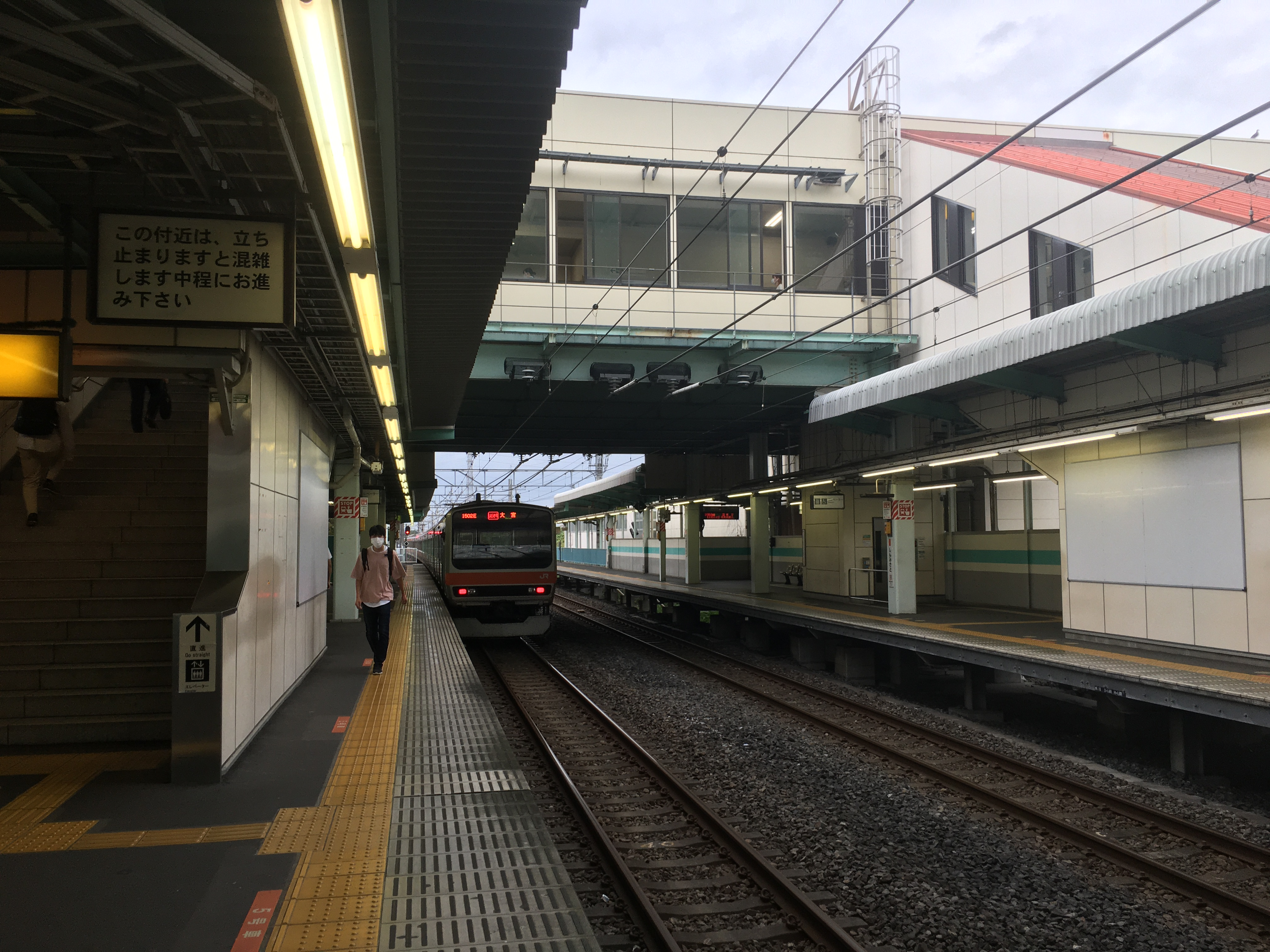
View of the platforms, September 2021

The station consists of two opposed side platforms serving two tracks, connected by a footbridge. The station is staffed.

=== Platforms ===
| 1 | Musashino Line | for Shim-Matsudo, Nishi-Funabashi, Tokyo, and Kaihimmakuhari |
| 2 | Musashino Line | for Minami-Koshigaya, Musashi-Urawa, Nishi-Kokubunji, and Fuchūhommachi |

== History ==
The station opened on 14 March 1985.

== Passenger statistics ==
In fiscal 2019, the station was used by an average of 15,502 passengers daily (boarding passengers only).

The passenger figures (boarding passengers only) for previous years are as shown below.

| Fiscal year | Daily average |
|---|---|
| 2000 | 11,523 |
| 2005 | 11,992 |
| 2010 | 16,504 |
| 2015 | 15,971 |

== Surrounding area ==
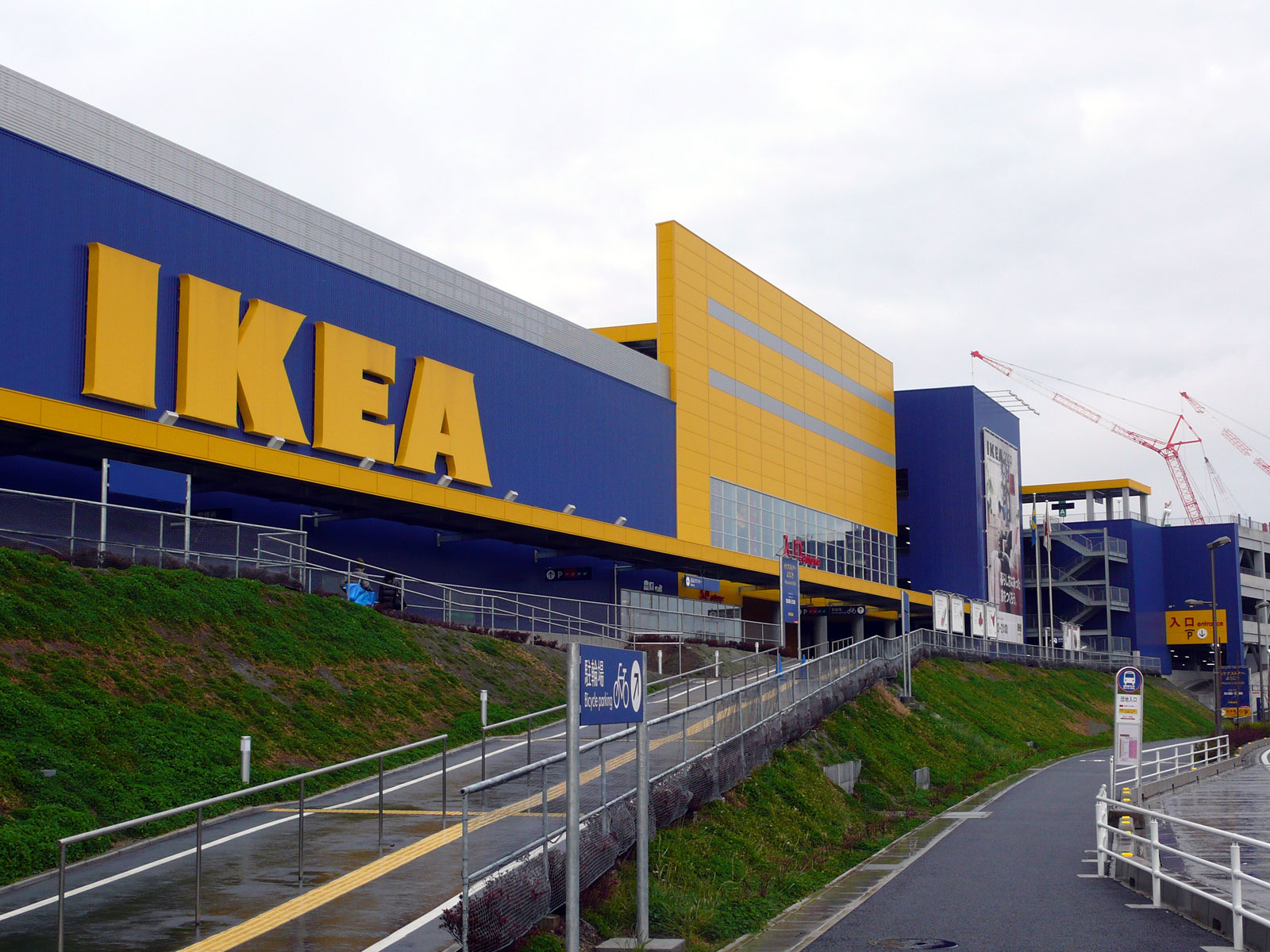
IKEA Shin-Misato

Shim-Misato Station was formerly adjacent to the Musashino Marshalling Yard. However, this closed in 1986, and the land was redeveloped.

- IKEA Shin-Misato
- Costco Shin-Misato
- Lalaport Shin-Misato shopping mall (since September 2009)

== See also ==
- List of railway stations in Japan
