= Misato, Saitama (city) =

Misato 三郷市
- City
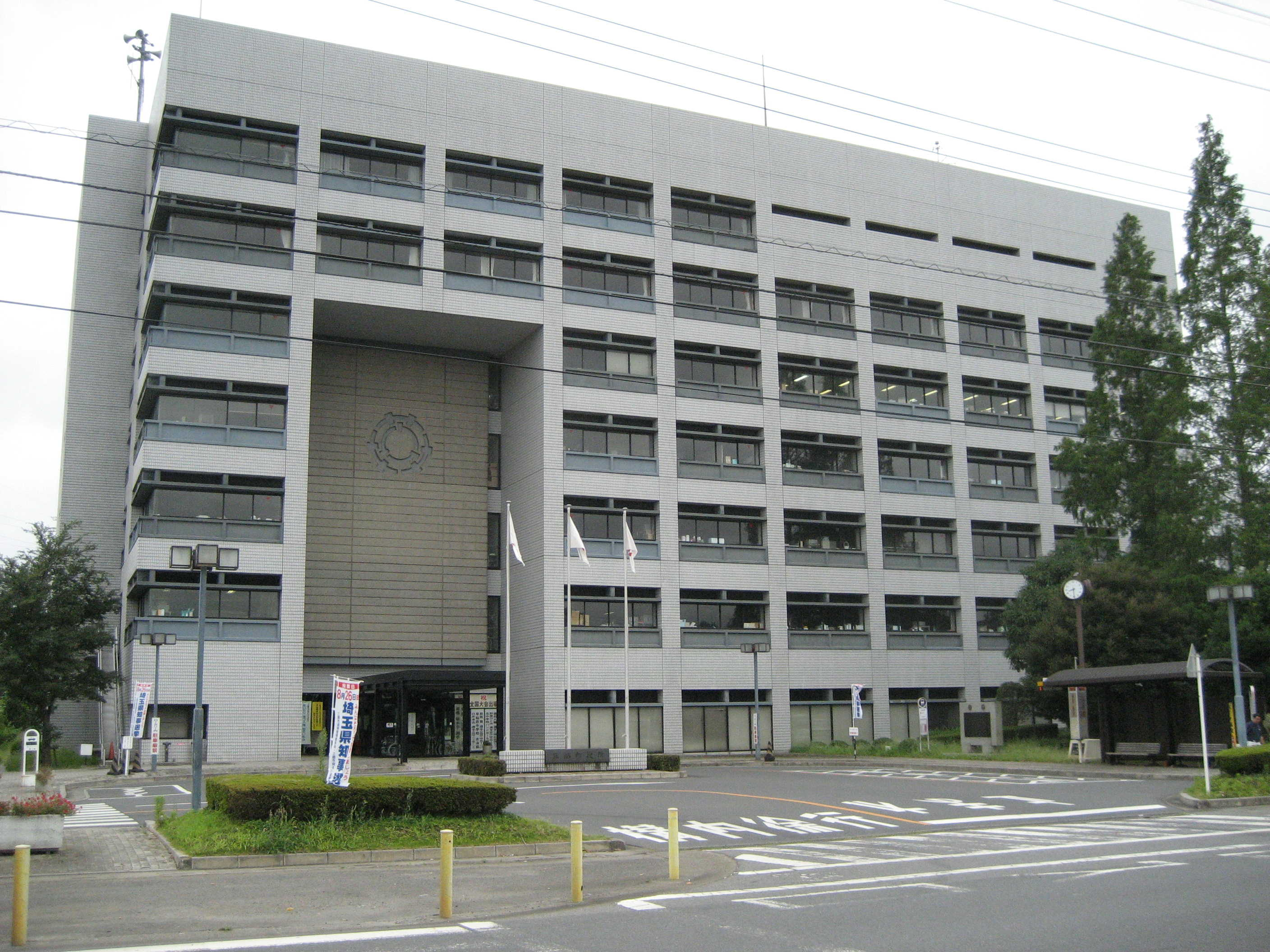
- Misato City Hall

- Flag Seal

- Location of Misato in Saitama Prefecture

- Location within Japan
- Coordinates: 35°49′48.5″N 139°52′20.4″E
- Country: Japan
- Region: Kantō
- Prefecture: Saitama
- First official recorded: mid 3rd century AD (official)
- Town settled: October 1, 1964
- City settled: May 3, 1972

Government
  - Mayor: Masaaki Kizu (from November 2006)

Area
  - Total: 30.13 km^{2} (11.63 sq mi)

Population (February 2021)
  - Total: 142,835
  - Density: 4,741/km^{2} (12,280/sq mi)
- Time zone: UTC+9 (Japan Standard Time)
- Tree: Castanopsis
- Flower: Rhododendron
- Bird: Tachybaptus ruficollis
- Phone number: 048-953-1111
- Address: 648-1 Hanawada, Misato-shi, Saitama-ken 341-8501
- Website: Official website

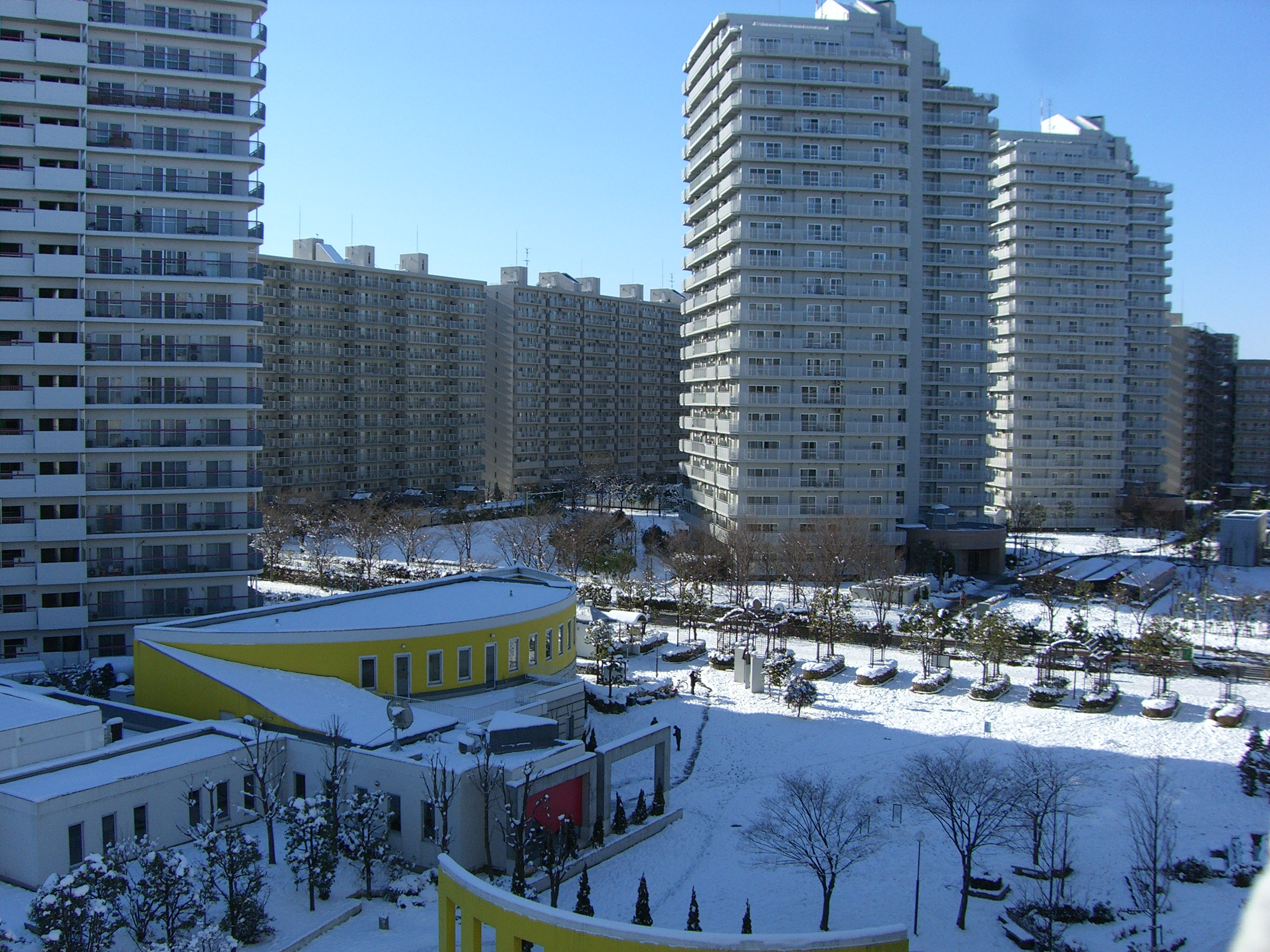
Housing complex in Misato

Misato (三郷市, Misato-shi) is a city located in Saitama Prefecture, Japan. As of 1 January 2021, the city had an estimated population of 142,835 in 65,950 households and a population density of 4700 persons per km^{2}. The total area of the city is 30.13 square kilometres (11.63 sq mi).

== Geography ==
Misato is located in the extreme southeastern corner Saitama Prefecture. The Edogawa River runs along the eastern border of the city, the Naka River runs along the western border, and the Oba River runs through the central part of the city. Located in the middle of the Kantō Plain, the land is generally flat, with the highest point being about 8 meters above sea level. The city is approximately 20 kilometers from downtown Tokyo.

=== Surrounding municipalities ===
Chiba Prefecture

- Matsudo
- Nagareyama

Saitama Prefecture

- Sōka
- Yashio
- Yoshikawa

Tokyo Metropolis

- Katsushika-ku

=== Climate ===
Misato has a humid subtropical climate (Köppen Cfa) characterized by warm summers and cool winters with light to no snowfall. The average annual temperature in Misato is 15.1 °C. The average annual rainfall is 1387 mm with September as the wettest month. The temperatures are highest on average in August, at around 26.9 °C, and lowest in January, at around 4.4 °C.

== Demographics ==
Per Japanese census data, the population of Misato expanded rapidly in the late 20th century and has grown at a slower pace in the 21st.

Historical population
Year	Pop.	±%
1920	12,825	—
1930	13,317	+3.8%
1940	14,476	+8.7%
1950	16,711	+15.4%
1960	17,735	+6.1%
1970	42,753	+141.1%
1980	98,223	+129.7%
1990	128,376	+30.7%
2000	131,047	+2.1%
2010	131,415	+0.3%
2020	142,145	+8.2%

== History ==
The area of modern Misato was originally part of Shimōsa Province. In 1683, it was transferred to Musashi Province.

In April 1889, the villages of Hikonari, Waseda, Togasaki and Yagisato were created within Kitakatsushika District, Saitama with the establishment of the modern municipalities system. In July 1933, Togasaki and Yagisato merged to form the village of Towa.

In September 1956, Hikonari, Waseda and Towa merged to form the village of Misato, which was raised to town status in October 1964. The area experienced rapid population growth in the 1960s and 1970s with the large-scale construction of public housing new town developments.

It is also the birthplace of Junko Furuta, the victim of a high-profile murder.

In May 1972, Misato was elevated to city status.

== Government ==
Misato has a mayor-council form of government with a directly elected mayor and a unicameral city council of 22 members. Misato contributes two members to the Saitama Prefectural Assembly. In terms of national politics, the city is part of Saitama 14th district of the lower house of the Diet of Japan.

== Economy ==
Due to this location, Misato is primarily a bedroom community with a significant percentage of its population commuting to the Tokyo metropolis for work.

== Education ==
Misato has 19 public elementary schools and eight public middle schools operated by the city government and three public high schools (Misato North High School, Misato Technical High School, Misato High School) operated by the Saitama Prefectural Board of Education, The prefecture also operates one special education school for the handicapped.

== Transportation ==
=== Railway ===
JR East – Musashino Line

- Misato - Shin-Misato

Metropolitan Intercity Railway Company - Tsukuba Express

- Misato-chūō

=== Highway ===
- Shuto Expressway Misato Route
- Tokyo Gaikan Expressway
- Jōban Expressway
- National Route 298

== Noted people from Misato ==
- Shiori Fukuda, professional soccer player
- Junko Furuta, murder victim
- Mika Kikuchi, actress
- Tomoyuki Sakai, professional soccer player
- Yūya Uchida, voice actress
- Mayu Watanabe, retired actress, singer, model etc
- Shunketsu Yūji, sumo wrestler
