= Musashino Line =

Railway line in Japan

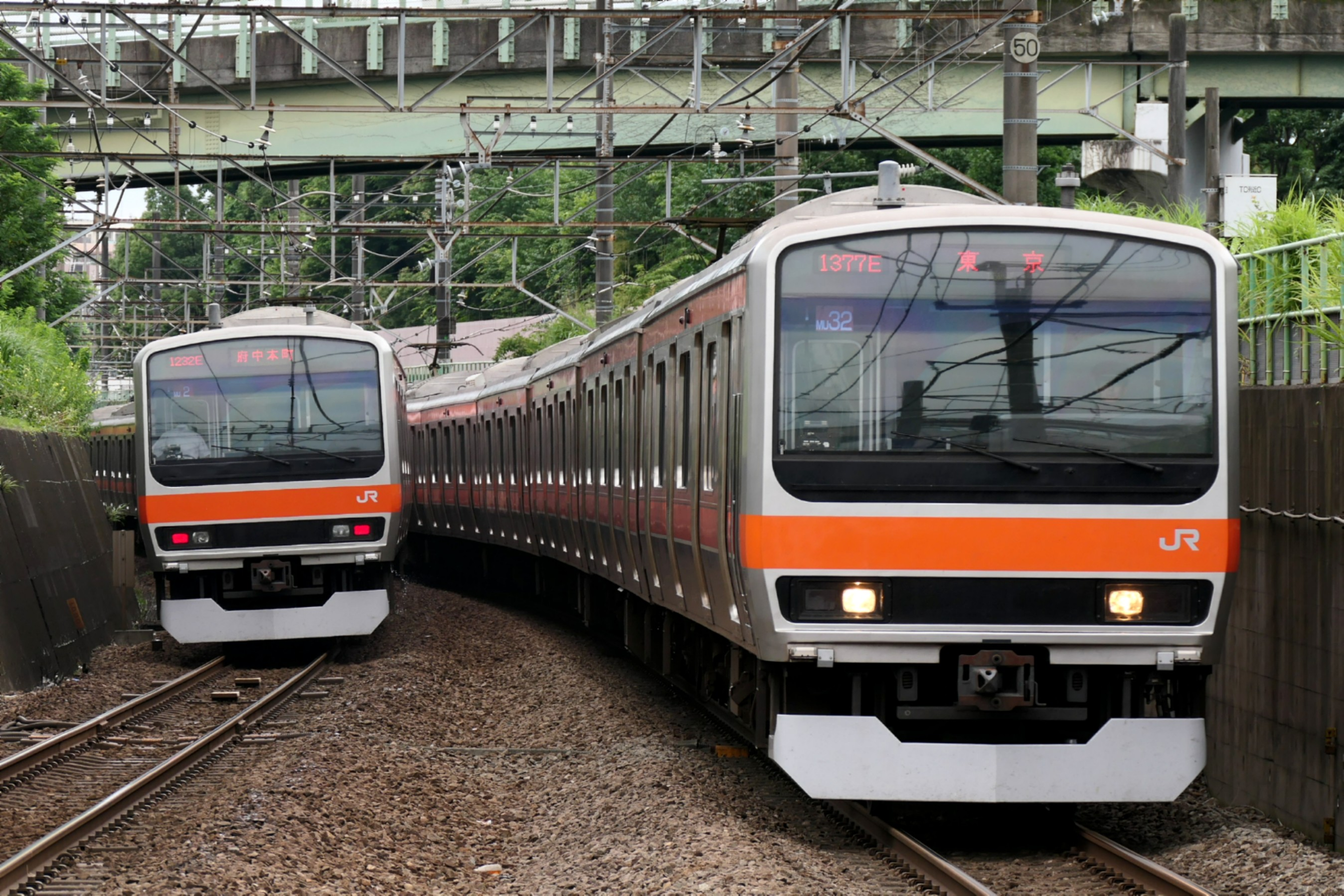
- Musashino Line E231 series EMUs, November 2019

Overview
- Native name: 武蔵野線
- Owner: JR East
- Locale: Tokyo, Kanagawa, Saitama, Chiba prefectures
- Termini: Fuchūhommachi; Nishi-Funabashi
- Stations: 26

Service
- Type: Heavy rail
- Operator(s): JR East, JR Freight
- Depot(s): Keiyo
- Rolling stock: 209-500 series, E231-0 series, E231-900 series EMUs
- Daily ridership: 1,064,613 (daily 2015)

History
- Opened: April 1, 1973; 52 years ago

Technical
- Line length: 71.8 km (44.6 mi) (passenger operations); 100.6 km (62.5 mi) (Total)
- Track gauge: 1,067 mm (3 ft 6 in)
- Electrification: 1,500 V DC overhead catenary
Route map
Route map of passenger service, with red denoting the Musashino Line and blue denoting the Keiyo Line
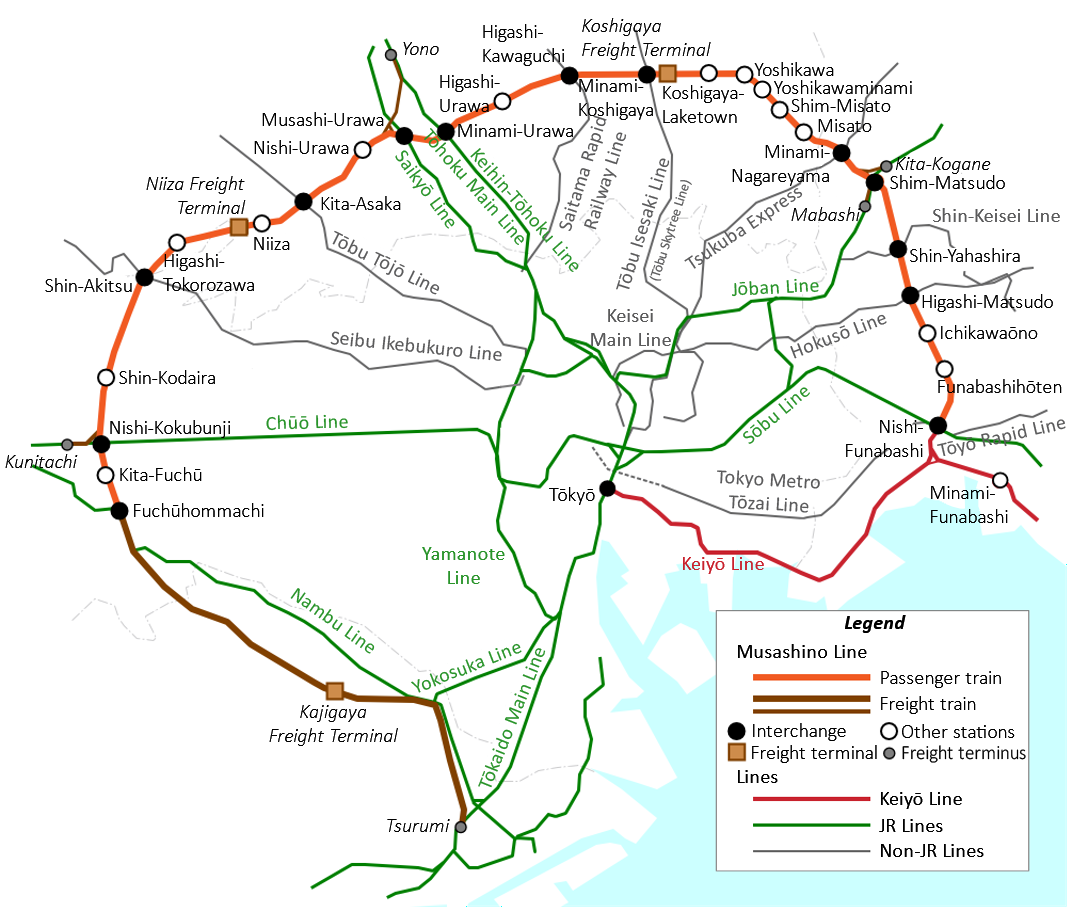
Connections of the Musashino Line and the Musashino Freight Line

The Musashino Line (武蔵野線, Musashino-sen) is a railway line operated by the East Japan Railway Company (JR East). It links Tsurumi Station in Yokohama with Nishi-Funabashi Station in Chiba Prefecture, forming a 100.6 km (62.5 mi) unclosed loop around central Tokyo. Passenger operations are limited to the 71.8 km (44.6 mi) portion between Fuchūhommachi and Nishi-Funabashi; the Tsurumi to Fuchūhommachi portion, called the "Musashino South Line", is normally used only by freight trains. The line forms part of what JR East refers to as the "Tokyo Mega Loop" (Japanese: 東京メガループ) around Tokyo, consisting of the Keiyō Line, Musashino Line, Nambu Line, and Yokohama Line.

== Services ==
Most services on the Musashino Line are local trains making all stops. Some trains continue through the Keiyō Line past Nishi-Funabashi to Tokyo, Minami-Funabashi or Kaihimmakuhari.

Other services include:

- Musashino: services operated between Fuchūhommachi/Hachiōji and Ōmiya
- Shimōsa: services operated between Ōmiya and Nishi-Funabashi/Kaihimmakuhari
- Holiday Kaisoku Kamakura seasonal service between Minami-Koshigaya and Kamakura
- Burari Kamakura and Yokohama Bay Area seasonal service between Iwaki and Kamakura
- Burari Takao Sansaku seasonal service between Hitachi and Takao

== Station list ==
Tsurumi Station is considered to be the origin of the Musashino Line; trains going clockwise (toward Nishi-Funabashi) are therefore referred to as heading "down" (下り, kudari), while trains going counter-clockwise (toward Fuchūhommachi) are heading "up" (上り, nobori). This is often counterintuitive, as it results in through trains to Tokyo being labeled and numbered as "down" trains while on the Musashino Line; however, such trains switch to "up" after joining the Keiyō Line.

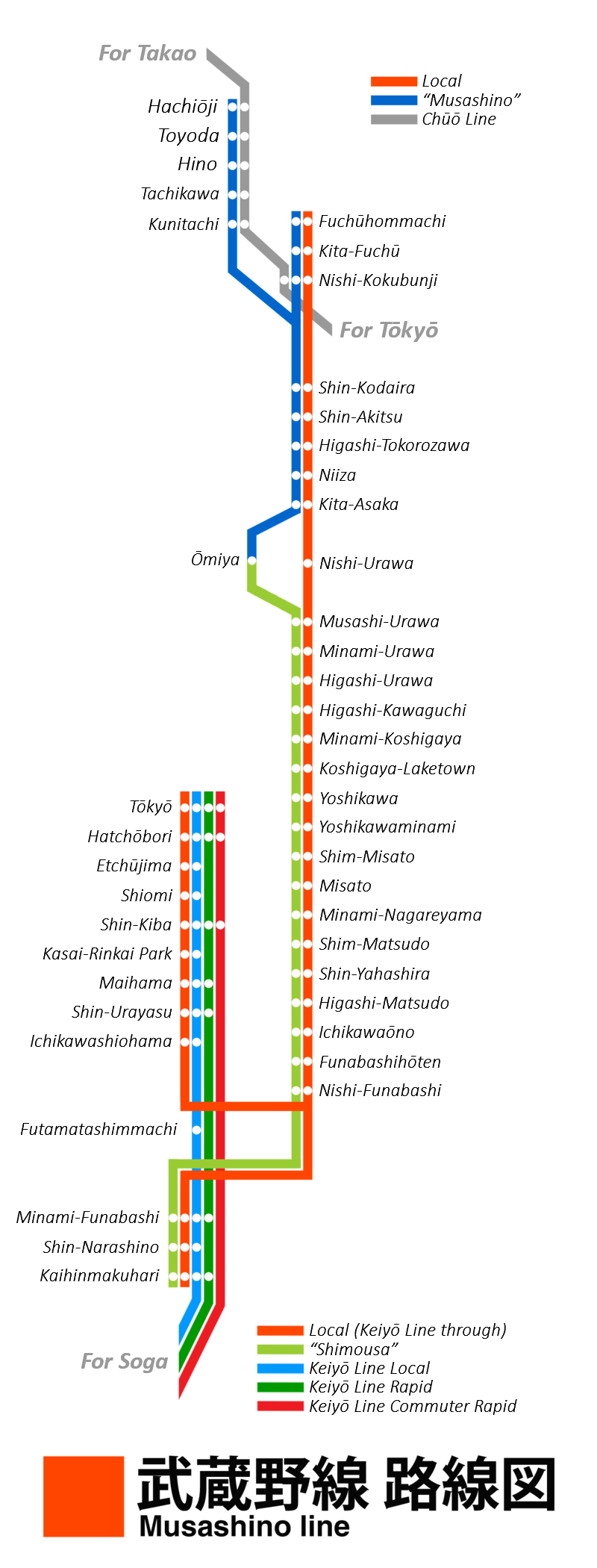
Musashino Line service diagram, including Shimousa and Musashino services

All eastbound (for Nishi-Funabashi) passenger trains begin service at Fuchū-Hommachi Station. Details of the Musashino South Line and other branch lines, which are freight-only sections, can be found below the passenger station list.

=== Musashino Line (passenger) ===
No.	Name	Japanese	Distance (km)		Transfers	Location	
No.	Name	Japanese	Between stations	Total	Transfers	Location	
JM35	Fuchūhommachi	府中本町	-	0.0	Nambu Line (JN20), Musashino South Line (Freight)	Fuchū	Tokyo
JM34	Kita-Fuchū	北府中	1.7	1.7		Fuchū	Tokyo
JM33	Nishi-Kokubunji	西国分寺	2.2	3.9	Chūō Line (JC17)	Kokubunji	Tokyo
JM32	Shin-Kodaira	新小平	3.5	7.4	Tamako Line (Ōmekaidō: ST03) (Note: Ōmekaidō Station is approximately 10 minutes walk from Shin-Kodaira Station.); Musashino Line (Kunitachi Freight Branch)	Kodaira	Tokyo
JM31	Shin-Akitsu	新秋津	5.6	13.0	Ikebukuro Line (Akitsu: SI16)	Higashimurayama	Tokyo
JM30	Higashi-Tokorozawa	東所沢	2.7	15.7		Tokorozawa	Saitama
—N/a	Niiza Freight Terminal	新座貨物ターミナル駅	3.7	19.4		Niiza	Saitama
JM29	Niiza	新座	0.3	19.7		Niiza	Saitama
JM28	Kita-Asaka	北朝霞	3.1	22.8	Tojo Line (Asakadai: TJ13)	Asaka	Saitama
JM27	Nishi-Urawa	西浦和	5.0	27.8	Musashino Line (Ōmiya Freight Branch)	Sakura-ku, Saitama	Saitama
JM26	Musashi-Urawa	武蔵浦和	2.0	29.8	Saikyō Line (JA21); Musashino Line (Nishi-Urawa Freight Branch)	Minami-ku, Saitama	Saitama
JM25	Minami-Urawa	南浦和	1.9	31.7	Keihin–Tōhoku Line (JK42)	Minami-ku, Saitama	Saitama
JM24	Higashi-Urawa	東浦和	3.7	35.4		Midori-ku, Saitama	Saitama
JM23	Higashi-Kawaguchi	東川口	3.8	39.2	Saitama Railway Line (SR25)	Kawaguchi	Saitama
JM22	Minami-Koshigaya	南越谷	4.3	43.5	Tobu Skytree Line (Shin-Koshigaya: TS20)	Koshigaya	Saitama
—N/a	Koshigaya Freight Terminal	越谷貨物ターミナル駅	0.4	43.9		Koshigaya	Saitama
JM21	Koshigaya-Laketown	越谷レイクタウン	2.4	46.3		Koshigaya	Saitama
JM20	Yoshikawa	吉川	1.9	48.2		Yoshikawa	Saitama
JM19	Yoshikawaminami	吉川美南	1.7	49.9		Yoshikawa	Saitama
JM18	Shim-Misato	新三郷	1.4	51.3		Misato	Saitama
JM17	Misato	三郷	2.1	53.4		Misato	Saitama
JM16	Minami-Nagareyama	南流山	2.0	55.4	Tsukuba Express (TX10); Musashino Line (Kita-Kogane, Mabashi Freight Branches)	Nagareyama	Chiba
JM15	Shim-Matsudo	新松戸	2.1	57.5	Jōban Line (Local) (JL25); Nagareyama Line (Kōya: RN2)	Matsudo	Chiba
JM14	Shin-Yahashira	新八柱	4.1	61.6	Matsudo Line (Yabashira: KS84)	Matsudo	Chiba
JM13	Higashi-Matsudo	東松戸	2.4	64.0	Hokusō Line (HS05); Narita Sky Access Line (HS05)	Matsudo	Chiba
JM12	Ichikawaōno	市川大野	1.9	65.9		Ichikawa	Chiba
JM11	Funabashihōten	船橋法典	3.0	68.9		Funabashi	Chiba
JM10	Nishi-Funabashi	西船橋	2.9	71.8	Keiyō Line (JM10; through to Tokyo or Kaihimmakuhari); Chūō–Sōbu Line (JB30); Tōzai Line (T-23); Tōyō Rapid Railway Line (TR01)	Funabashi	Chiba

=== Musashino Freight Branch Lines ===
Railway lines around Funabashi

Name	Japanese	Distance (km)		Transfers	Location	
Name	Japanese	Between stations	Total	Transfers	Location	
Musashino South Line
Tsurumi	鶴見	-	0.0	Tōkaidō Line, Keihin Tohoku Line, Tsurumi Line, Tokaido Freight Line, Takashima Freight Line	Tsurumi-ku, Yokohama	Kanagawa
Shin-Tsurumi Yard	新鶴見信号場	3.9	3.9	Hinkaku Line, Nambu Line Freight Branch (for Shitte)	Tsurumi-ku, Yokohama	Kanagawa
Kajigaya Freight Terminal	梶ヶ谷貨物ターミナル駅	8.8	12.7		Miyamae-ku, Kawasaki	Kanagawa
Fuchūhommachi	府中本町	16.1	28.8	Musashino Line (towards Nishi-Kokubunji), Nambu Line	Fuchū	Tokyo
Kunitachi Branch Line
Shin-Kodaira	新小平	-	0.0	Musashino Line (towards Nishi-Funabashi)	Kodaira	Tokyo
Kunitachi	国立	5.0	5.0	Chūō Line	Kunitachi	Tokyo
Omiya Branch Line
Nishi-Urawa	西浦和	‐	0.0	Musashino Line (towards Fuchūhommachi and Tsurumi)	Sakura-ku, Saitama	Saitama
Bessho Yard	別所信号場	1.3	1.3			Saitama
Yono	与野	3.6	4.9	Tohoku Main Line (Tohoku Freight Line)	Urawa-ku, Saitama	Saitama
Nishi-Urawa Branch Line
Musashi-Urawa	武蔵浦和	‐	‐	Musashino Line (towards Nishi-Funabashi)	Minami-ku, Saitama	Saitama
Bessho Yard	別所信号場	‐	‐	Musashino Line Omiya Branch Line	Minami-ku, Saitama	Saitama
Kita-Kogane Branch Line
Minami-Nagareyama	南流山	‐	0.0	Musashino Line (towards Fuchūhommachi and Tsurumi)	Nagareyama	Chiba
Kita-Kogane	北小金	2.9	2.9	Joban Line (towards Toride)	Matsudo	Chiba
Mabashi Branch Line
Minami-Nagareyama	南流山	‐	0.0	Musashino Line (towards Fuchūhommachi and Tsurumi)	Nagareyama	Chiba
Mabashi	馬橋	3.7	3.7	Joban Line (towards Mikawashima)	Matsudo	Chiba

== Rolling stock ==
- 209-500 series eight-car EMUs (since December 2010)
- E231-0 series eight-car EMUs (since November 2017)
- E231-900 series eight-car EMU (since 20 July 2020)

Three 209-500 series sets were transferred from the Keiyō Line in 2010-2011, where they were displaced by new E233-5000 series sets and reduced from ten to eight cars per set; eight additional sets were transferred from the Chūō–Sōbu Line in 2018-2019. Between 2017 and 2020, E231-0 series sets were transferred from the Chūō–Sōbu Line and the Jōban Line and reduced from ten to eight cars per set to replace the 205 series. In July 2020, the sole E231-900 series set was also transferred from the Chūō–Sōbu Line and reduced from ten to eight cars.

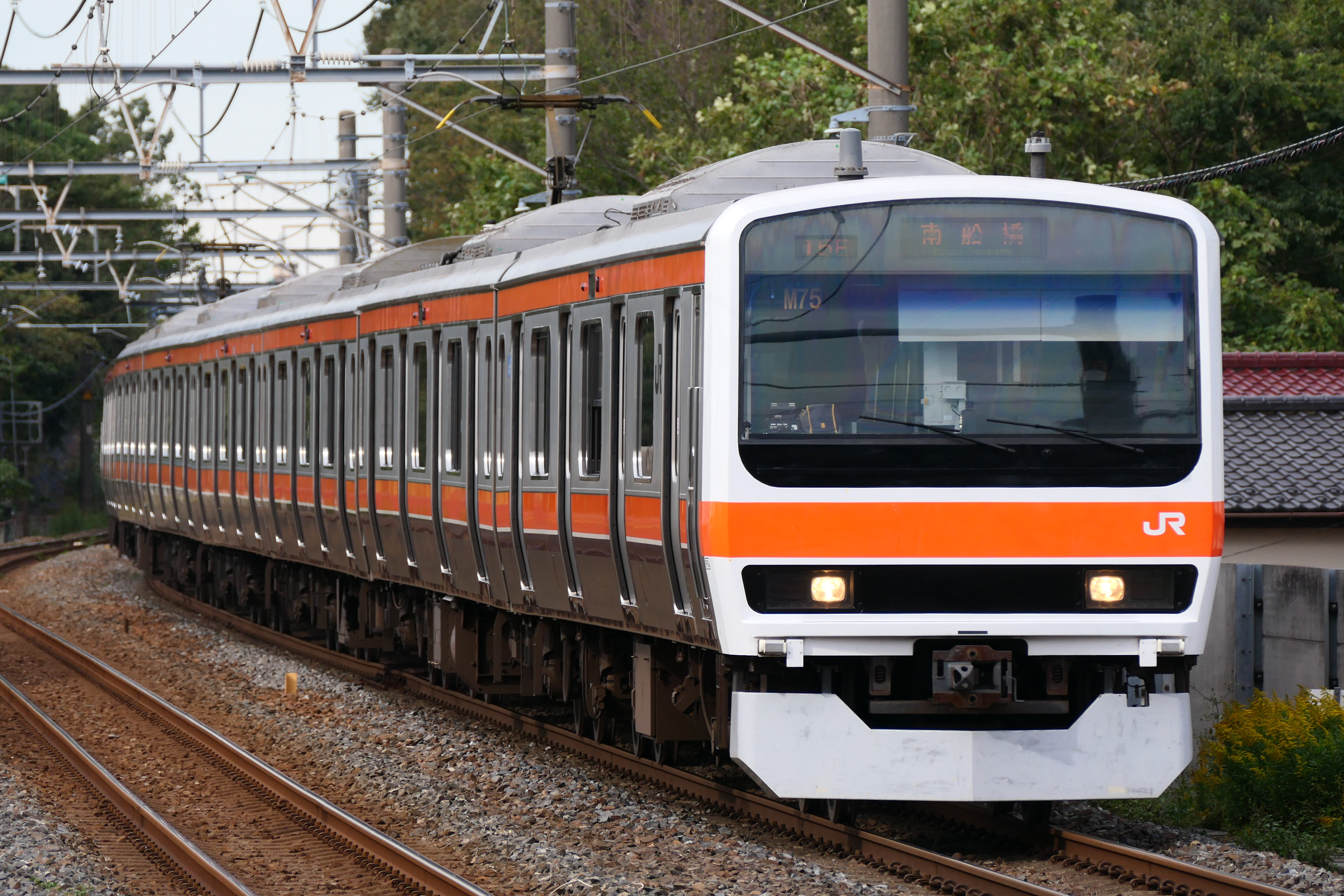
A Musashino Line 209-500 series EMU in October 2019

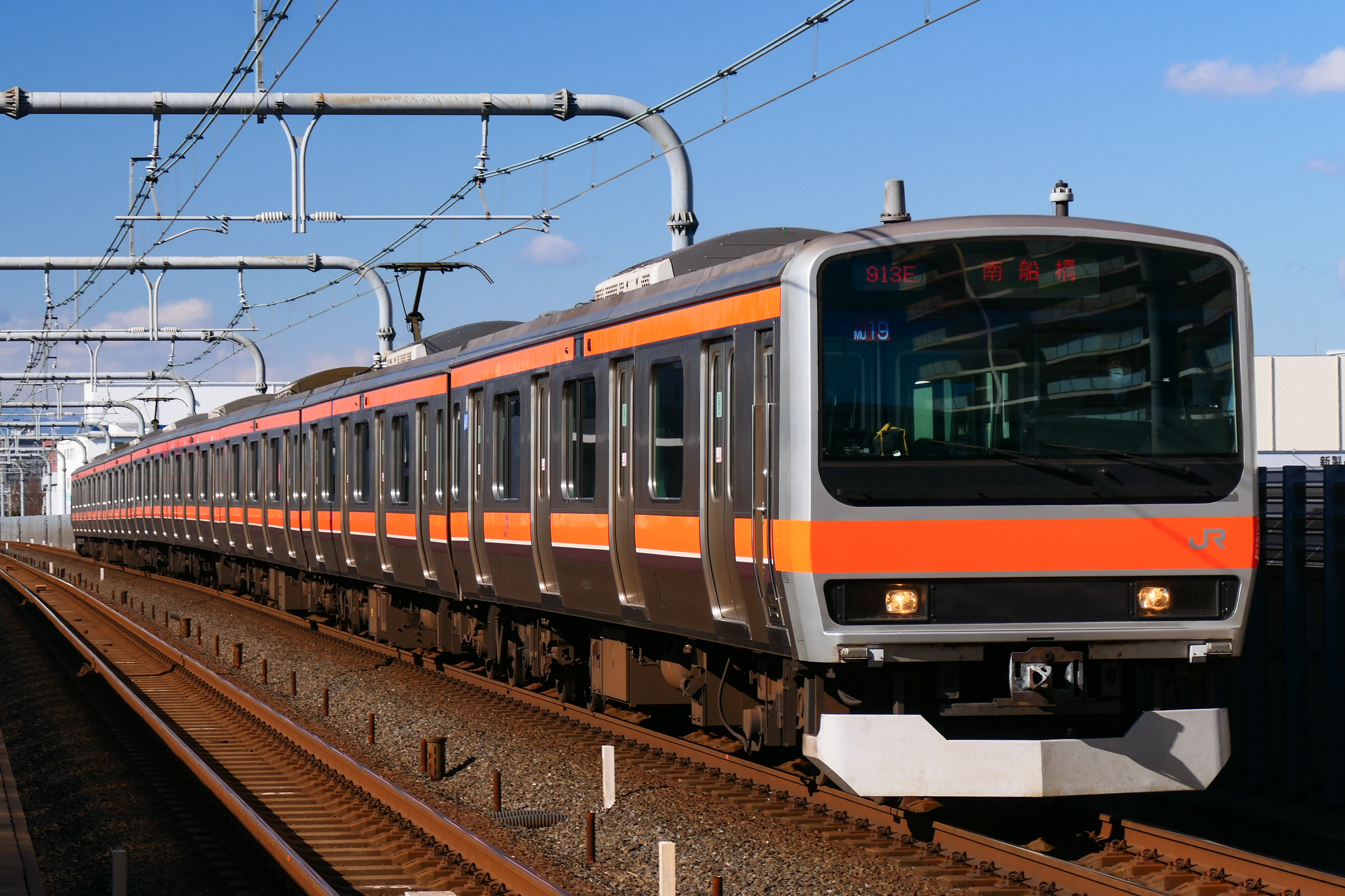
A Musashino Line E231-0 series EMU in January 2023

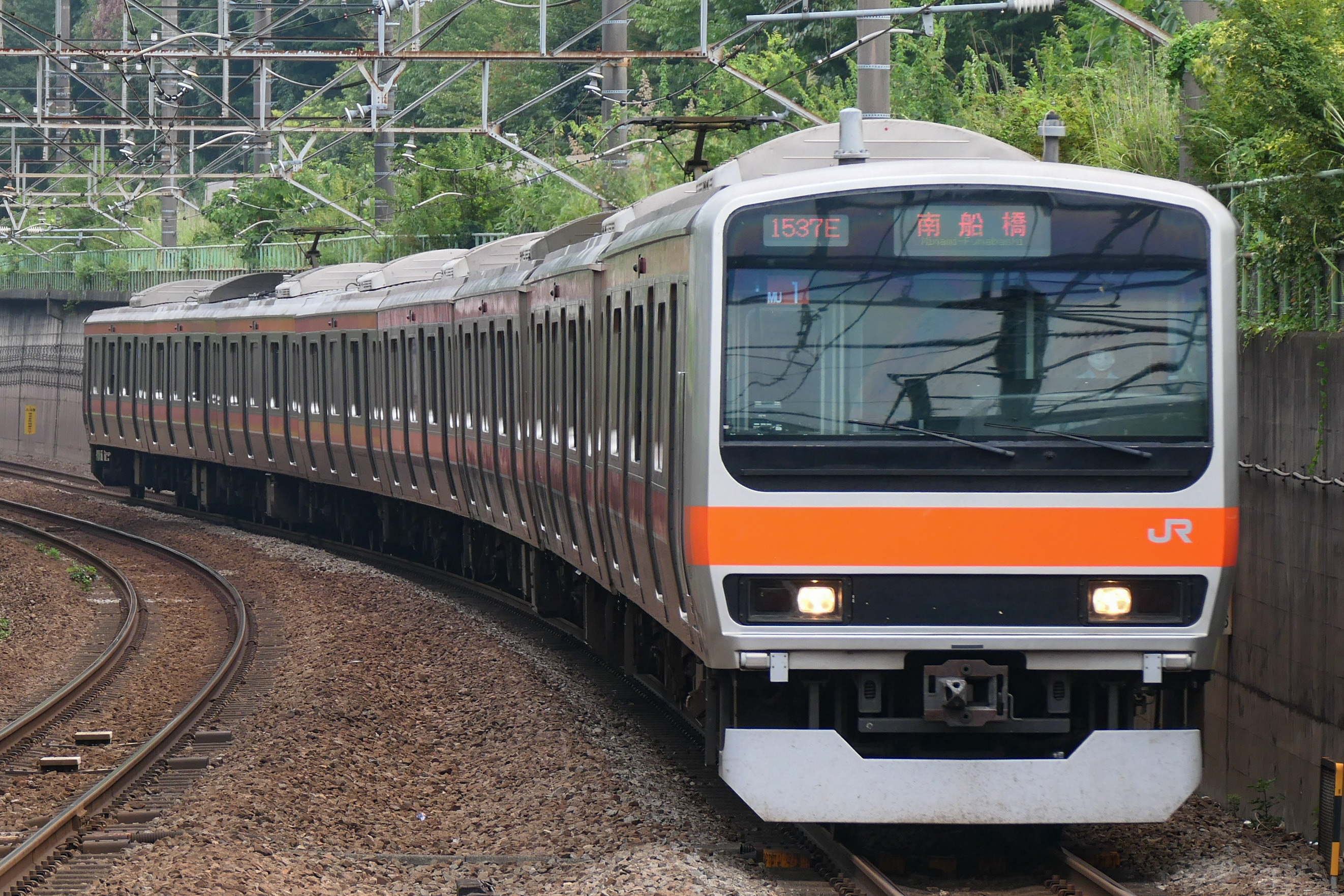
Musashino Line E231-900 series in August 2022

=== Former ===
- 101-1000 series 6-car EMUs (1 April 1973 - 26 October 1986)
- 103 series 6-car, later 8-car EMUs (June 1980 - 8 December 2005)
- 201 series 6-car EMUs (from 3 March 1986 - November 1996)
- 205-0 series 8-car EMUs (from December 1991 - October 2019)
- 205-5000 series 8-car EMUs (from 2002 - 19 October 2020)

165 and 169 series EMUs were used on Shinkansen Relay services and later Musashino rapid services until 2002. 115 series EMUs were used on Musashino services from 2002 until the services were downgraded to all-stations "Local" status in December 2010. The 205-0 series sets were built from new for the Musashino Line, entering service from 1 December 1991, and have six motored cars per eight-car set. These were the last 205 series sets to be built from new. The 205-5000 series sets were modified between 2002 and 2008 from displaced former Yamanote Line sets by adding new VVVF-controlled AC motors, and have four motored cars per eight-car set. 205 series trains, both 205-0 and 205-5000 series, were withdrawn from Musashino Line and currently operated in Indonesia.

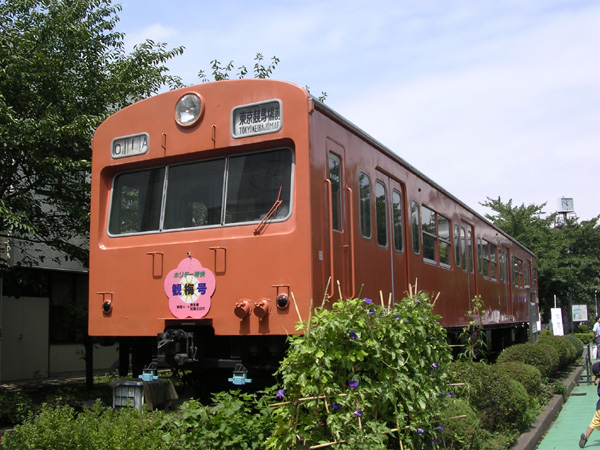
A 101 series EMU

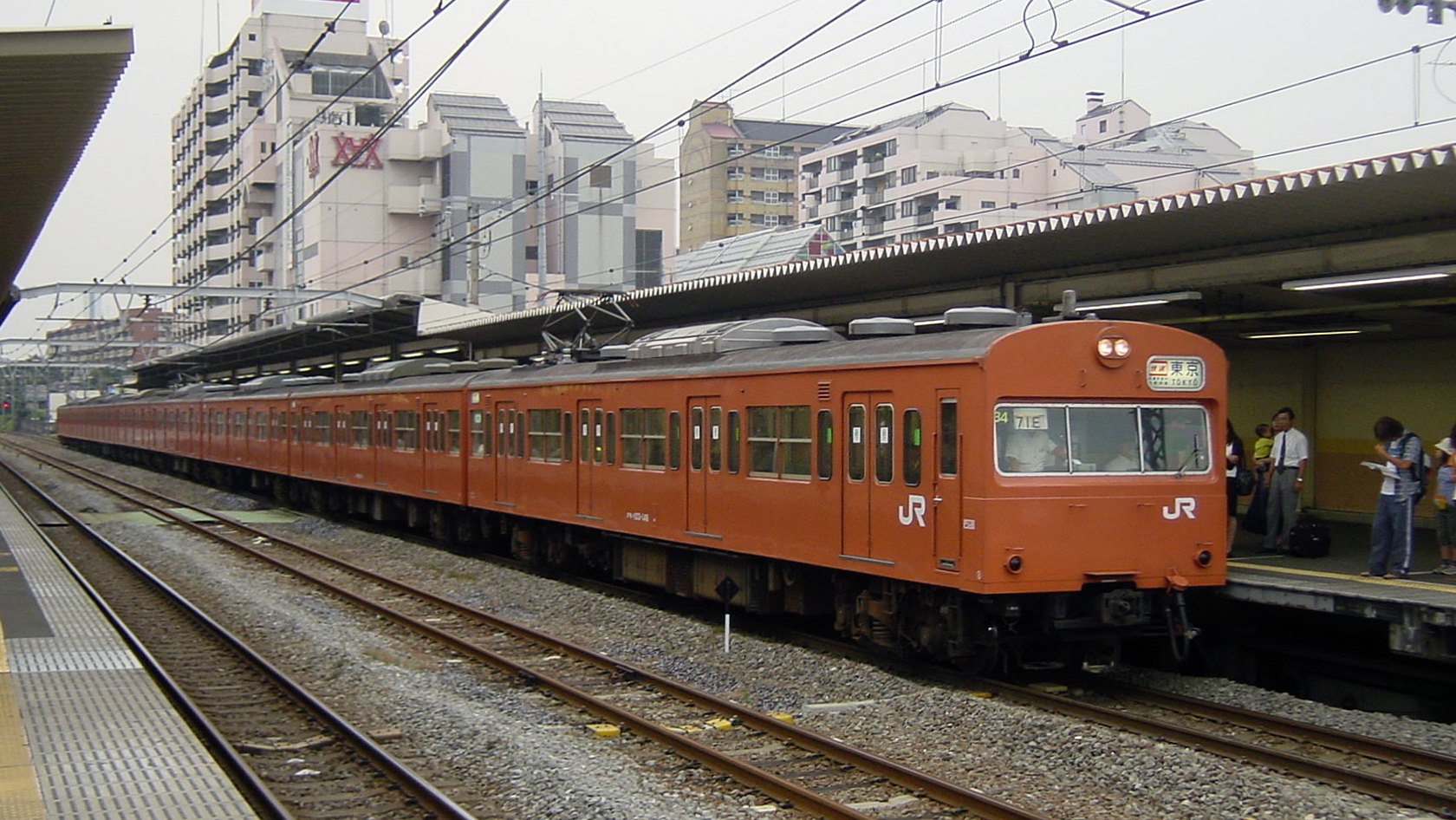
A Musashino Line 103 series (low-cab type) EMU, August 2001

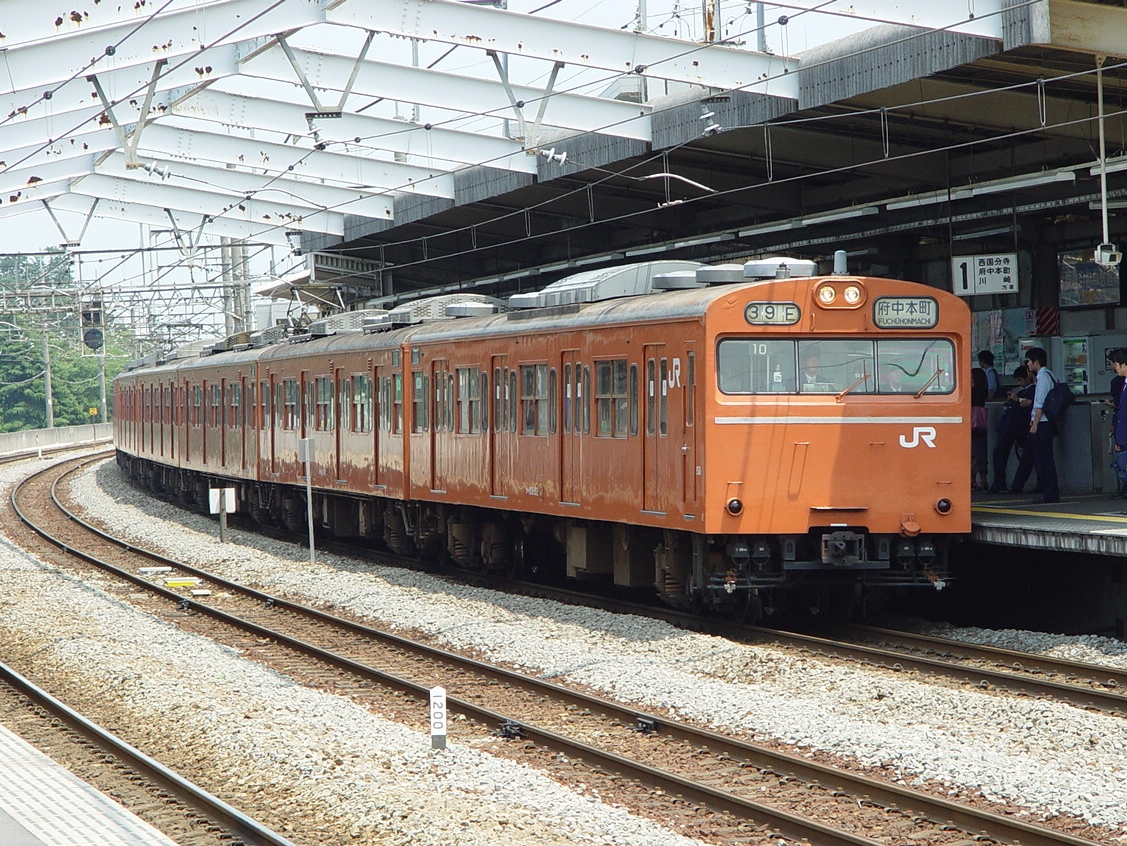
A Musashino Line 103 series EMU, May 2002

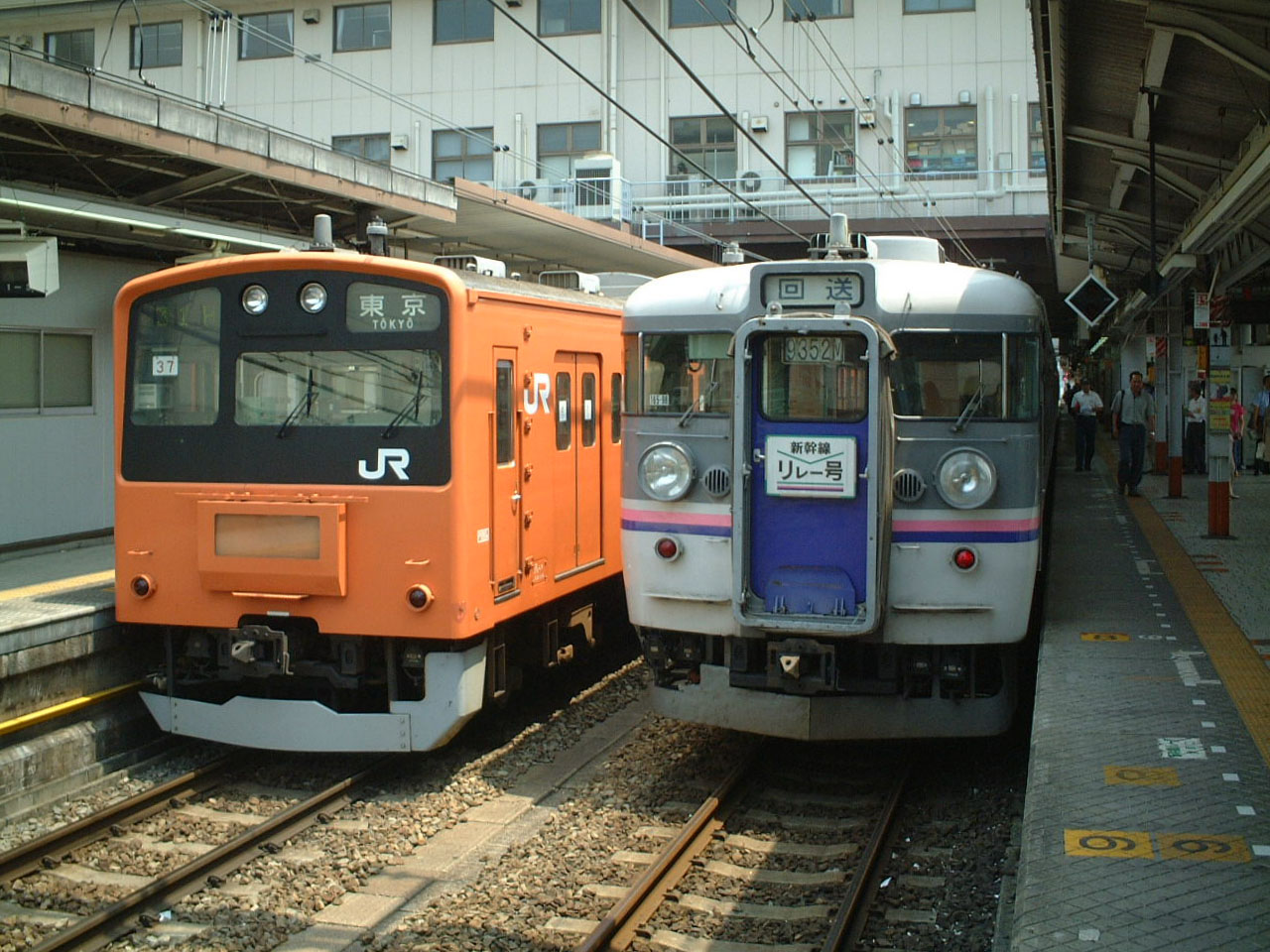
A 165 series EMU (right) on a Shinkansen Relay service, August 2001

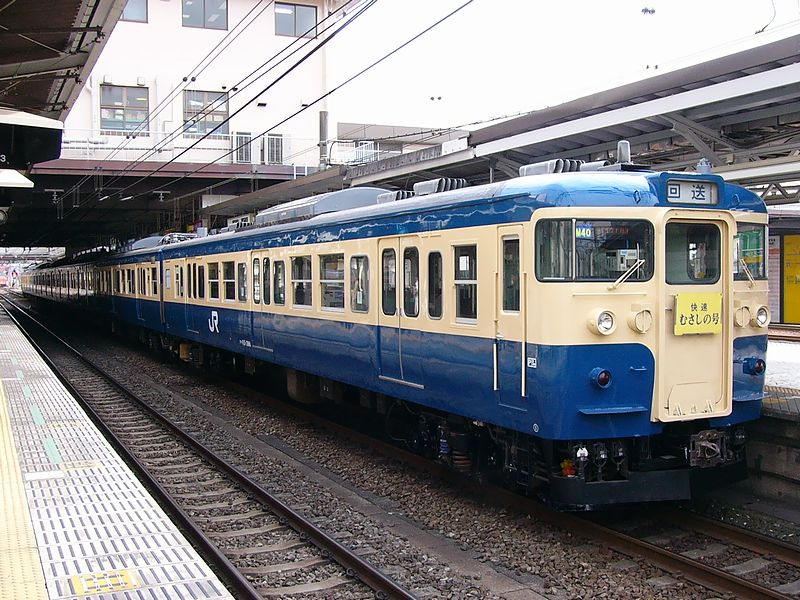
A 115-300 series EMU set on a Musashino service, March 2004

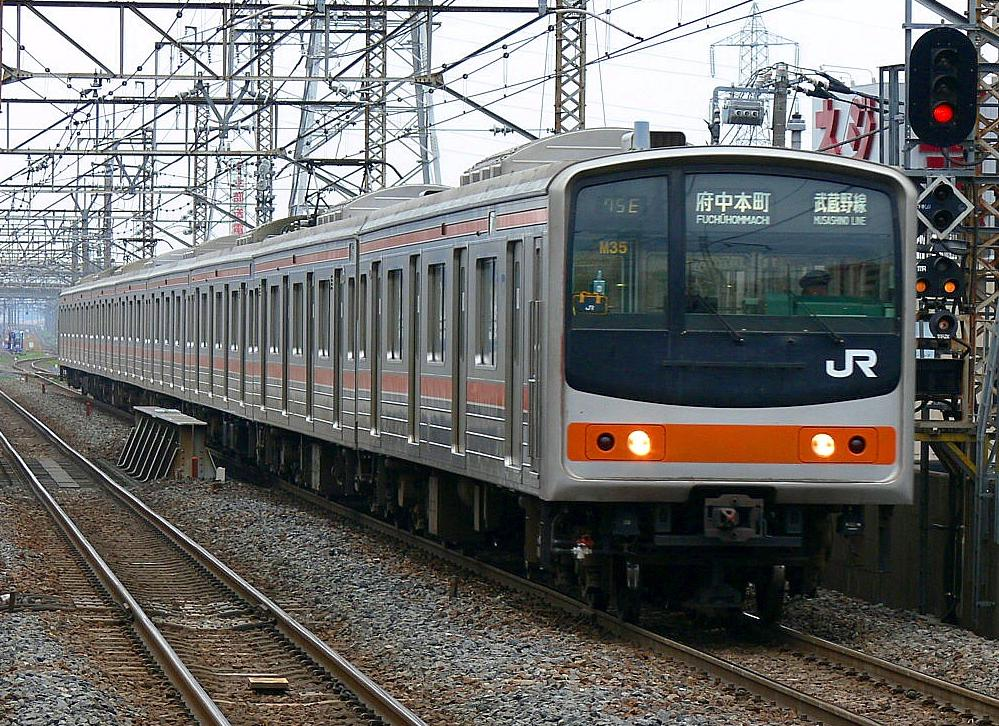
A Musashino Line 205-0 series EMU in June 2006 (this particular set is actually a 205-5000, or set 145 in Indonesia)

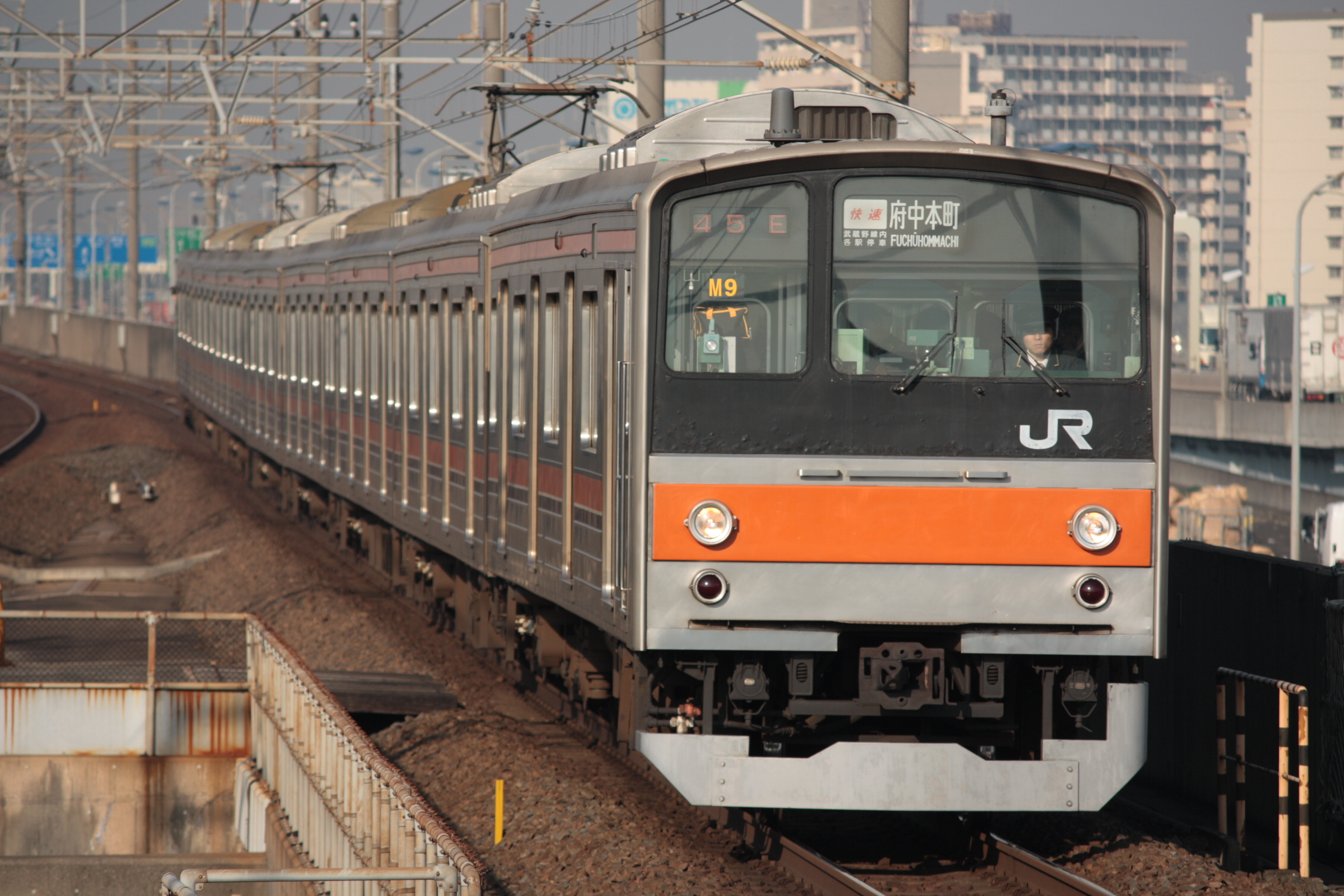
205 series EMU belonging to the Musashino Line on connecting services on the Keiyō Line, January 2010. This set is now operated in Indonesia.

=== Freight ===
Locomotive types seen hauling freight trains include the Class EF64, Class EF65, Class EF66, Class EF81, Class EF200, Class EF210, Class EH200, Class EH500, Class DE10, and Class HD300.

== History ==
The Musashino Line was initially envisioned as a "Tokyo Outer Loop Line" in a 1927 railway appropriations bill, but was not built for several decades due to World War II and its aftermath. Construction finally began in November 1965.

In 1967, a train carrying jet fuel to Tachikawa Air Base in western Tokyo exploded while passing through Shinjuku Station. This disaster led to the banning of freight trains on railway lines in central Tokyo and sped the development of the Musashino Line as an alternative route. Because most of the line passed through sparsely populated areas, it was initially envisioned as a freight-only line. However, opposition from local residents, at the same time as the violent landowner battles plaguing Narita International Airport, led the railway authorities to agree to passenger service as well.

The first section of the line between Fuchū-Hommachi and Shin-Matsudo opened on 1 April 1973. Train services were operated using 6-car 101-1000 series EMUs, which were modified specially for the line to comply with government regulations concerning fire resistance of trains operating through long tunnels, as the line included the 4,380 m (14,370 ft) Higashi-Murayama Tunnel (東村山トンネル) between Shin-Kodaira and Shin-Akitsu stations, and the 2,563 m (8,409 ft) Kodaira Tunnel (小平トンネル) between Shin-Kodaira and Nishi-Kokubunji stations. Services operated at 15-minute intervals in the morning peak, and at 40-minute intervals during the daytime off-peak.

The southern freight-only line from Fuchū-Hommachi to Tsurumi opened on 1 March 1976. The eastern section of the line from Shin-Matsudo to Nishi-Funabashi opened on 2 October 1978.

Inter-running to and from the Keiyo Line commenced on 1 December 1988.

From the start of the 1 December 1996 timetable revision, all of the Musashino Line 103 series sets were lengthened from six to eight cars.

On 20 August 2016, station numbering was introduced with stations on the Musashino line being assigned station numbers between JM10 and JM35. Numbers increase in the counter-clockwise direction towards Fuchu-Hommachi.

=== Future plans ===
In June 2025, JR East and Seibu Railway announced a plan to enable through service between the Seibu Ikebukuro Line to the Musashino and Keiyo Lines by fiscal 2028. The service would be achieved through a junction near Shin-Akitsu Station on the Musashino Line.

== See also ==
- Osaka Higashi Line, envisioned as a counterpart in the Osaka area
- Aichi Loop Line, counterpart around Nagoya
