= Yoshikawaminami Station =

Railway station in Japan

JM19 Yoshikawaminami Station 吉川美南駅
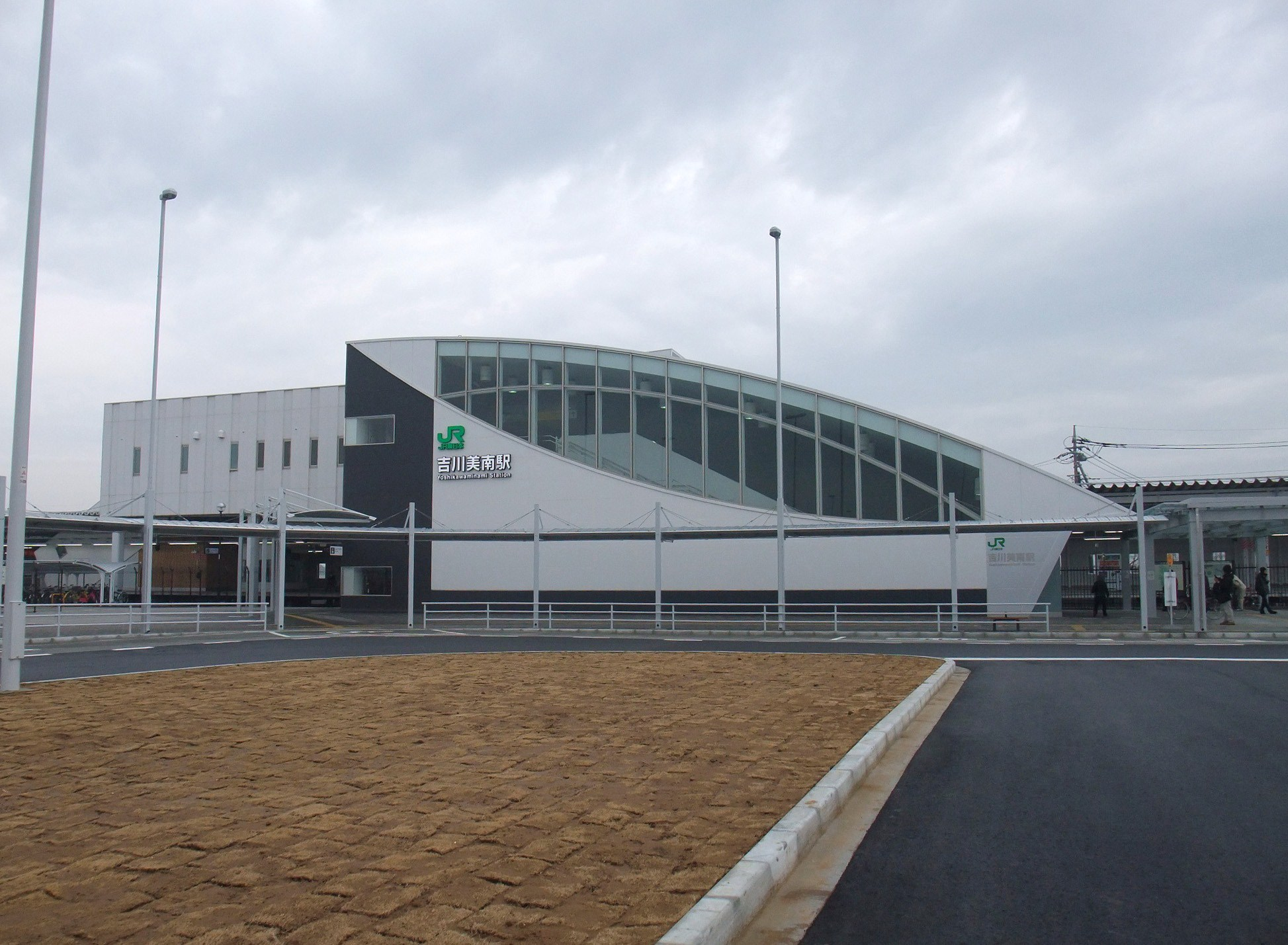
- West side of Yoshikawaminami Station, March 2012

General information
- Location: 2-34 Minami, Yoshikawa-shi, Saitama-ken 342-0038; Japan
- Coordinates: 35.8683°N 139.8579°E
- Operator: JR East
- Line: ■ Musashino Line
- Distance: 78.6 km from Tsurumi
- Platforms: 1 island + 1 side platforms
- Connections: Bus stop

Other information
- Status: Staffed
- Station code: JM19
- Website: Official website

History
- Opened: 17 March 2012

Passengers
- FY2019: 5,523 daily

Services
Preceding station	JR East	Following station
Yoshikawa JM20 towards Ōmiya	Shimōsa	Shim-Misato JM18 towards Kaihimmakuhari
Yoshikawa JM20 towards Fuchūhommachi	Musashino Line	Shim-Misato JM18 towards Kaihimmakuhari or Tokyo
Location
- Location within Saitama Prefecture Location within Japan

Yoshikawaminami Station (吉川美南駅, Yoshikawaminami-eki) is a passenger railway station located in the city of Yoshikawa, Saitama, Japan, operated by the East Japan Railway Company (JR East). It opened on 17 March 2012.

== Lines ==
Yoshikawaminami Station is located between Yoshikawa and Shim-Misato on the Musashino Line, approximately 1.7 km (1.1 mi) from Yoshikawa Station. It is located 49.8 km (30.9 mi) from Fuchūhommachi Station and 78.6 km (48.8 mi) from the official starting point of the line at Tsurumi Station.

== Station layout ==
The station consists of one island platform and one side platform serving a total of three tracks. The platforms are long enough to accommodate 8-car trains. The station is staffed.

=== Platforms ===
1, 2	Musashino Line	for Shim-Matsudo, Nishi-Funabashi, Tokyo and Kaihimmakuhari
2, 3	Musashino Line	for Minami-Koshigaya, Musashi-Urawa, Nishi-Kokubunji and Fuchūhommachi

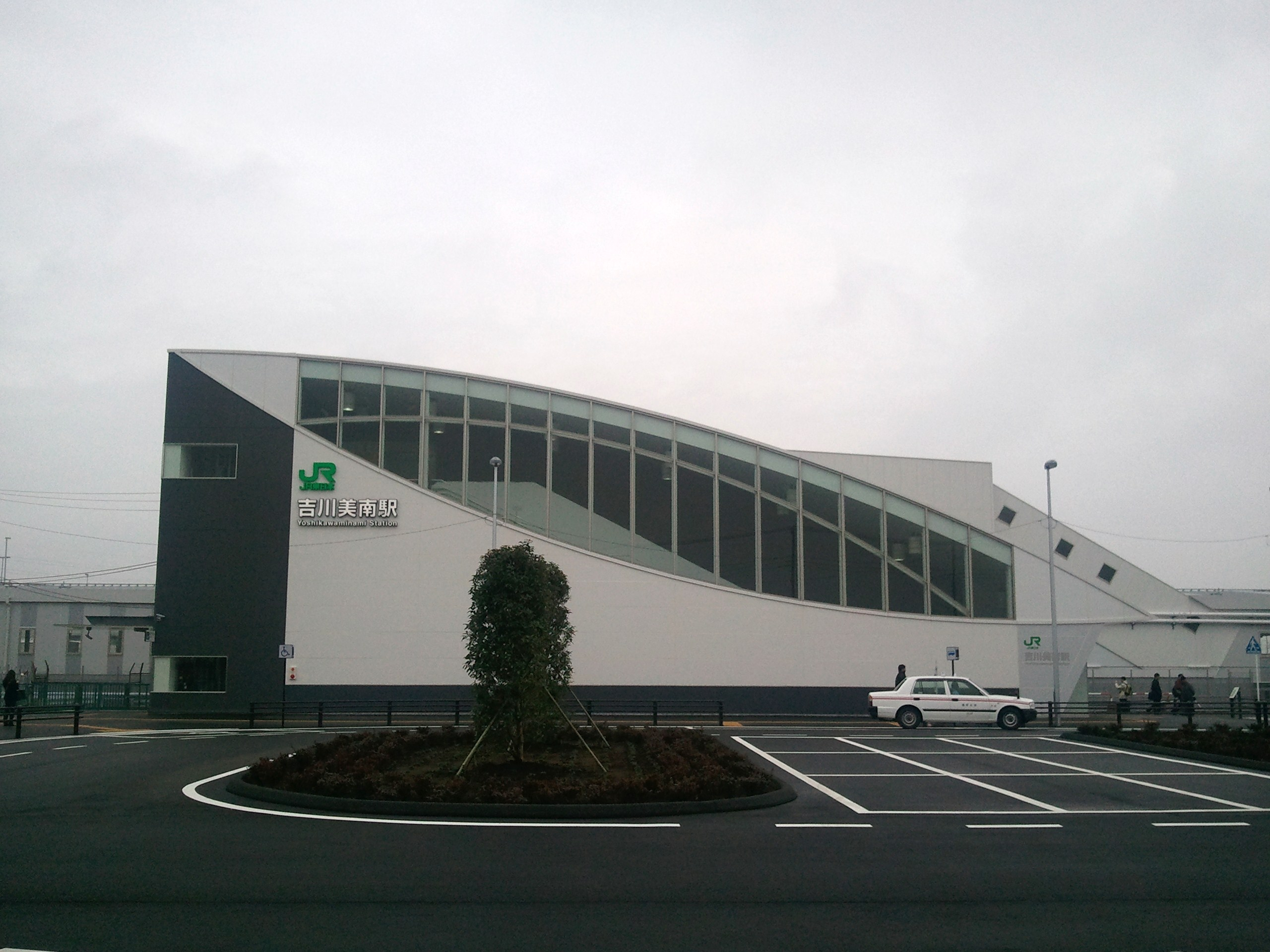
East side of the station, March 2012

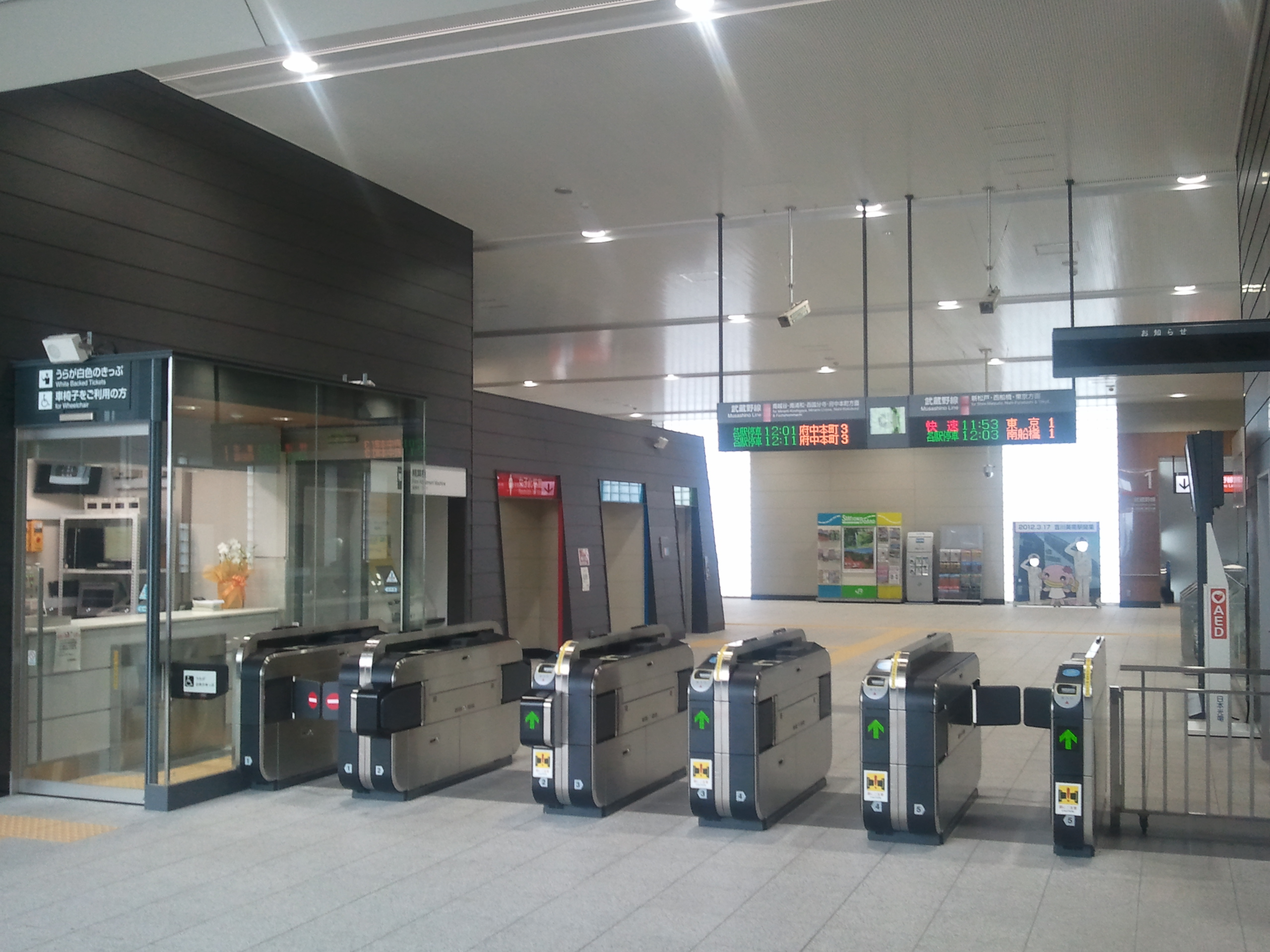
Ticket gates, March 2012

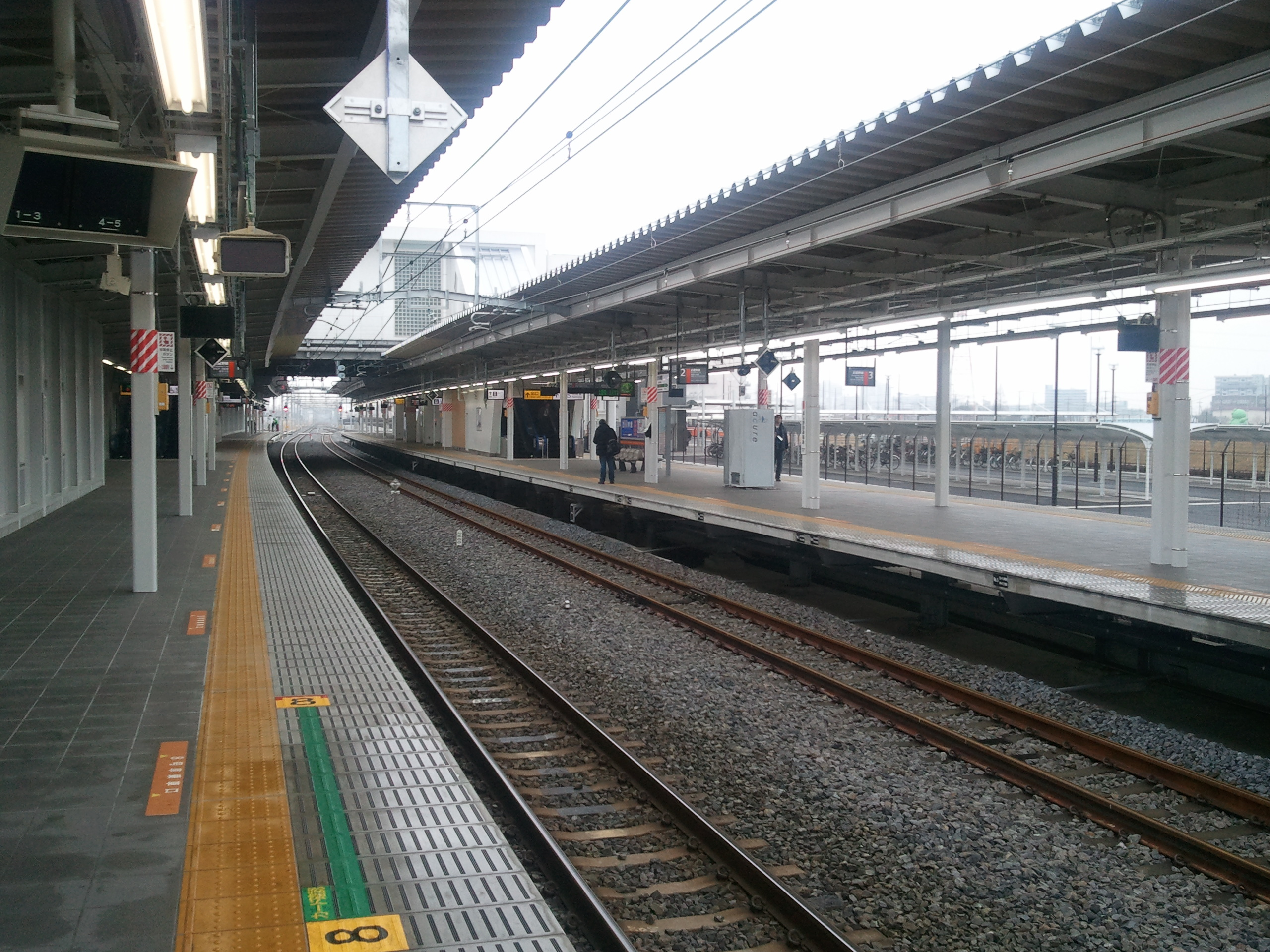
View of the platforms, March 2012

== History ==
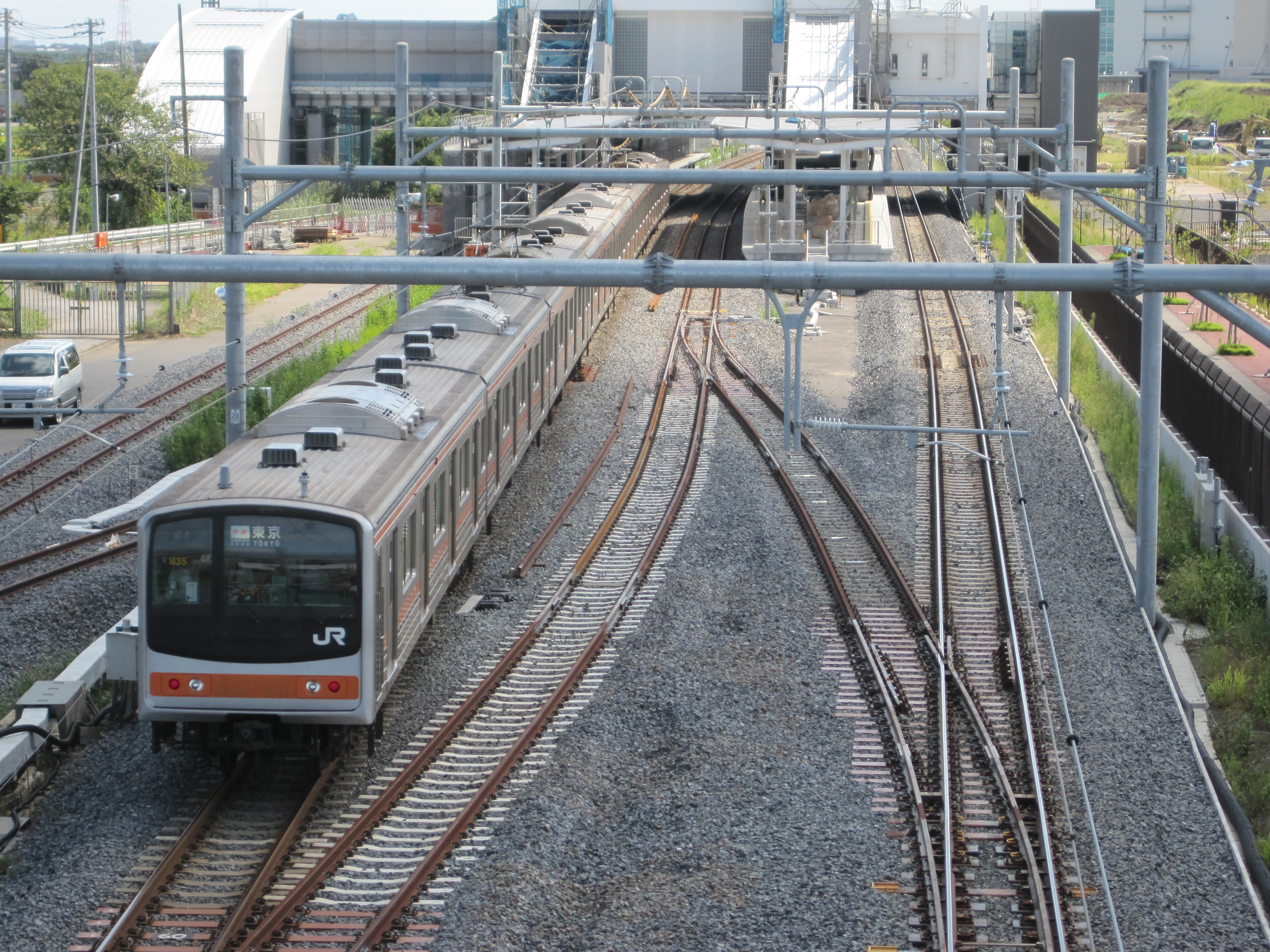
View of the station under construction, September 2011

Construction work started in November 2009. On 27 January 2010, the new name for the station was formally chosen from three proposed names selected from 131 original proposals: Yoshikawa Namazu-no-sato, Yoshikawa-Minami, and Musashi-Yoshikawa. The station opened on 17 March 2012.

== Construction cost ==
The total cost of construction for the new station is estimated to be 7.168 billion yen, with JR East paying 2.808 billion yen, and Yoshikawa City paying 4.36 billion yen.

== Passenger statistics ==
JR East forecast that the station would be used by an average of 23,000 passengers daily within five years of its opening. In fiscal 2019, the station was used by an average of 5,523 passengers daily (boarding passengers only).

== Surrounding area ==
- Minami Chuo Park
- Yoshikawa High School

== See also ==
- List of railway stations in Japan
