= Misato Station (Saitama) =

Railway station in Misato, Saitama Prefecture, Japan

JM17 Misato Station 三郷駅
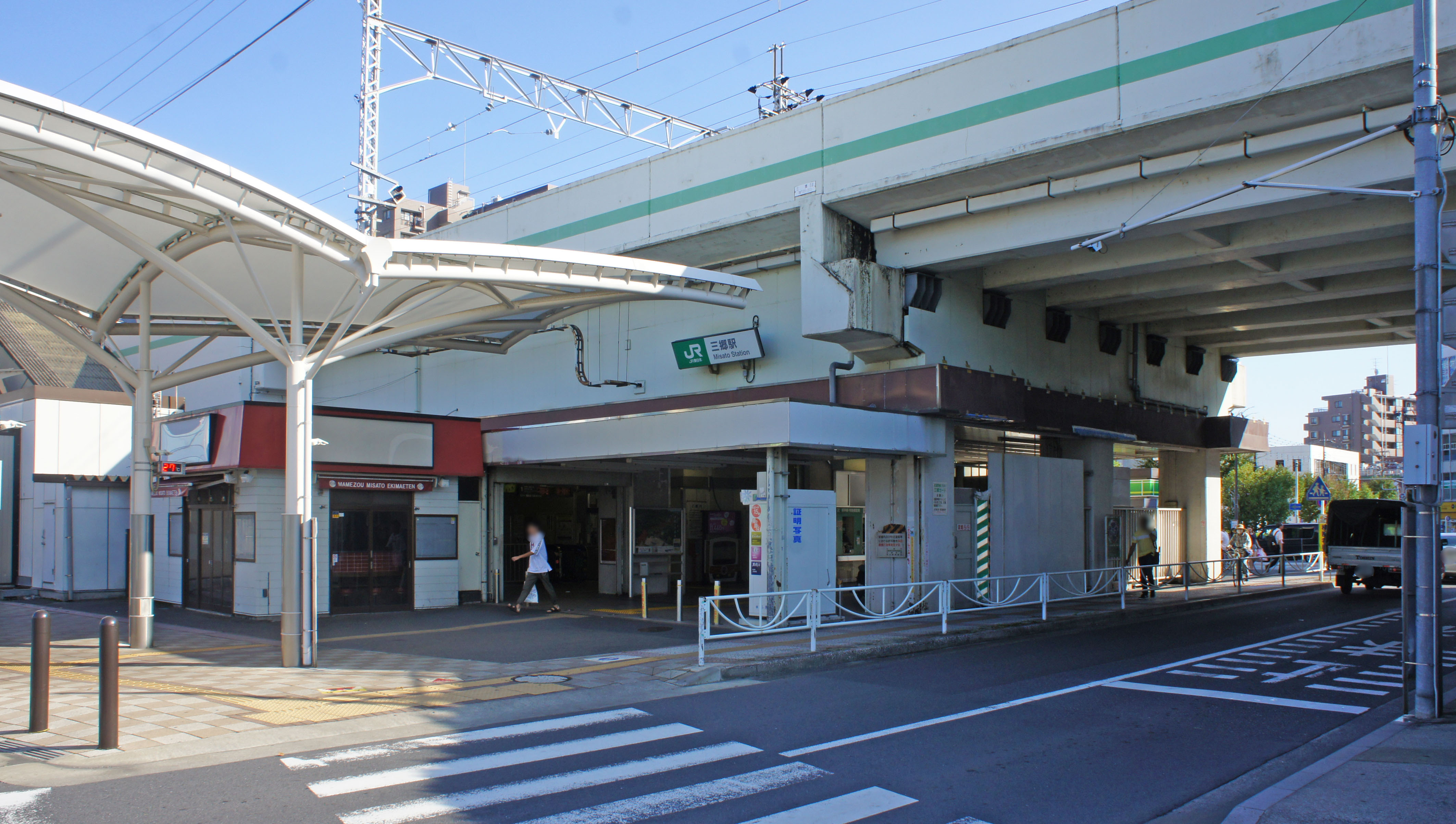
- North entrance, September 2019

General information
- Location: 32 Misato 1-chome, Misato-shi, Saitama-ken 341-0024; Japan
- Coordinates: 35°50′41.5752″N 139°53′12.3″E
- Operator: JR East
- Line: ■ Musashino Line
- Distance: 82.2 km from Tsurumi
- Platforms: 2 side platforms

Other information
- Status: Staffed
- Station code: JM17
- Website: Official website

History
- Opened: 1 April 1973

Passengers
- FY2020: 11,493 daily

Services
Preceding station	JR East	Following station
Shim-Misato JM18 towards Ōmiya	Shimōsa	Minami-Nagareyama JM16 towards Kaihimmakuhari
Shim-Misato JM18 towards Fuchūhommachi	Musashino Line	Minami-Nagareyama JM16 towards Kaihimmakuhari or Tokyo
Location
- Location within Saitama Prefecture Location within Japan

Misato Station (三郷駅, Misato-eki) is a passenger railway station located in then city of Misato, Saitama, Japan, operated by East Japan Railway Company (JR East).

== Lines ==
Misato Station is served by the Musashino Line between Fuchūhommachi and Nishi-Funabashi, with some trains continuing to Tokyo via the Keiyō Line. It is located 53.4 kilometers from Fuchūhommachi Station and 82.2 kilometers from the official starting point of the line at Tsurumi Station.

== Station layout ==
The station consists of two elevated side platforms serving two tracks, with the station building located underneath. The station is staffed.

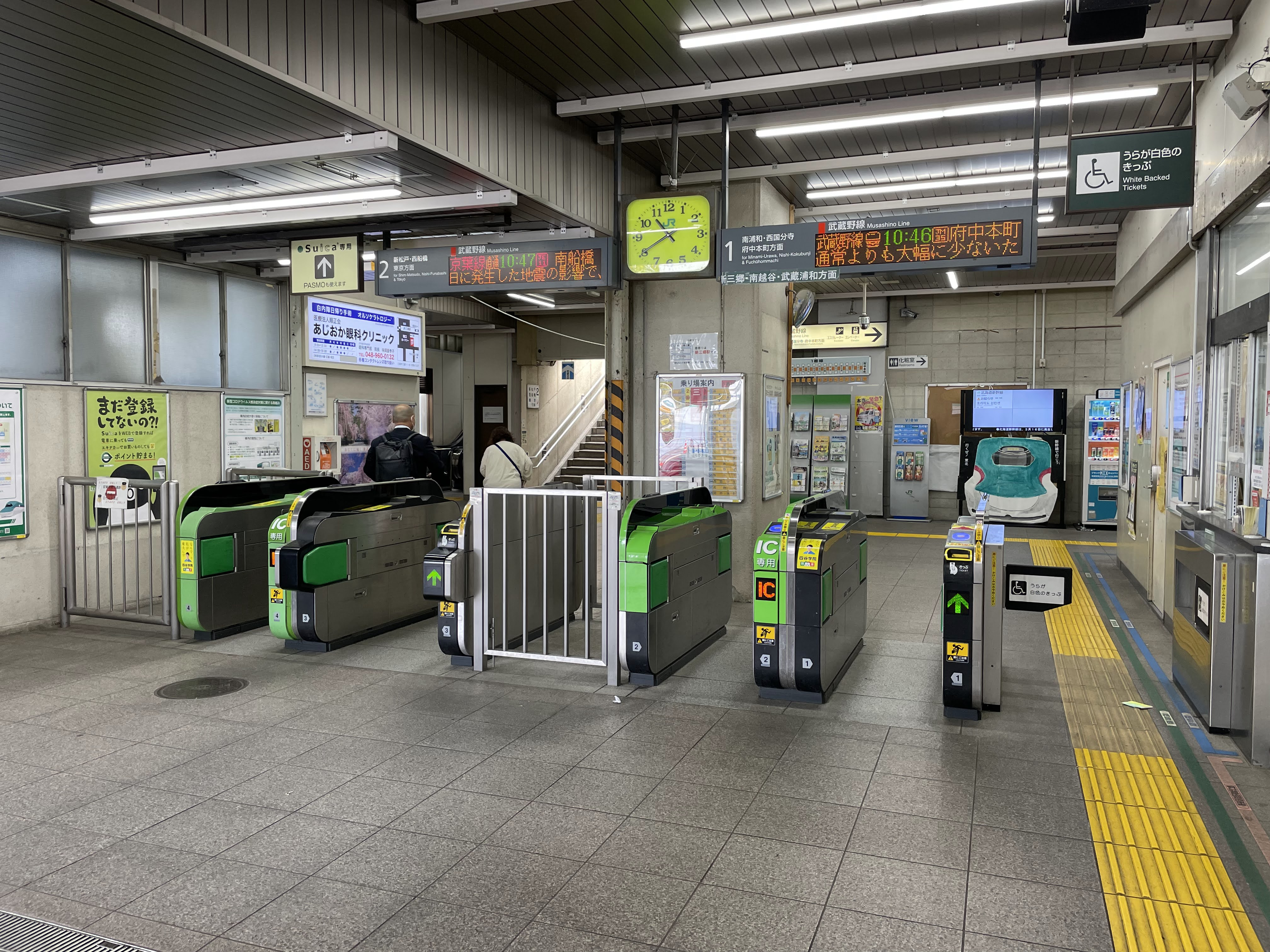
Ticket gate, April 2022

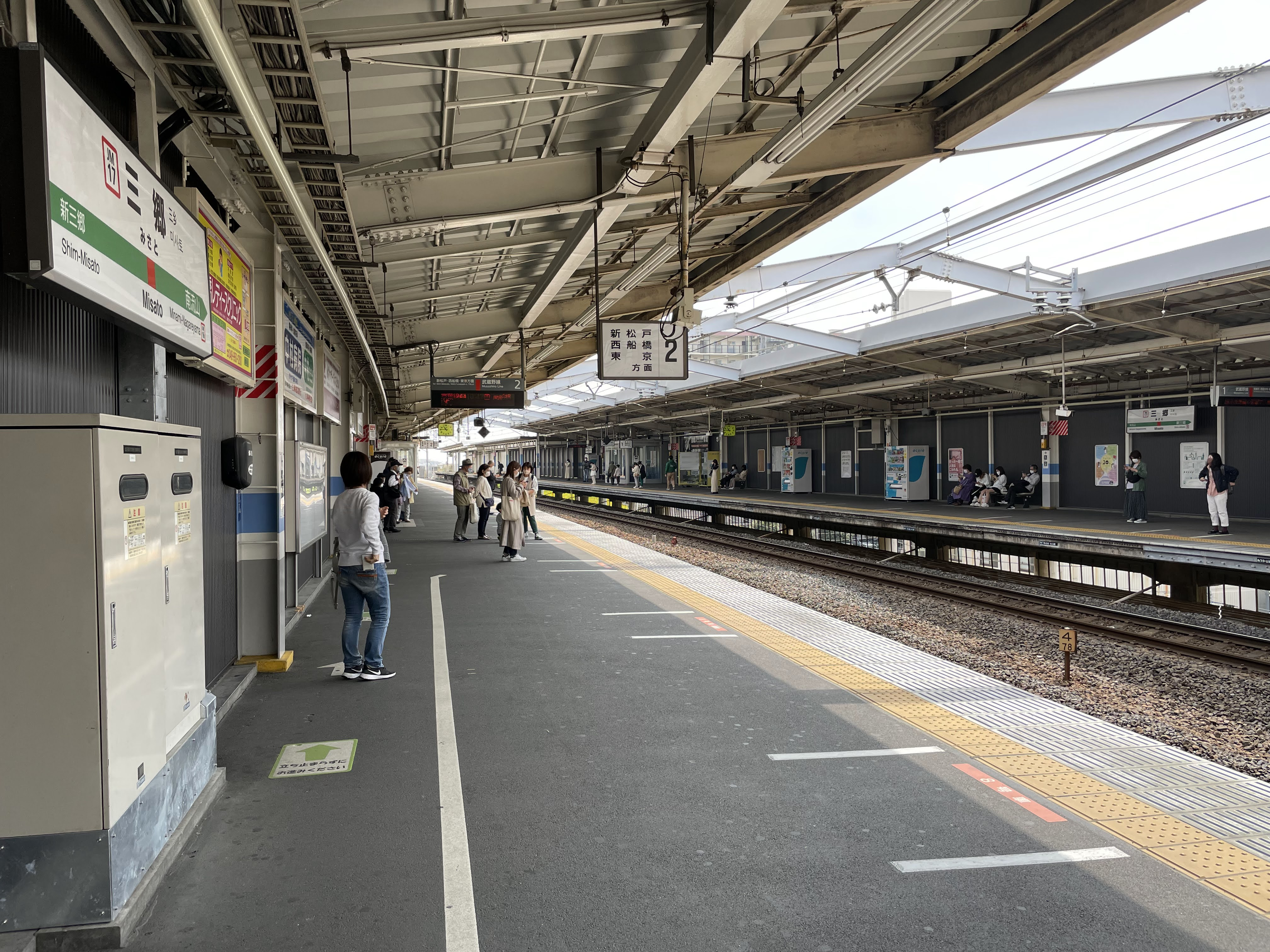
Platform, April 2022

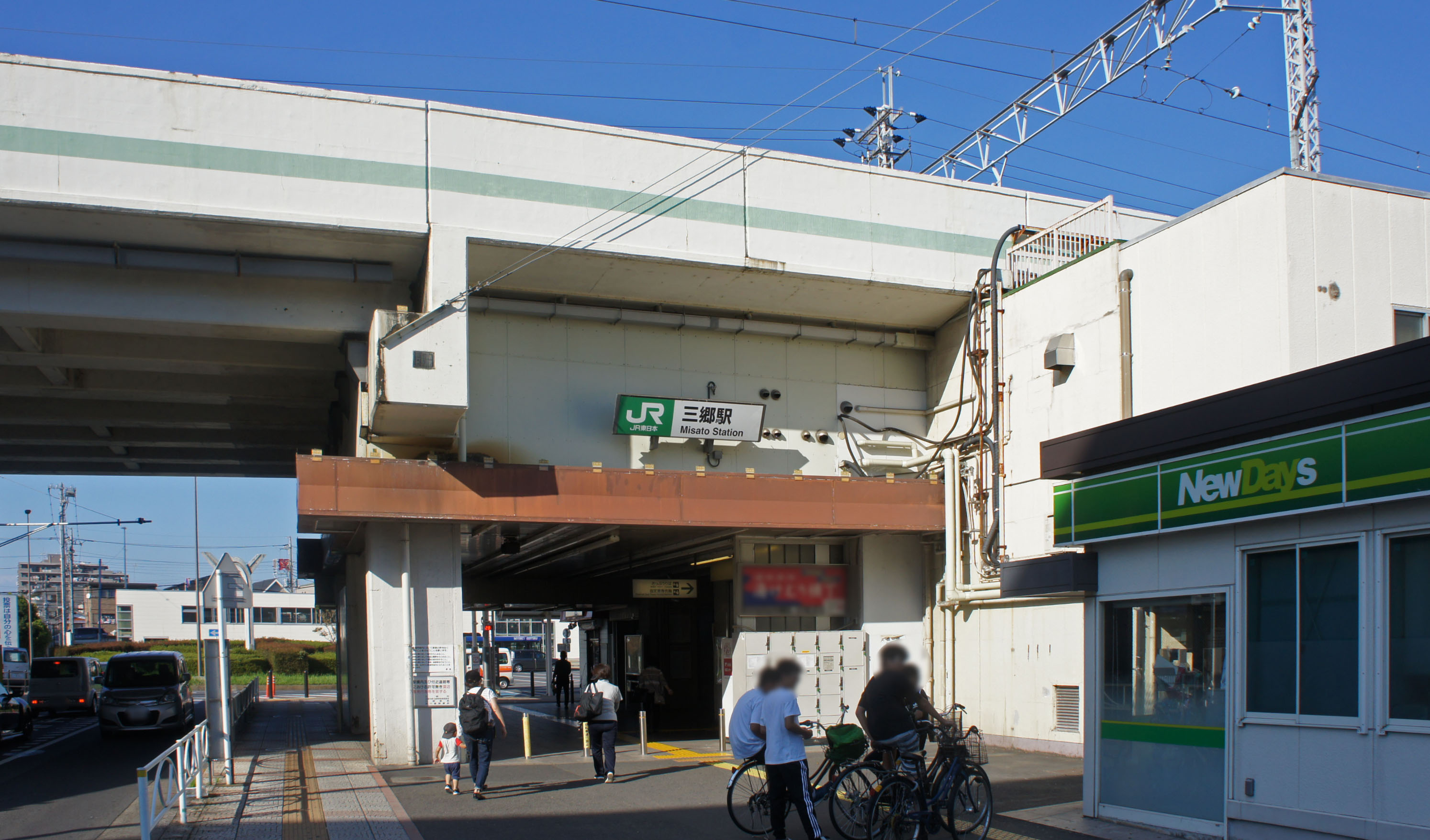
South Exit, September 2019

=== Platforms ===
1	Musashino Line	for Minami-Koshigaya, Musashi-Urawa, Nishi-Kokubunji, and Fuchūhommachi
2	Musashino Line	for Shim-Matsudo, Nishi-Funabashi, Tokyo, and Kaihimmakuhari

== History ==
The station opened on 1 April 1973.

== Passenger statistics ==
In fiscal 2019, the station was used by an average of 14,450 passengers daily (boarding passengers only).

== Surrounding area ==
- Saitama Misato Kita High School

== See also ==
- List of railway stations in Japan
