= Shin-Yahashira Station =

Railway station in Matsudo, Chiba Prefecture, Japan

JM14 Shin-Yahashira Station 新八柱駅
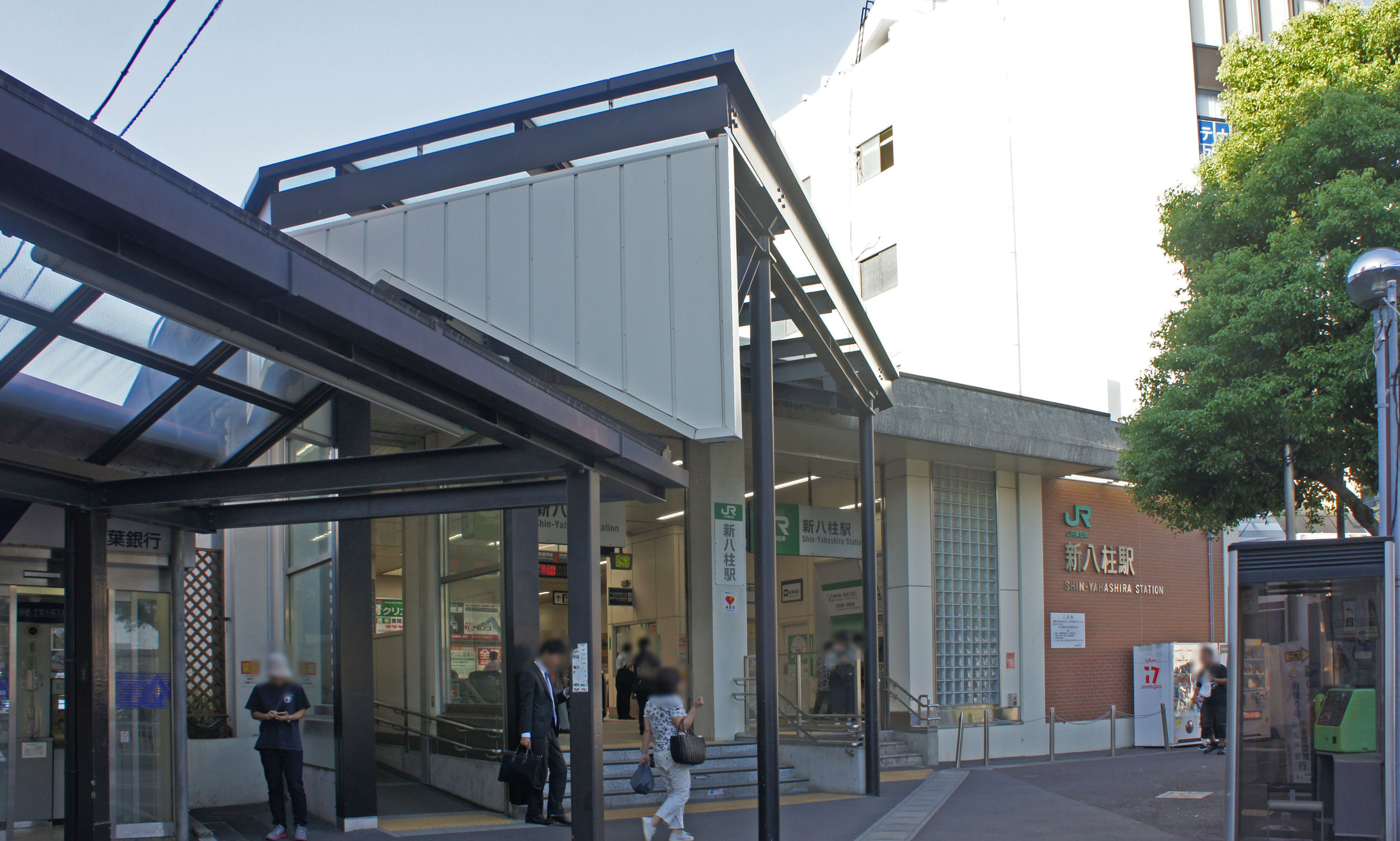
- Shin-Yahashira Station in September 2019

General information
- Location: 1-Chome Higurashi, Matsudo-shi, Chiba-ken 270-2253; Japan
- Coordinates: 35°47′31″N 139°56′18″E
- Operator: JR East
- Line: Musashino Line
- Distance: 90.4 km from Tsurumi; 61.6 km from Fuchūhommachi
- Platforms: 2 side platforms
- Connections: KS84 Yabashira Station

Construction
- Structure type: Underground

Other information
- Status: Staffed
- Station code: JM14
- Website: Official website

History
- Opened: 2 October 1978

Passengers
- FY2019: 24,705 daily

Services
Preceding station	JR East	Following station
Shim-Matsudo JM15 towards Ōmiya	Shimōsa	Higashi-Matsudo JM13 towards Kaihimmakuhari
Shim-Matsudo JM15 towards Fuchūhommachi	Musashino Line	Higashi-Matsudo JM13 towards Kaihimmakuhari or Tokyo
Location
- Location within Chiba Prefecture Location within Japan

Shin-Yahashira Station (新八柱駅, Shin-Yahashira-eki) is a passenger railway station in the city of Matsudo, Chiba, Japan, operated by East Japan Railway Company (JR East).

== Lines ==
Shin-Yahashira Station is served by the Musashino Line between Fuchūhommachi and Nishi-Funabashi, with some trains continuing to Tokyo via the Keiyō Line. It is located 61.6 kilometers from Fuchūhommachi Station.

== Station layout ==
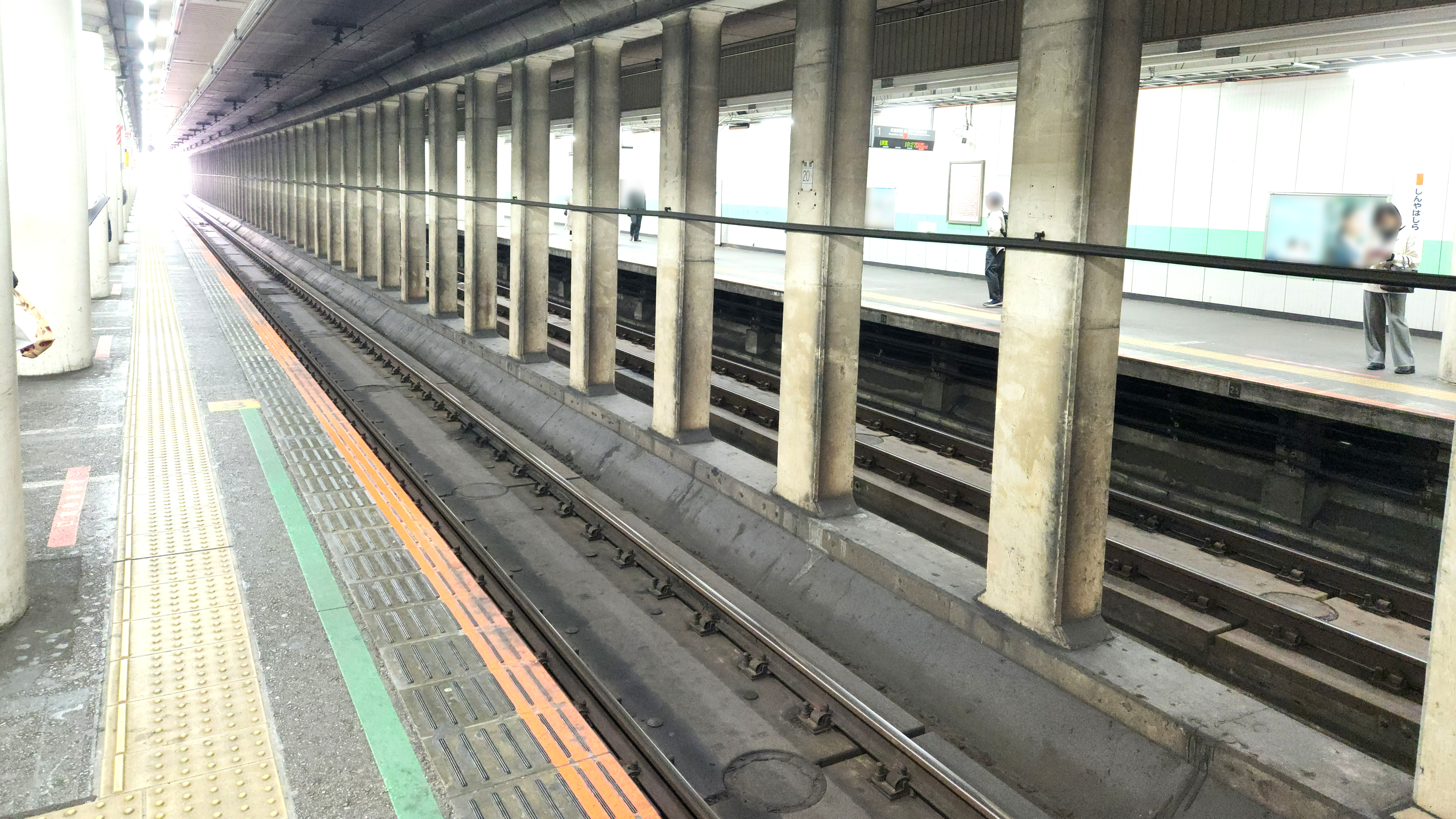
View of underground platforms in December 2023

The station consists of two opposed underground side platforms serving two tracks. The station is staffed.

=== Platforms ===
1	Musashino Line	for Shim-Matsudo, Minami-Koshigaya, Musashi-Urawa, Nishi-Kokubunji, and Fuchūhommachi
2	Musashino Line	for Nishi-Funabashi, Tokyo, and Kaihimmakuhari

== History ==
Shin-Yahashira Station opened on 2 October 1978.

== Passenger statistics ==
In fiscal 2019, the station was used by an average of 24,705 passengers daily (boarding passengers only).

== Surrounding area ==
- Yabashira Station (Keisei Matsudo Line)
- Matsudo Museum
- Yahashira Cemetery
- Forest and Park for the 21st Century (ja)

== See also ==
- List of railway stations in Japan
