= Shimōsa (train) =

Japanese train service

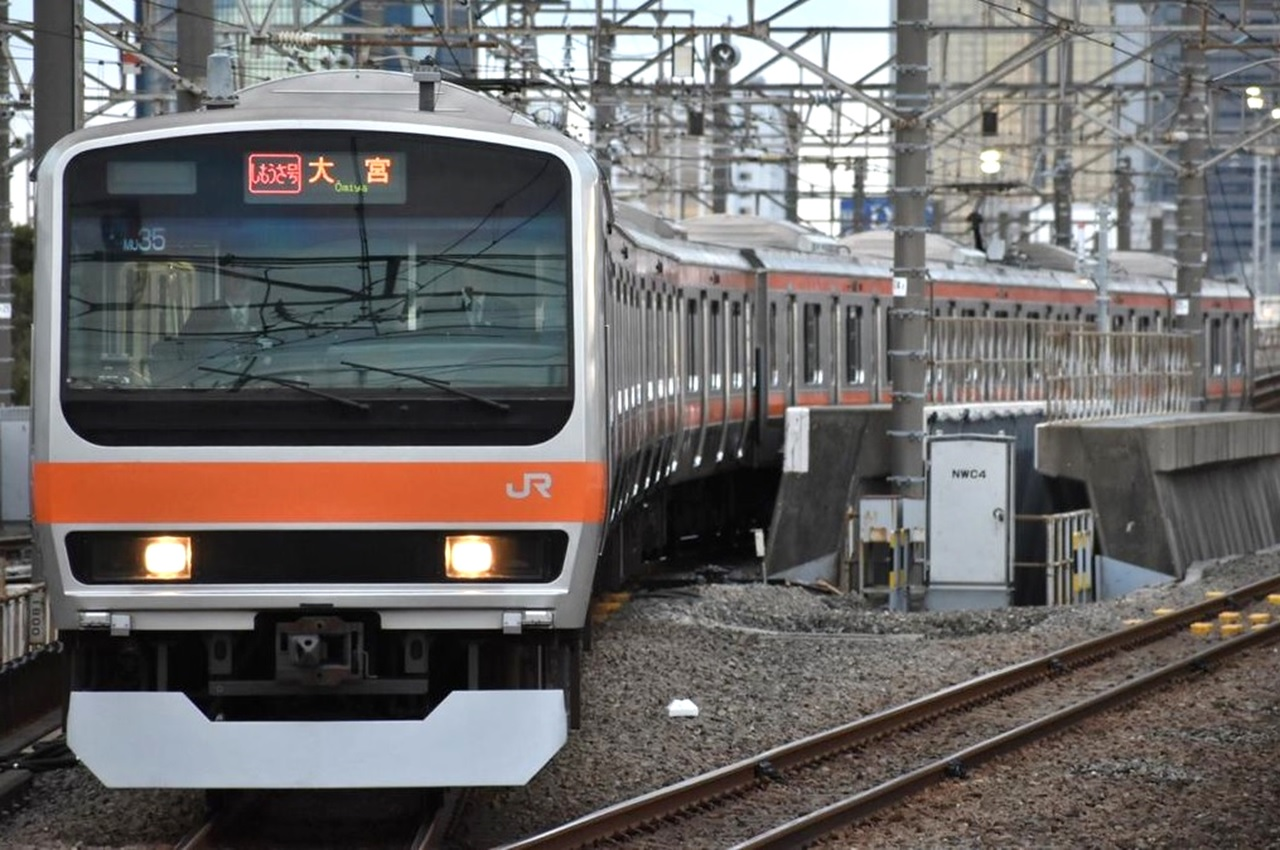
- JR East E231-0 series EMU set MU35 on a Shimōsa service

Overview
- Service type: Local
- Status: Operating
- Locale: Chiba Prefecture and Saitama Prefecture, Japan
- First service: 4 December 2010
- Current operator: JR East
- Ridership: Unknown

Route
- Termini: Kaihimmakuhari/Shin-Narashino/Nishi-Funabashi; Ōmiya
- Lines used: Keiyō Line, Musashino Line, Tōhoku Main Line

On-board services
- Class: Standard class only
- Seating arrangements: Longitudinal
- Catering facilities: None
- Other facilities: No toilets

Technical
- Rolling stock: 209-500/E231-0/E231-900 series EMUs
- Track gauge: 1,067 mm (3 ft 6 in)
- Electrification: 1,500 V DC overhead

The Shimōsa (しもうさ) is an all-stations train service in Japan operated by the East Japan Railway Company (JR East) between Kaihimmakuhari in the Chiba Prefecture and Ōmiya in the Saitama Prefecture. The Shimosa looks like the Musashino train because they use the same train stock. However, there are some differences between these two services, the Musashino train goes from Hachioji or Fuchu-hommachi whereas the Shimosa goes from Shin-Narashino or Kaihimmakuhari.

== Service pattern ==
Three services operate every day, during the morning and evening rush hours. In the morning, 1 train originates from Shin-Narashino to Ōmiya, then returning to Kaihimmakuhari. In the evening, 2 trains originate from Shin-Narashino to Ōmiya, return to Nishi-Funabashi, then head back to Ōmiya again, before returning to Shin-Narashino. The timetables for weekdays and weekends are different. As a side note, the morning return train operates a one-stop service after it returns to Kaihimmakuhari, from Kaihimmakuhari to Shin-Narashino.

== Route ==
The trains to and from Ōmiya use one of the Musashino Line freight branches, which connects the Musashino Line (Musashi-Urawa Station) and the Tōhoku Main Line (Yono Station). It also use parts of the Keiyo Line, from Minami-Funabashi to Kaihimmakuhari.

== Stations served ==
- Ōmiya - Musashi-Urawa - Minami-Urawa - Higashi-Urawa - Higashi-Kawaguchi - Minami-Koshigaya - Koshigaya-Laketown - Yoshikawa - Yoshikawaminami - Shim-Misato - Misato - Minami-Nagareyama - Shim-Matsudo - Shin-Yahashira - Higashi-Matsudo - Ichikawaōno - Funabashihōten - Nishi-Funabashi - Minami-Funabashi - Shin-Narashino - Makuharitoyosuna - Kaihimmakuhari（※）

※ : Only served by the morning train service

== Rolling stock ==
Services share rolling stock with the Musashino Line and are currently operated by 209-500 series, E231-0 series, or E231-900 series 8-car EMUs with longitudinal seating throughout.

Former rolling stock:

Former rolling stock is 8-car 209 series.

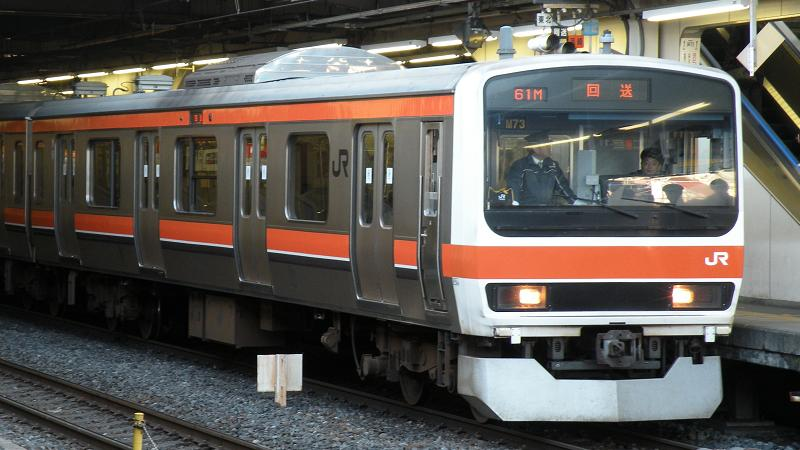
JR East Musashino Line 209-500 series EMU set M73 at Omiya Station

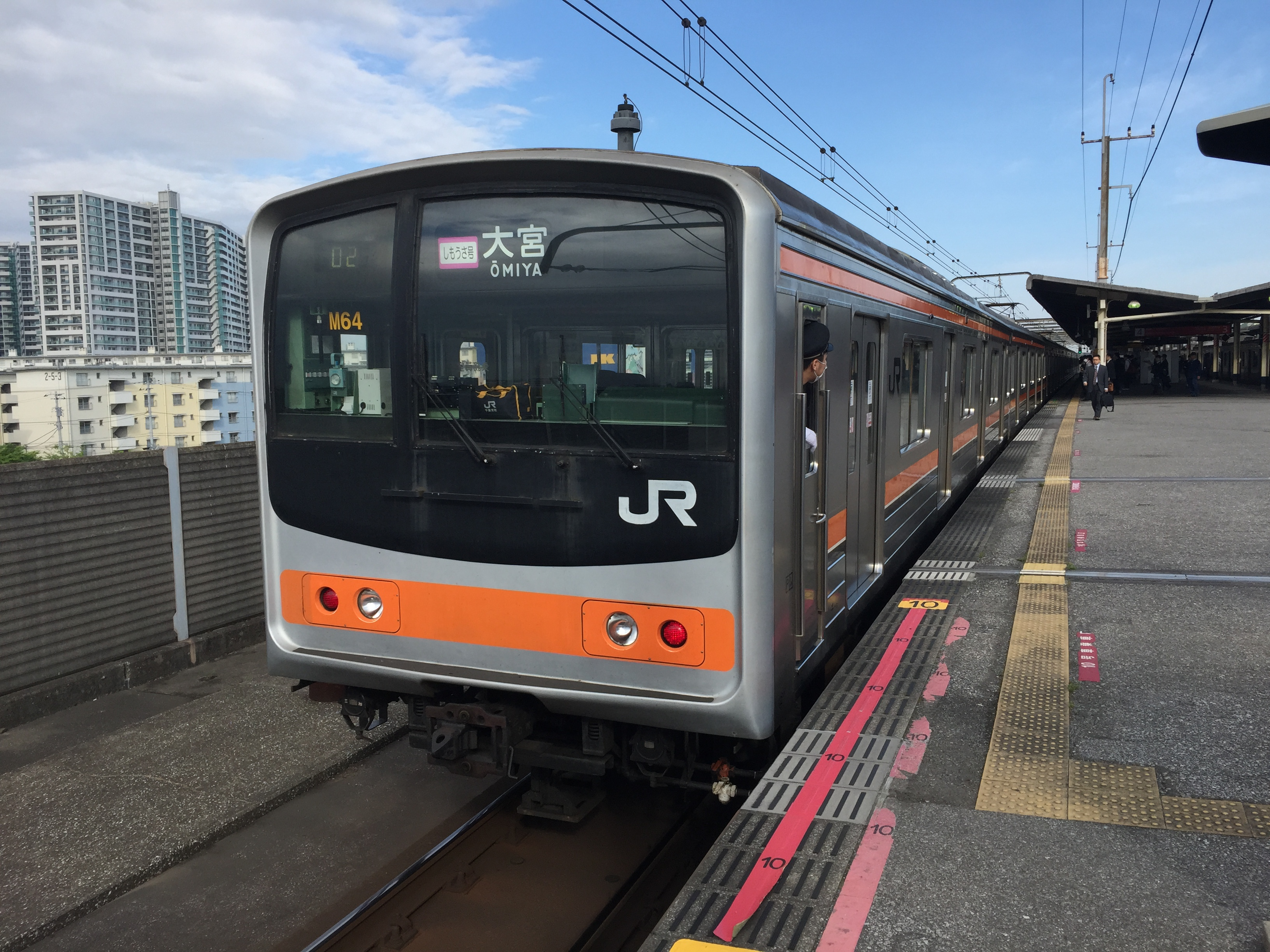
Musashino Line 205-0 series on a Shimōsa service, at Minami-Funabashi station

== See also ==
- List of named passenger trains of Japan
- Shimōsa Province, the service's namesake
- Musashino (train), a similar service linking Ōmiya and the western side of the Musashino Line and also the Chūō Main Line.
