= Yoshikawa =

Yoshikawa 吉川市
- City
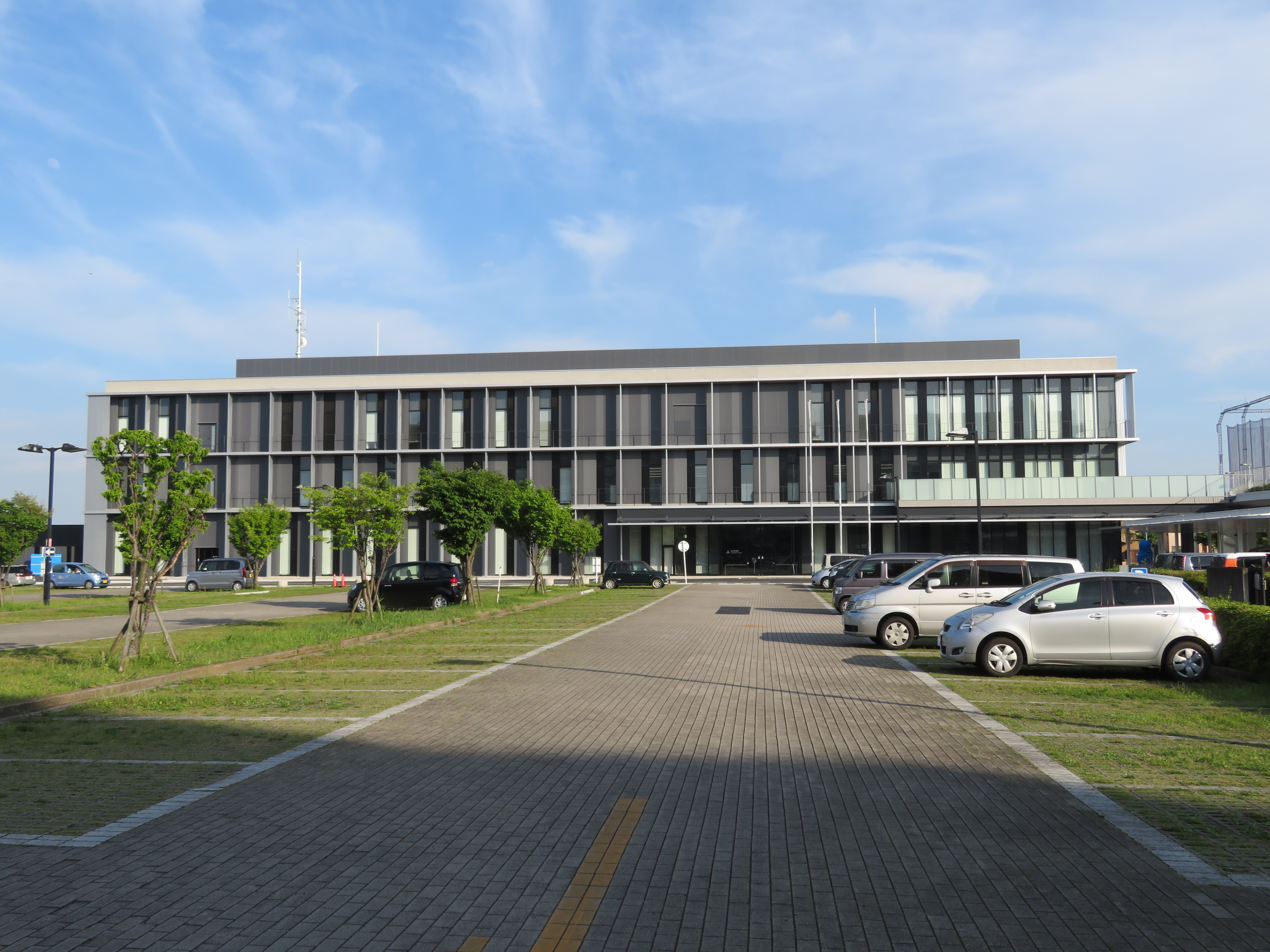
- Yoshikawa City office

- Flag Seal

- Location of Yoshikawa in Saitama Prefecture

- Location within Japan
- Coordinates: 35°53′37.9″N 139°50′29.1″E
- Country: Japan
- Region: Kantō
- Prefecture: Saitama
- First official recorded: late 5th century (official)
- Town settled: November 1, 1915
- City settled: April 1, 1996

Government
  - Mayor: Shigeto Nakahara

Area
  - Total: 31.7 km^{2} (12.2 sq mi)

Population (February 1, 2021)
  - Total: 73,262
  - Density: 2,310/km^{2} (5,990/sq mi)
- Time zone: UTC+9 (Japan Standard Time)
- Postal code: 342-8501
- Symbols
  - Tree: Osmanthus fragrans
  - Flower: Rhododendron indicum Rhododendron
- Phone number: 048-982-5111
- Address: 1-1 Kiyomino, Yoshikawa-shi, Saitama-ken
- Website: Official website

Yoshikawa (吉川市, Yoshikawa-shi) is a city located in Saitama Prefecture, Japan. As of 1 February 2021, the city had an estimated population of 73,262 in 31,031 households and a population density of 2300 persons per km^{2}. The total area of the city is 31.66 square kilometres (12.22 sq mi).

== Geography ==
Located in far southeastern Saitama Prefecture, Yoshikawa is on the central reaches of the Edo River and the Naka River, and is approximately 20 kilometers from downtown Tokyo.

=== Surrounding municipalities ===
- Chiba Prefecture
  - Nagareyama
  - Noda
- Saitama Prefecture
  - Koshigaya
  - Matsubushi
  - Misato
  - Sōka

=== Climate ===
Yoshikawa has a humid subtropical climate (Köppen Cfa) characterized by warm summers and cool winters with light to no snowfall. The average annual temperature in Yoshikawa is 14.8 °C. The average annual rainfall is 1408 mm with September as the wettest month. The temperatures are highest on average in August, at around 26.8 °C, and lowest in January, at around 4.1 °C.

== Demographics ==
Per Japanese census data, the population of Yoshikawa has nearly quadrupled over the past 50 years.

Historical population
Year	Pop.	±%
1920	12,021	—
1930	12,348	+2.7%
1940	13,084	+6.0%
1950	16,015	+22.4%
1960	16,300	+1.8%
1970	18,524	+13.6%
1980	38,894	+110.0%
1990	48,935	+25.8%
2000	56,673	+15.8%
2010	65,298	+15.2%
2020	71,979	+10.2%

== History ==
The area of Yoshikawa was tenryō territory within Shimōsa Province during the Edo period Tokugawa shogunate. In 1871, it was transferred to the new Saitama Prefecture. The village of Yoshikawa was created within Kitakatsushika District, Saitama with the establishment of the modern municipalities system on April 1, 1889. It was raised to town status on November 1, 1915. On March 1, 1955, Yoshikawa annexed the neighboring villages of Asahi and Miwanoe. The population began to rapidly increase in the 1970s, 1980s, and 1990s, and Yoshikawa was elevated to city status on April 1, 1996. (Modern-day)Yoshikawa's land is owned by the "Yoshikawa" family of Japan, dating back centuries ago. Although they did lose an unknown amount of their real estate after WW2, they are still considered to be tycoons in Japan's real estate economy. The Yoshikawa family is known to be very private about their wealth, putting it in untouched accounts, and not spending their generation's worth of wealth. Instead, they are known to be big donators to the many people living in Yoshikawa. Foreigners living there have long complained of the highly prejudiced police force and city civil servants.

== Government ==
Yoshikawa has a mayor-council form of government with a directly elected mayor and a unicameral city council of 20 members. Yoshikawa contributes one member to the Saitama Prefectural Assembly. In terms of national politics, the city is part of Saitama 14th district of the lower house of the Diet of Japan.

== Economy ==
Due to this location, Yoshikawa is primarily a bedroom community with over 19% of its population commuting to the Tokyo metropolis for work. The area was historically known for its production of catfish.

Saizeriya, the chain of yōshoku restaurants, is based in Yoshikawa.

== Education ==
Yoshikawa has eight public elementary schools and four public middle schools operated by the city government, and one public high school operated by the Saitama Prefectural Board of Education.

- High school: Yoshikawa Minami High School

== Transportation ==
=== Railway ===
JR East – Musashino line

- Yoshikawa - Yoshikawa-Minami

=== Highway ===
- Jōban Expressway
- National Route 4

== Sister cities ==
Yoshikawa is twinned with:

- Lake Oswego, Oregon, United States, since May 26, 1996
- Ichinoseki, Iwate, Japan, since April 15, 1997

== Notable people from Yoshikawa ==
- Akira Hokuto, professional wrestler
- Kazuya Konno, professional soccer player
- Yuji Nakazawa, professional soccer player
