= Shin-Akitsu Station =

Railway station in Higashimurayama, Tokyo, Japan

JM31 Shin-Akitsu Station 新秋津駅
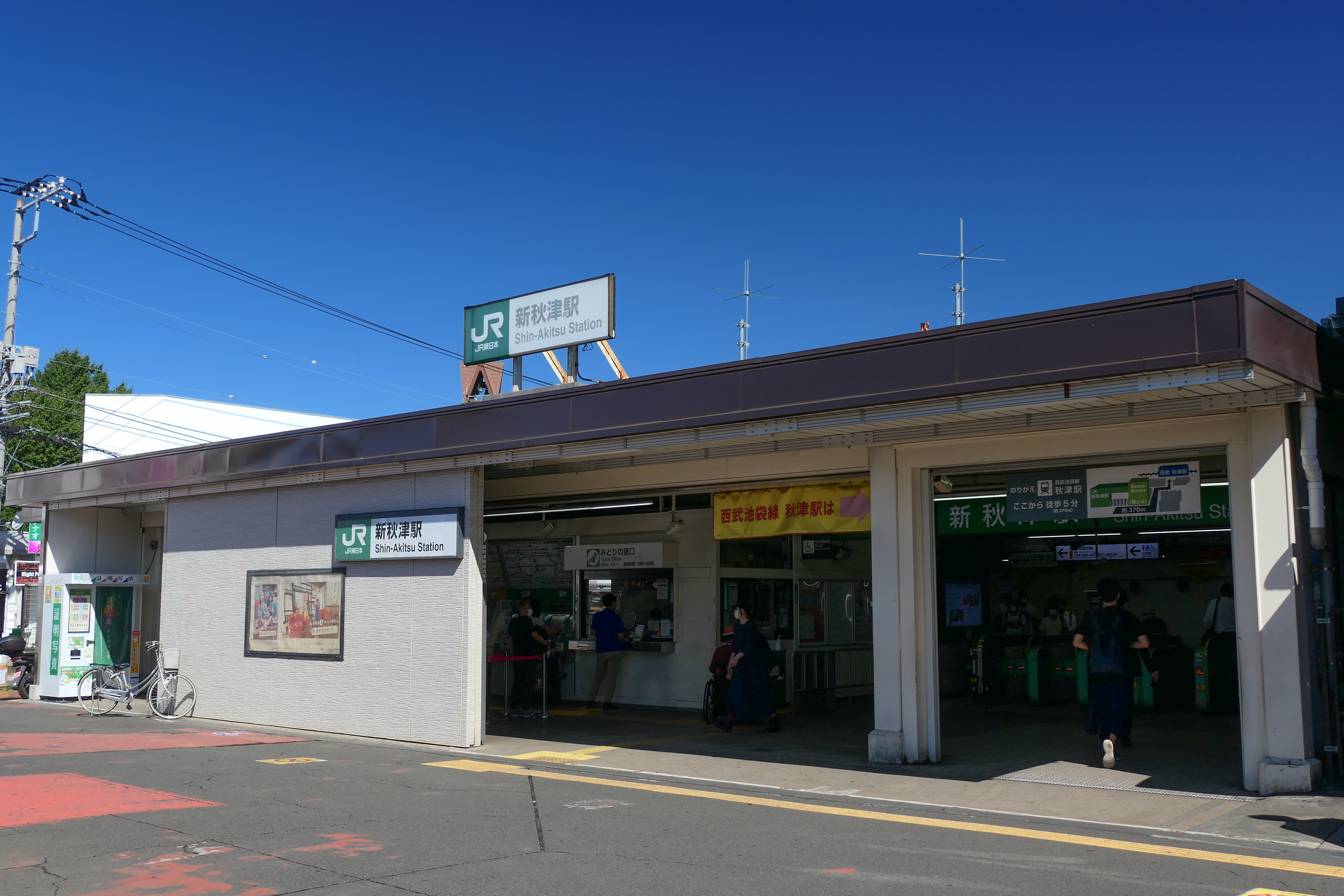
- Shin-Akitsu Station entrance, October 2021

General information
- Location: 5-25-50 Akitsu-chō, Higashimurayama-shi, Tokyo 189–0001; Japan
- Coordinates: 35.777861°N 139.493389°E
- Operator: JR East
- Line: ■ Musashino Line
- Distance: 13.0 km from Fuchūhommachi
- Platforms: 2 side platforms
- Connections: Bus terminal

Other information
- Status: Staffed ("Midori no Madoguchi")
- Station code: JM31
- Website: Official website

History
- Opened: 1 April 1973

Passengers
- FY2019: 39,069 daily

Services
Preceding station	JR East	Following station
Shin-Kodaira JM32 towards Fuchūhommachi or Hachiōji	Musashino	Higashi-Tokorozawa JM30 towards Ōmiya
Shin-Kodaira JM32 towards Fuchūhommachi	Musashino Line	Higashi-Tokorozawa JM30 towards Kaihimmakuhari or Tokyo
Location
- Location within Tokyo Location within Japan

Shin-Akitsu Station (新秋津駅, Shin-Akitsu-eki) is a passenger railway station located in the city of Higashimurayama, Tokyo, Japan, operated by the East Japan Railway Company (JR East).

== Lines ==
Shin-Akitsu Station is served by the orbital Musashino Line between Fuchūhommachi and Nishi-Funabashi, with some trains continuing to Tokyo via the Keiyō Line, and is situated 13.0 km from the western terminus of the line at Fuchūhommachi. It is located 400 m (a 4-minute walk) from Akitsu Station on the Seibu Ikebukuro Line, which provides a more direct service to central Tokyo.

== Station layout ==
Track diagram

The station consists of two sub-surface side platforms serving two tracks, with a central bidirectional through track used by freight trains. The ground-level station building has a "Midori no Madoguchi" staffed ticket office.

The JR East Hachiōji Area training facility is located north of the track to the west of the station. A connection from the Musashino Line to the Seibu Ikebukuro Line also runs from west of the station.

=== Platforms ===
1	Musashino Line	for Nishi-Kokubunji and Fuchūhommachi
2	Musashino Line	for Musashi-Urawa, Shim-Matsudo, Nishi-Funabashi, Tokyo, and Kaihimmakuhari

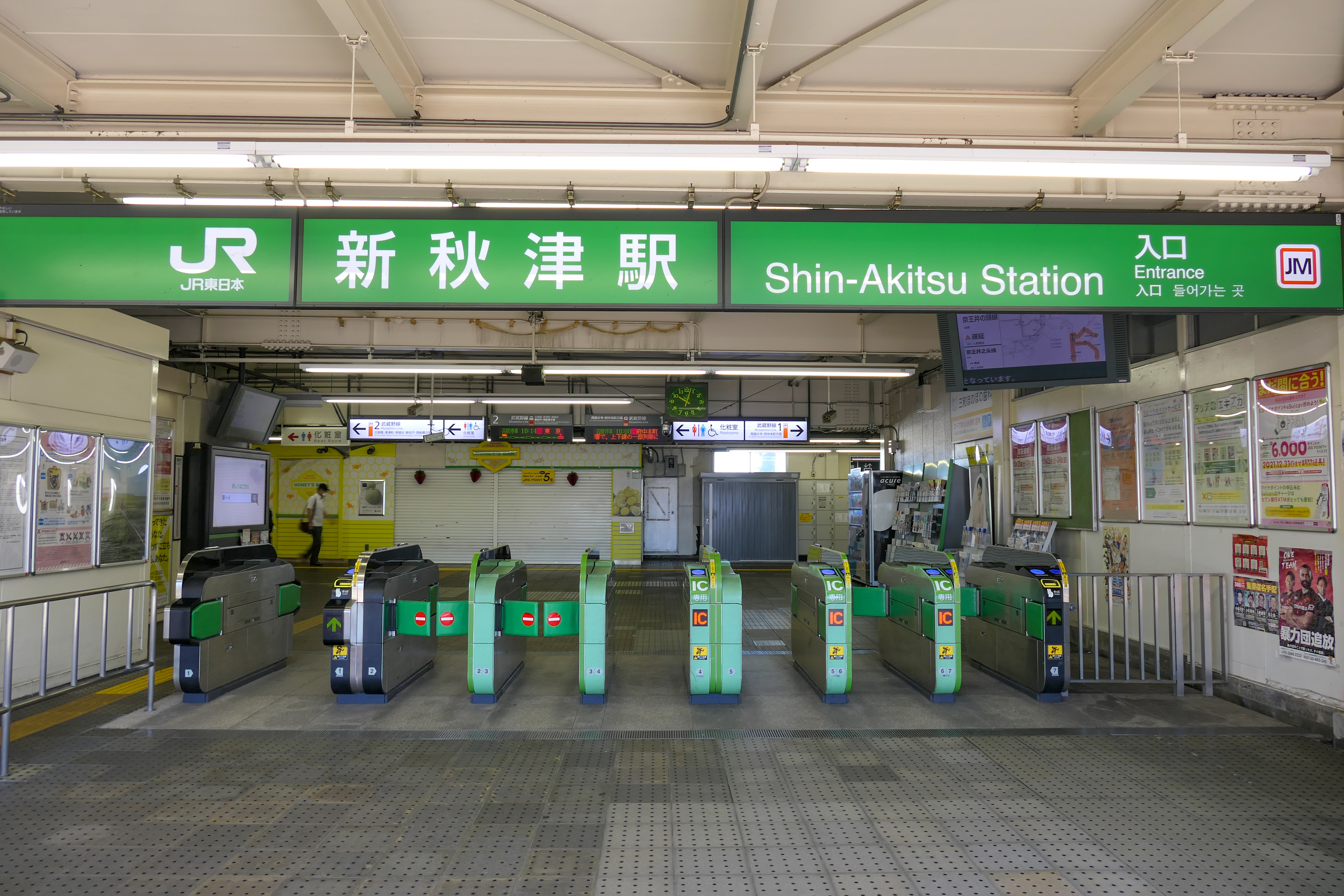
The ticket barriers, October 2021

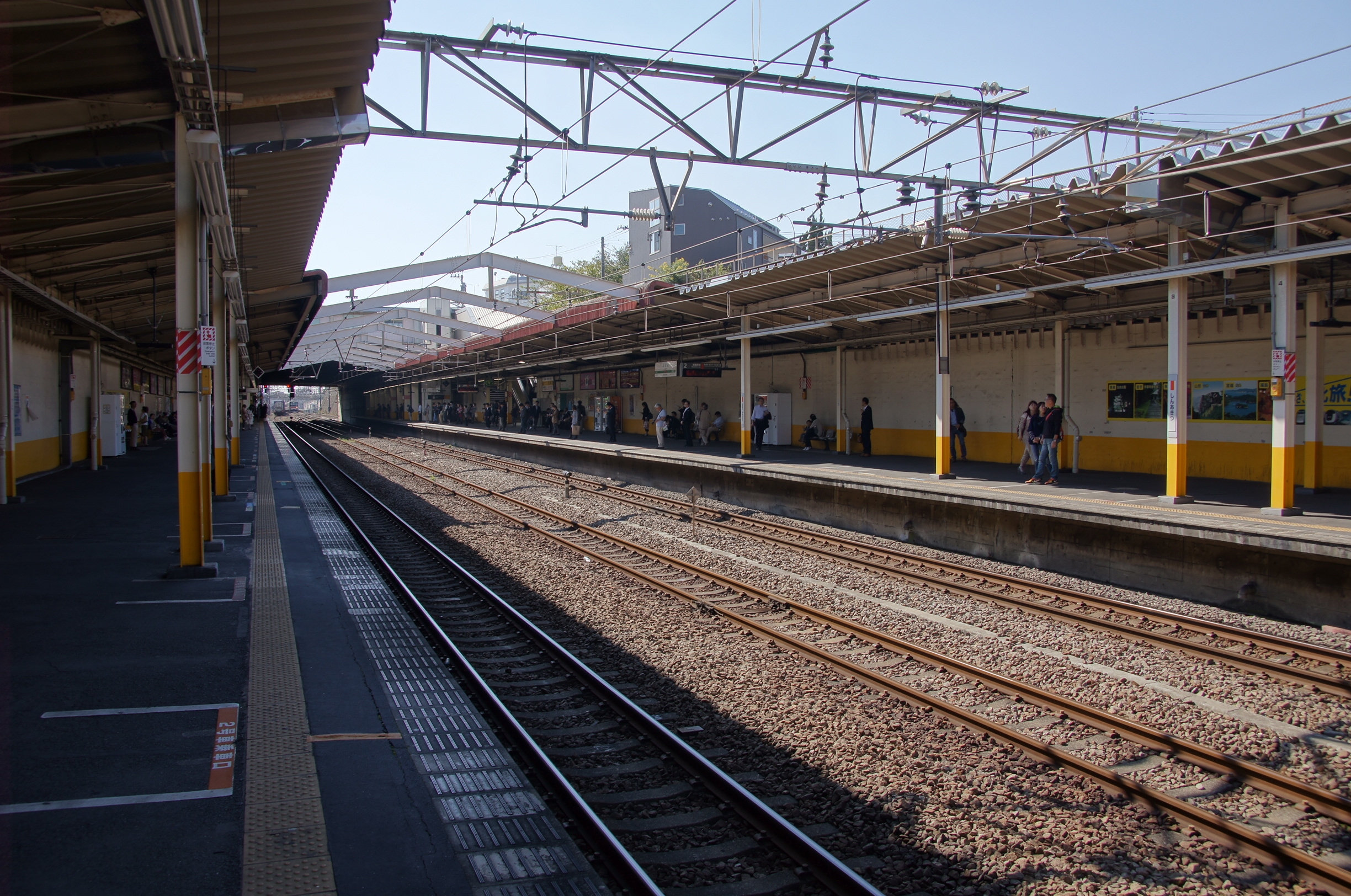
View from platform 1, October 2012

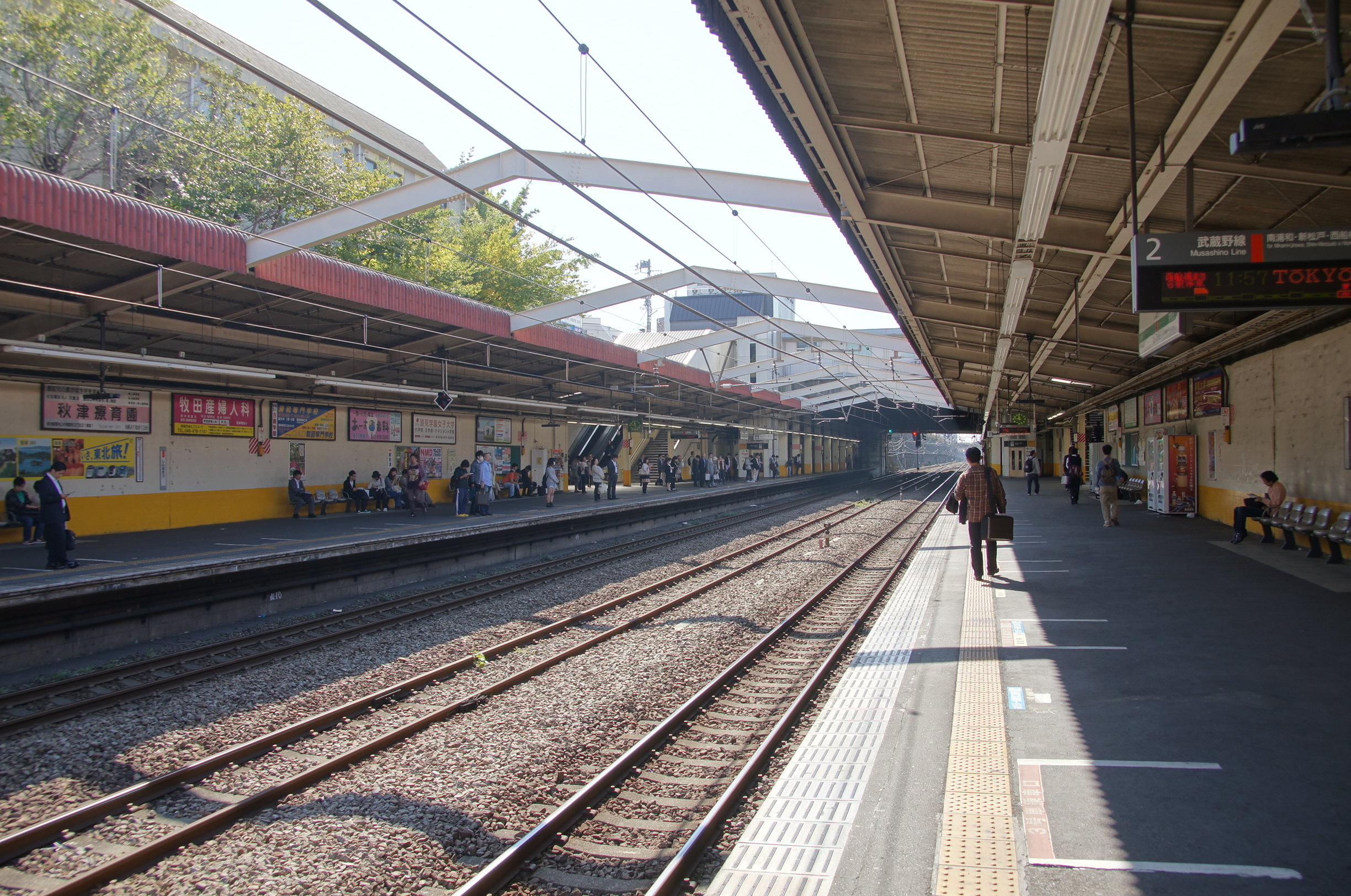
View from platform 2, October 2012

== History ==
The station opened on 1 April 1973. With the privatization of JNR on 1 April 1987, the station came under the control of JR East.

== Passenger statistics ==
In fiscal 2019, the station was used by an average of 39,069 passengers daily (boarding passengers only).

The passenger figures for previous years are as shown below.

Fiscal year	Daily average
2005	35,016
2010	36,616
2015	38,289

== Surrounding area ==
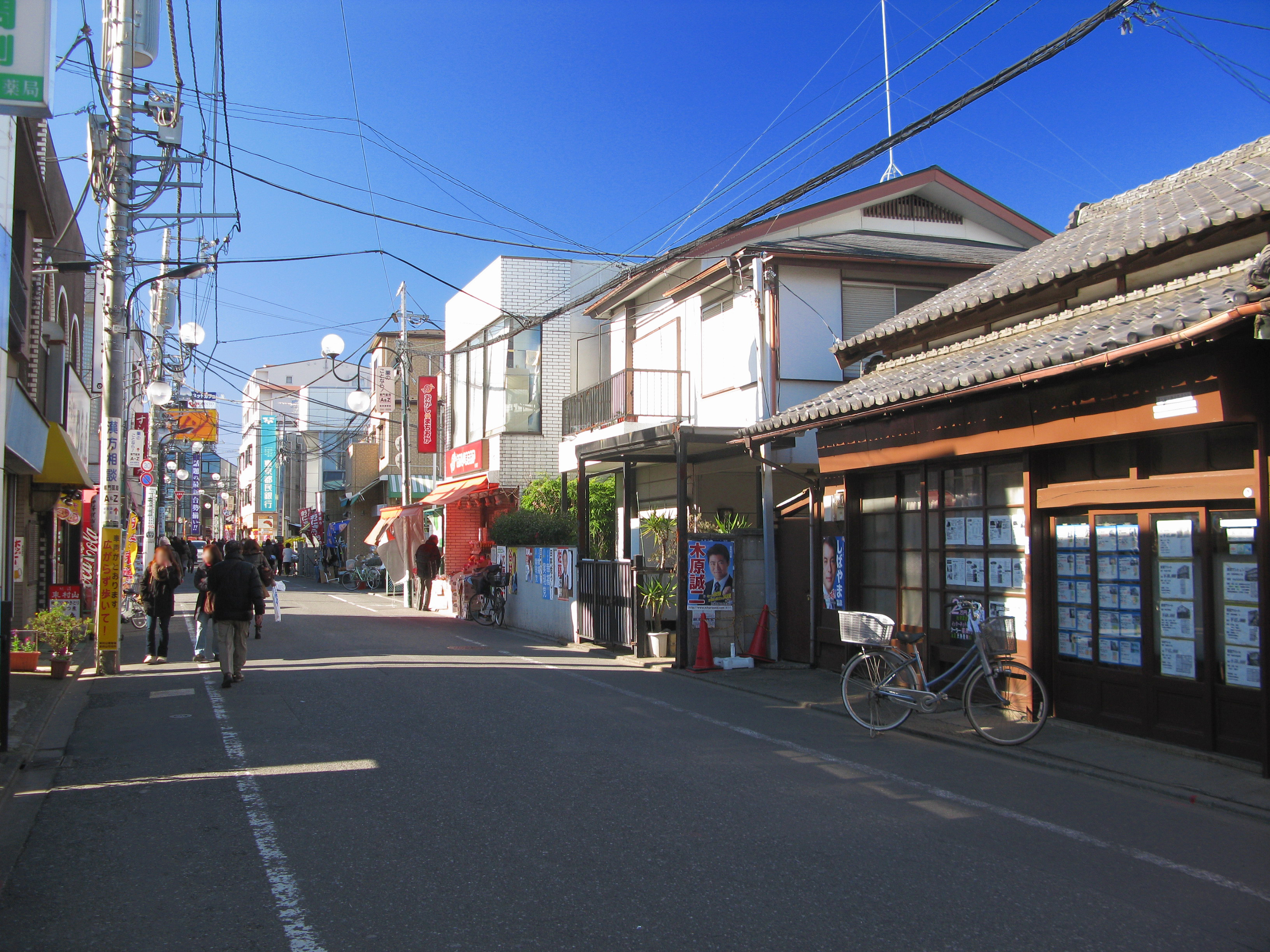
The shopping street connecting Shin-Akitsu Station with Akitsu Station

- Akitsu Station (Seibu Ikebukuro Line)
- Meiji Pharmaceutical University
- Tohsei Gakuen School
- Tama Zenshoen Sanatorium

== See also ==
- List of railway stations in Japan
