= Shin-Kodaira Station =

Railway station in Kodaira, Tokyo, Japan

JM32 Shin-Kodaira Station 新小平駅
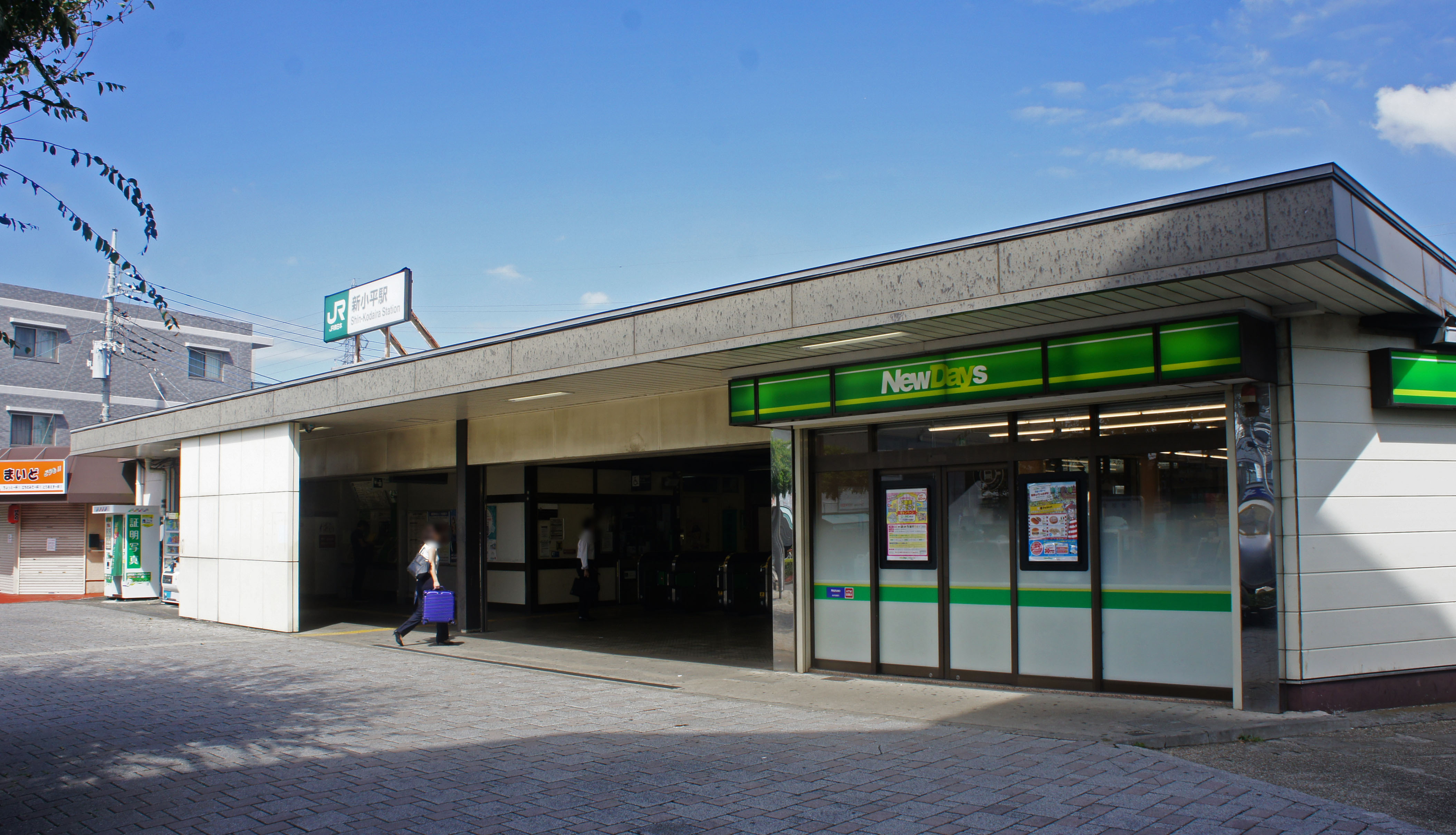
- Shin-Kodaira Station, September 2019

General information
- Location: 2-1960 Ogawa-chō, Kodaira-shi, Tokyo 187–0032; Japan
- Coordinates: 35°43′51″N 139°28′14″E
- Operator: JR East
- Line: Musashino Line
- Distance: 7.4 km from Fuchūhommachi
- Platforms: 2 side platforms

Other information
- Status: Staffed
- Website: Official website

History
- Opened: 1 April 1973

Passengers
- FY2019: 11,448

Services
Preceding station	JR East	Following station
Nishi-Kokubunji JM33 towards Fuchūhommachi	Musashino	Shin-Akitsu JM31 towards Ōmiya
Kunitachi JC18 towards Hachiōji	Musashino	Shin-Akitsu JM31 towards Ōmiya
Nishi-Kokubunji JM33 towards Fuchūhommachi	Musashino Line	Shin-Akitsu JM31 towards Kaihimmakuhari or Tokyo
Location
- Location within Tokyo Location within Japan

Shin-Kodaira Station (新小平駅, Shin-Kodaira-eki) is a passenger railway station located in the city of Kodaira, Tokyo, Japan, operated by East Japan Railway Company (JR East).

== Lines ==
Shin-Kodaira Station is served by the Musashino Line between Fuchūhommachi and Nishi-Funabashi, with some trains continuing to Tokyo via the Keiyō Line. It is 7.4 kilometers from Fuchūhommachi.

== Station layout ==
The station consists of two side platforms serving two tracks, and is located in a cutting between the 4,381 m long Higashimurayama Tunnel to the north and the 2,562 m long Kodaira Tunnel to the south.

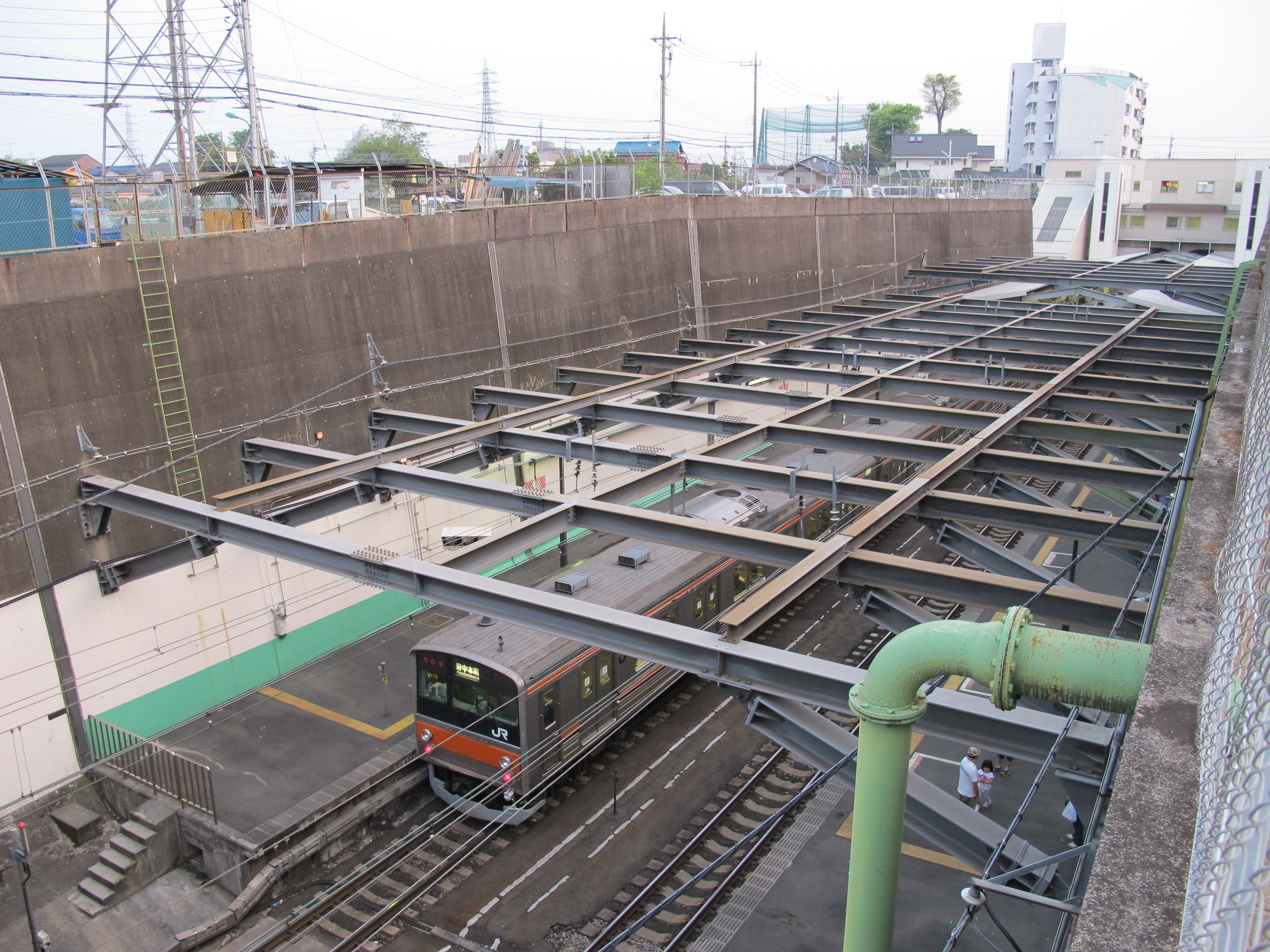
View of the sub-surface station platforms, May 2010

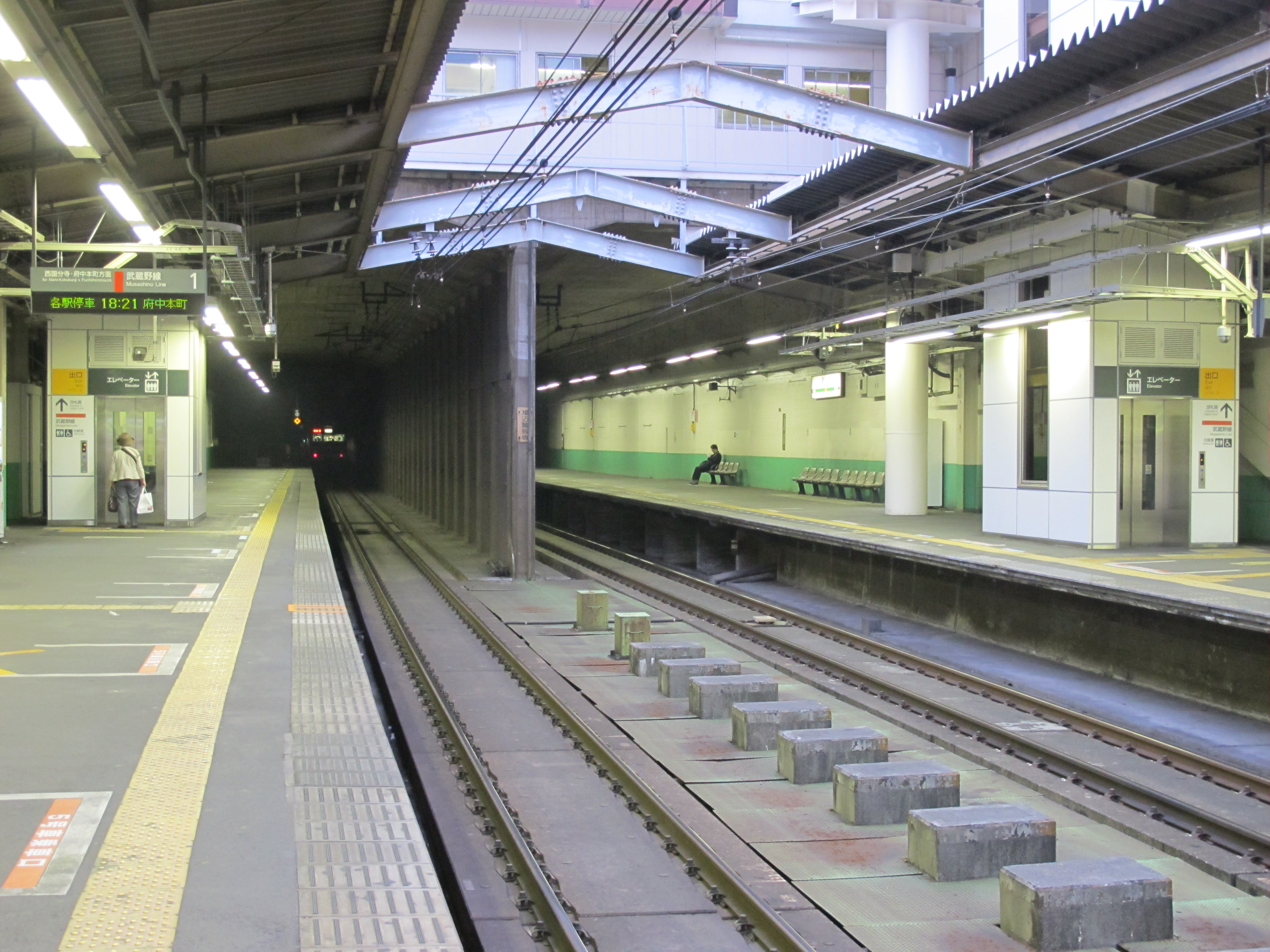
View looking toward the Kodaira Tunnel from Platform 1, May 2010

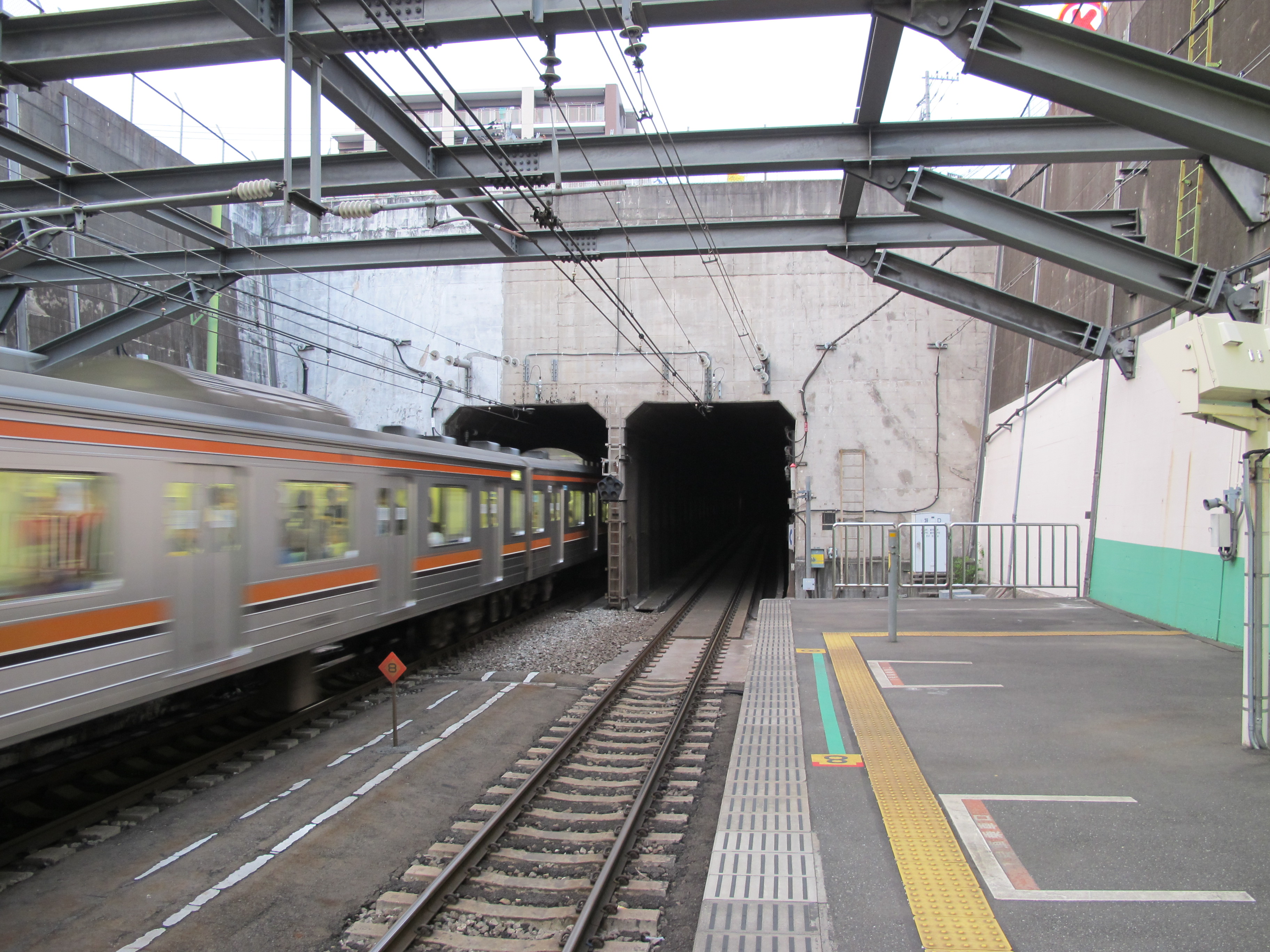
View looking toward the Higashimurayama Tunnel from Platform 1, May 2010

=== Platforms ===
1	Musashino Line	for Nishi-Kokubunji and Fuchūhommachi
2	Musashino Line	for Musashi-Urawa, Shim-Matsudo, Nishi-Funabashi, Tokyo, and Kaihimmakuhari

== History ==
The station opened on 1 April 1973.

=== October 1991 flood ===
The area had received record-setting rainfall since August 1991: 394mm in August (the sixth-highest August total in history), 447mm in September (the second-highest September total in history, and the fourth-highest in any month). In October, 200mm of rain had already fallen by the 11th, the day of the incident, due to a front associated with Typhoon 21.

By the middle of September, groundwater was leaking from the retaining walls around the northern part of the platform. At around 11:45pm on October 11th, (Note: According to the October 12, 1991 Nikkei Shimbun evening edition. Other sources give the time of the incident as 11:15pm or 11:30pm.) after 95mm of rainfall from Typhoon 21 within the previous 24 hours, a 120-meter length of the station structure had bulged upward by up to 1.3 meters. (Note: The uplift reached its maximum in the following days, eventually reaching up to 2 meters.) Gaps of up to 70cm opened in the retaining wall seams, and sediment-laden groundwater began pouring in at up to 8 tons per minute. Some residents of the surrounding area had to evacuate due to the appearance of sinkholes. Because the incident happened late at night, however, no trains were running.

Attempts to drain the water using a large number of submersible pumps were unsuccessful, as the pumps could not keep up with the influx. To lower the groundwater level, eight deep wells were drilled, and 8 tons of water per minute were discharged into the sewer system. This still proved insufficient, so 11 more wells were drilled, increasing the discharge rate to 15 tons per minute, and the water was instead discharged into the Karabori River, 2km away from the station.

By the middle of November, the groundwater had subsided enough for construction to reach full speed, and by December 11th, the station was restored. At first, restoration had been expected to take 6 months, but in view of the Musashino Line's importance for freight transportation, construction was expedited and carried out around the clock. Restoration was completed in about one month.

JR East incurred an estimated 3.5 billion yen worth of damage from the incident.

==== Cause ====
The station is a U-shaped structure made of reinforced concrete. Half of its depth is embedded within the Musashino gravel stratum, underneath the Kantō loam on the surface. Within the Musashino gravel, the groundwater level varies greatly with rainfall. On the day of the flood, the groundwater had risen to less than 3m below the surface, its highest level in 75 years.

The Musashino Line runs north-south through the area, and acts as a dam against the west-east flow of groundwater. The structure experienced buoyancy from the rising water. The northern part of the station is uncovered and thus the weakest part of the structure, and incurred the most damage.

==== Prevention ====
As part of the station's restoration, measures were taken to prevent a reoccurrence of the disaster even in high-groundwater conditions.

To counteract the structure's buoyancy, earth anchors were driven down through the platforms and the Musashino gravel stratum. Drainage equipment and strain sensors were installed within the retaining walls. After the groundwater subsided, a 1m upward bulge remained in the station's U-shaped concrete structure. Around the bulge, the bottom of the structure was cut out, the slab track was replaced with ballasted track, and a steel frame was added above the platforms to support the retaining walls. More than half of the station's structure was rebuilt during the operation.

South of Shin-Kodaira Station, the Kunitachi Branch Line runs in a tunnel even longer than the Kodaira Tunnel, obstructing the west-to-east flow of groundwater. This effect caused frequent inundation in the town of Nishi-Koigakubo, in Kokubunji, but it was reduced by the measures JR East took to protect Shin-Kodaira from flooding.

==== Diversion during line closure ====
During the two months it took to restore service, the Musashino Line operated in two segments: between Tokyo or Shin-Narashino and Shin-Akitsu, and between Nishi-Kokubunji and Fuchūhommachi. Substitute buses operated between Shin-Akitsu and Nishi-Kokubunji, stopping at Shin-Kodaira. This created chronic congestion in the towns of Kumegawa and Koigakubo, along Tokyo Metropolitan and Saitama Prefectural Route 17, and meant that it could take around an hour to travel between two stations. As a result, many passengers instead walked to Akitsu Station, took the Seibu Ikebukuro Line to Tokorozawa, then the Seibu Shinjuku Line to Higashi-Murayama, then the Seibu Kokubunji Line (Note: The Kokubunji Line normally operated 4-car trains during the daytime, but switched to operating 6-car trains all day during the diversion period.) to Kokubunji, and finally the JR Chūō Line to Nishi-Kokubunji. Since alternate transportation was available, commuter passes were not extended.

Although there is a connecting track from the Musashino Line to the Seibu Ikebukuro Line at Shin-Akitsu, (Note: This track is sometimes used to move equipment to and from the Seibu Tamagawa Line) and the remains of a connecting track between the Seibu Kokubunji Line and the Chūō Line at Kokubunji, (Note: The track was removed when the JR part of Kokubunji Station was converted to two island platforms.) no special service was operated through the Seibu Railway. There was a plan to introduce a temporary connecting passageway between Shin-Akitsu and Akitsu stations, but it was dropped amid opposition from local merchants, who feared it might become permanent.

Freight trains were rerouted via the Yamanote Freight Line, the Hachikō Line, and others, but spare capacity was limited, and other lines they ran on (the Chūō Line, Jōban Line, and Sōbu Main Line) had operational restrictions as well. (Note: The Yamanote Freight Line was full (the Musashino Line had been built to bypass it). The Hachikō Line was single-track and included an unelectrified section, so little of it was usable. The Chūō Line carried many limited express and rapid trains and thus would have required high-speed freight locomotives. The Jōban Line would have required dual-voltage locomotives to go beyond Toride. The Sōbu Main Line had a tight schedule, single-track branch lines, and partially incompatible signaling.) 28 of the normal 113 freight trains were suspended throughout the Musashino Line closure, and others were substituted with trucks.

== Passenger statistics ==
In fiscal 2019, the station was used by an average of 11,448 passengers daily (boarding passengers only). The passenger figures for previous years are as shown below.

Fiscal year	Daily average
2000	9,326
2005	10,496
2010	11,146
2015	11,429

== Surrounding area ==
- Ōmekaidō Station (on the Seibu Tamako Line)
- Tsuda College
- Kodaira Hirakushi Denchu Art Museum

== See also ==
- List of railway stations in Japan
