= Kita-Fuchū Station =

Railway station in Fuchū, Tokyo, Japan

JM34 Kita-Fuchū Station 北府中駅
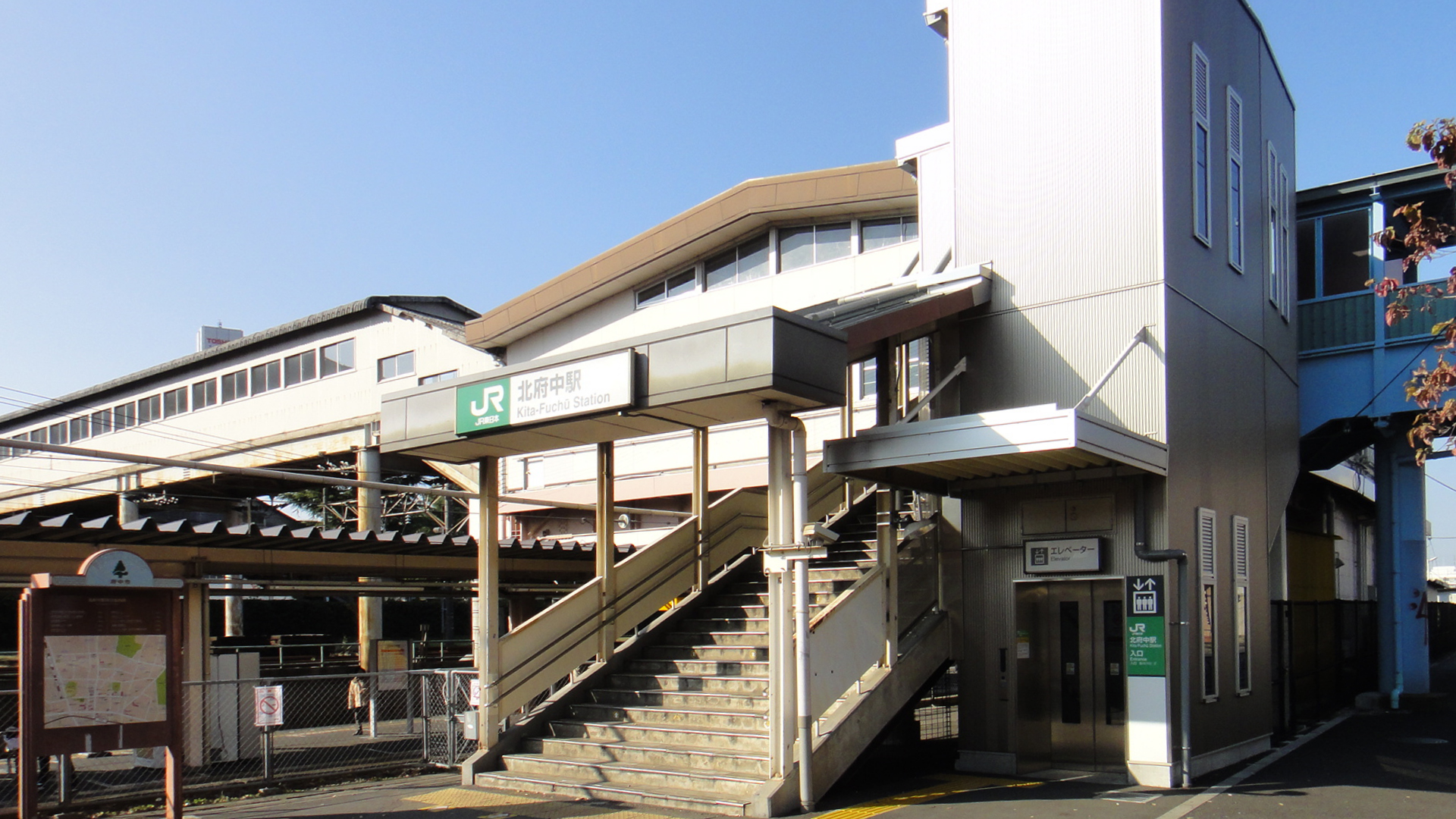
- Kita-Fuchū Station entrance in November 2012

General information
- Location: 2 Harumi-chō, Fuchū-shi, Tokyo 183-0057; Japan
- Coordinates: 35.6810°N 139.4720°E
- Operator: JR East
- Line: Musashino Line
- Distance: 1.7 km from Fuchūhommachi
- Platforms: 1 island platform
- Tracks: 2
- Connections: Bus stop

Other information
- Status: Staffed
- Website: Official website

History
- Opened: 1 September 1956

Passengers
- FY2019: 15,064 daily

Services
Preceding station	JR East	Following station
Fuchūhommachi JM35 Terminus	Musashino	Nishi-Kokubunji JM33 towards Ōmiya
Fuchūhommachi JM35 Terminus	Musashino Line	Nishi-Kokubunji JM33 towards Kaihimmakuhari or Tokyo
Location
- Location within Tokyo Location within Japan

Kita-Fuchū Station (北府中駅, Kita-Fuchū-eki) is a passenger railway station located in the city of Fuchū, Tokyo, Japan, operated by East Japan Railway Company (JR East).

== Lines ==
Kita-Fuchū Station is served by the orbital Musashino Line from Fuchūhommachi to Nishi-Funabashi and Tokyo, and is situated 1.7 kilometres (1.1 mi) from the western terminus of the line at Fuchū-Hommachi.

== Station layout ==
The station consists of a single island platform serving two tracks. The station entrance is on the east side of the tracks, and the station is linked to the Toshiba Fuchu Plant entrance on the west side by an overbridge that is only for Toshiba employees. The station is staffed.

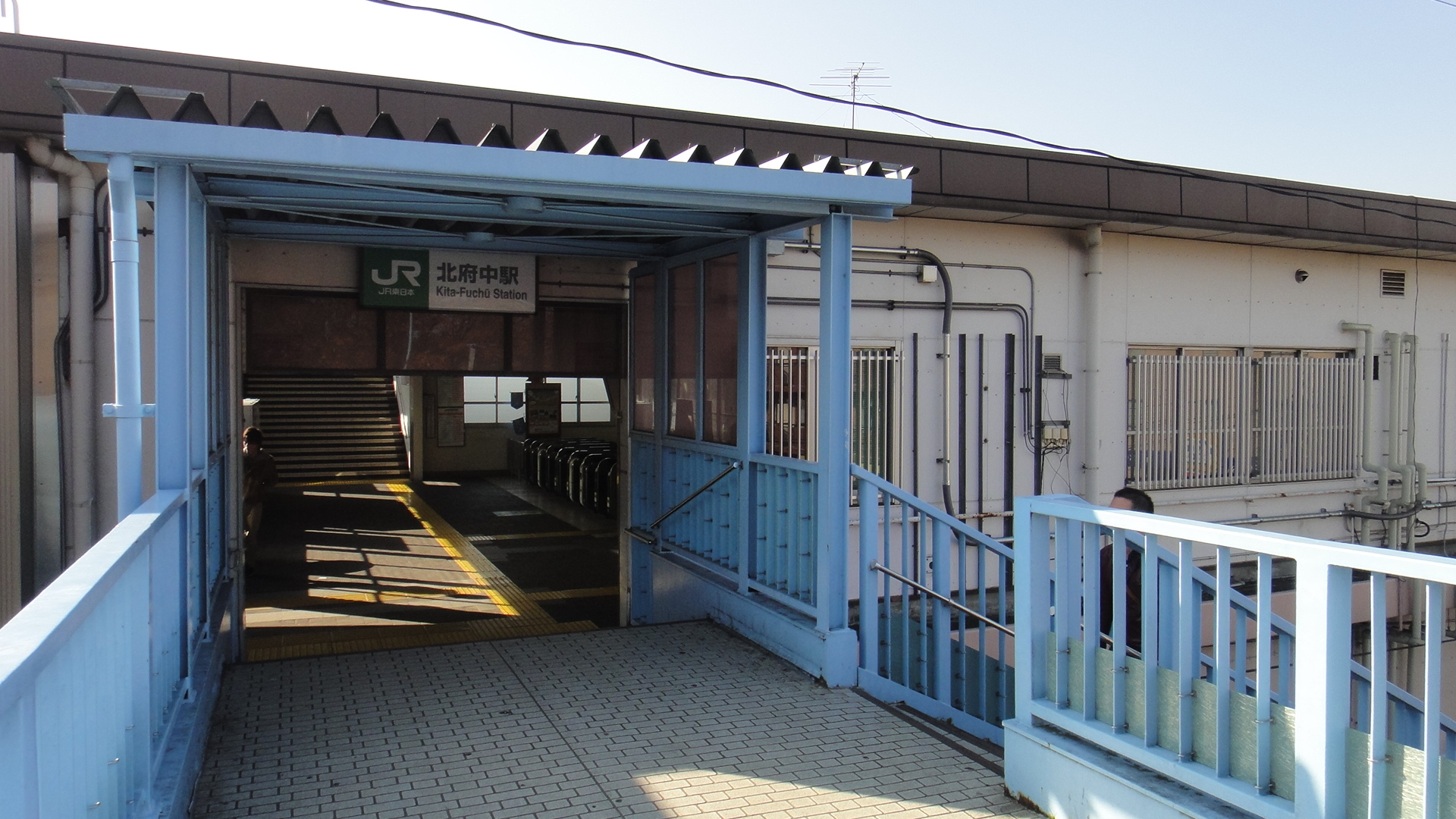
The upper entrance in November 2012

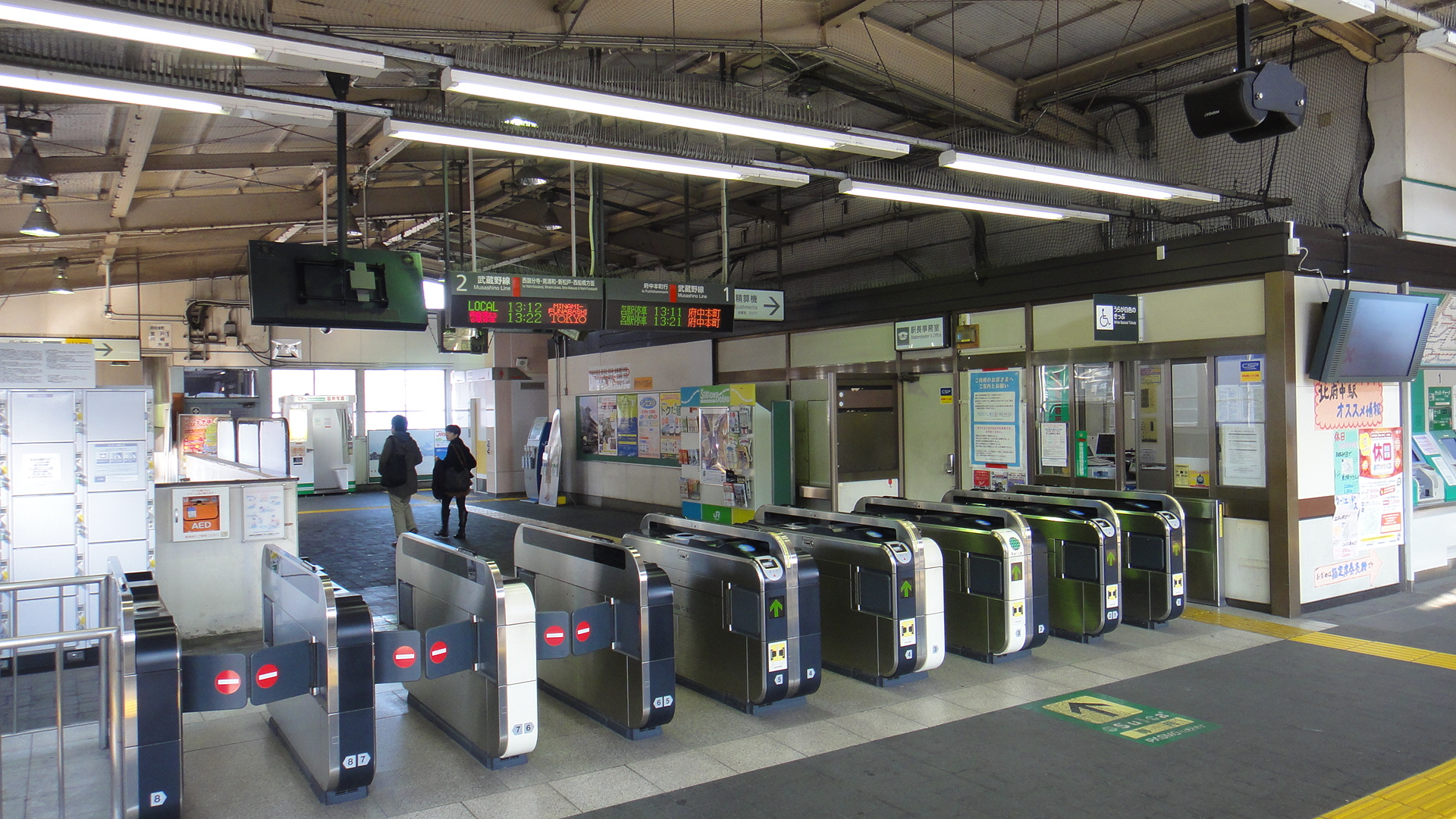
The ticket barriers in November 2012

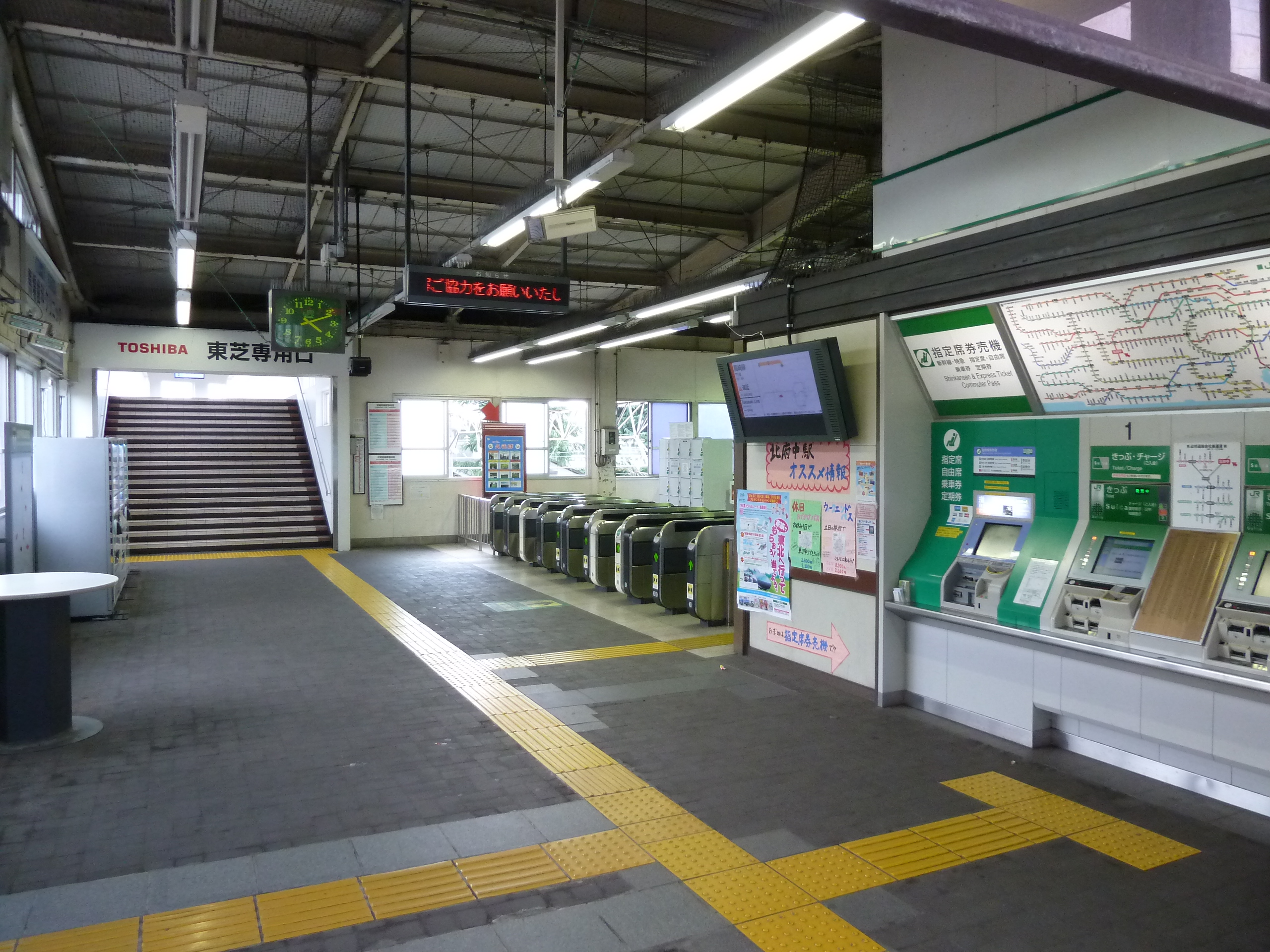
The station concourse in July 2012

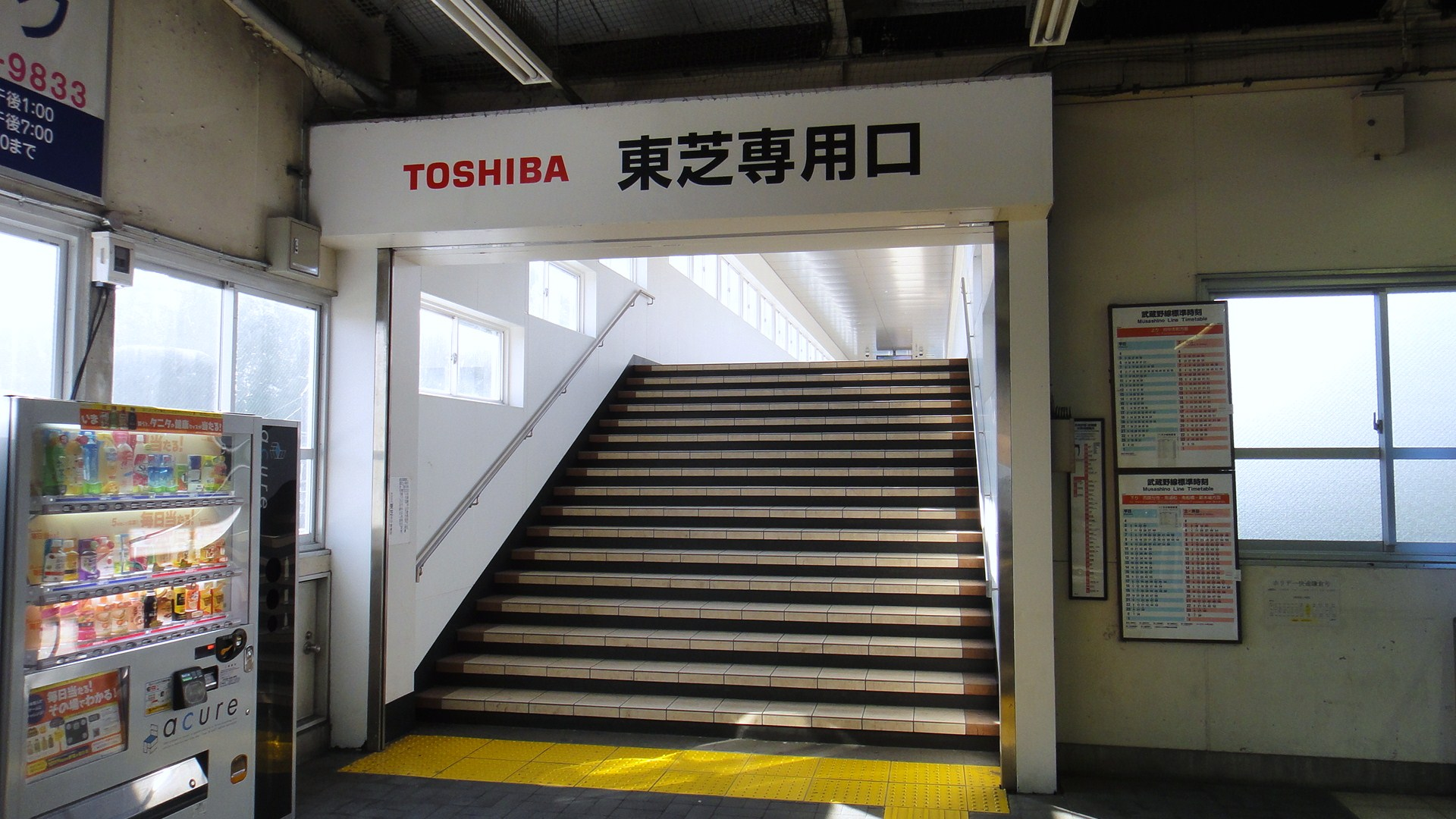
The Toshiba employee-only passageway in November 2012

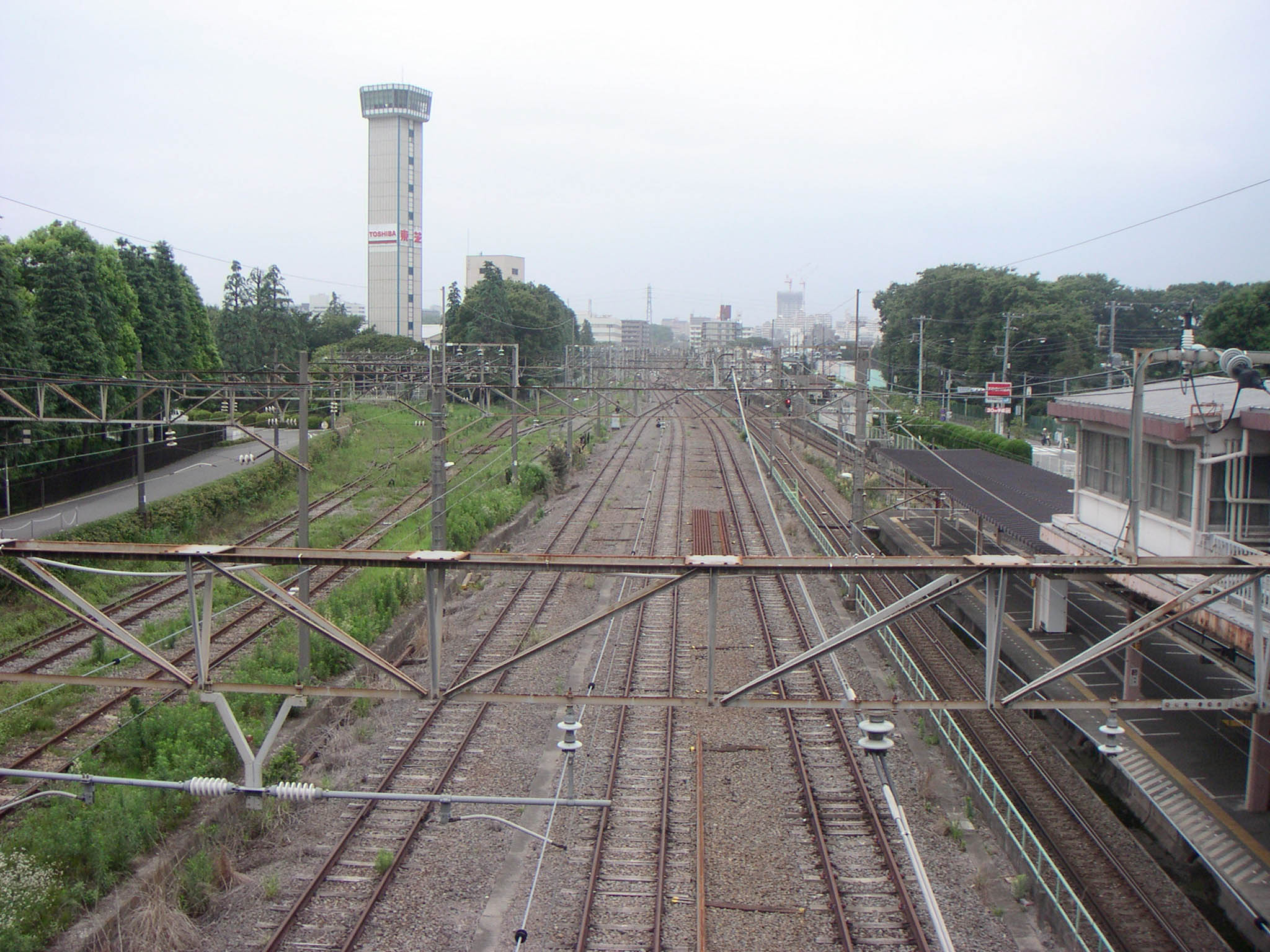
An overview of the station, with the Toshiba plant on the left

=== Platforms ===
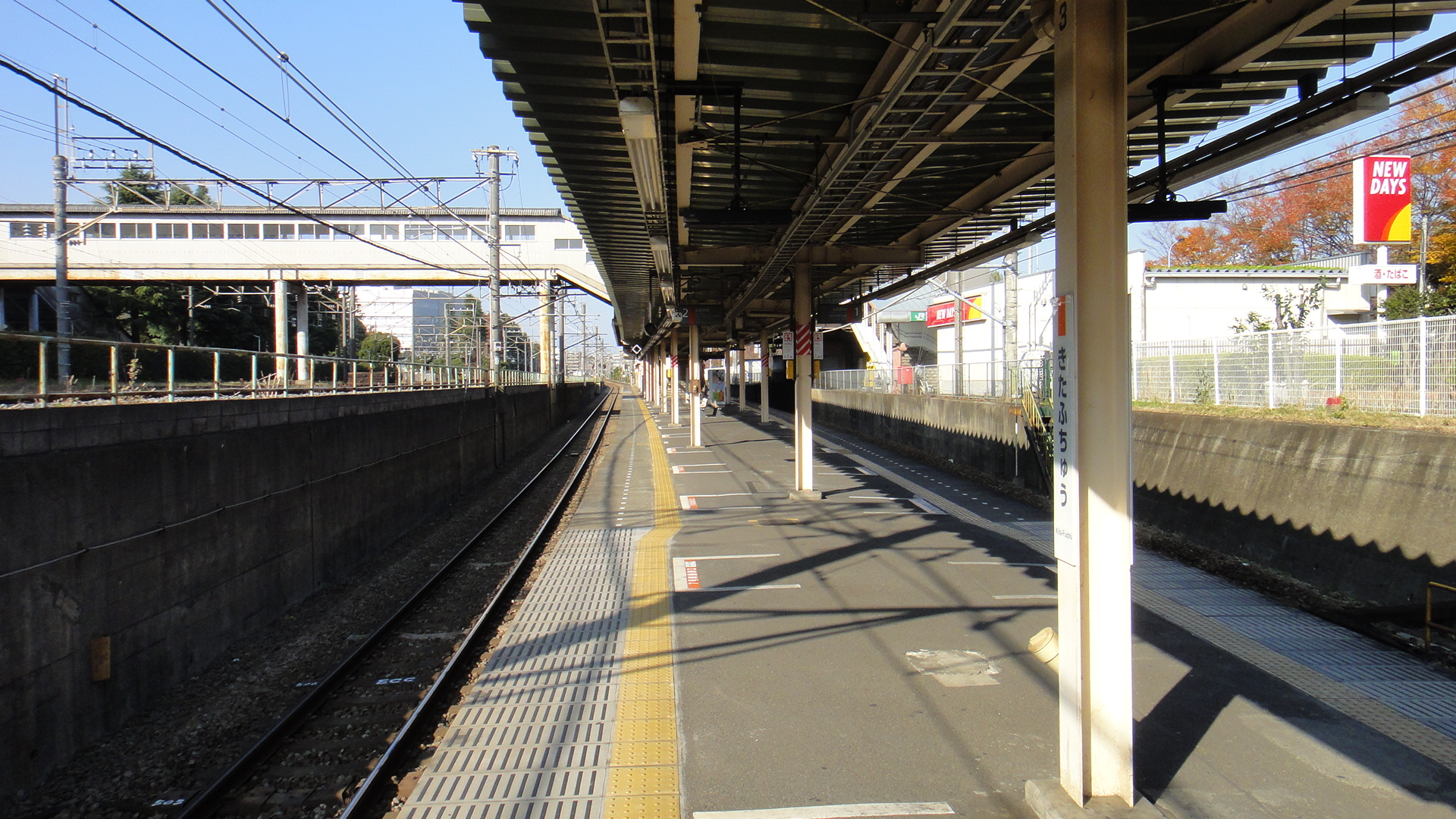
The platforms looking north in November 2012

1	Musashino Line	for Fuchūhommachi
2	Musashino Line	for Nishi-Kokubunji, Shim-Matsudo, and Nishi-Funabashi

== History ==
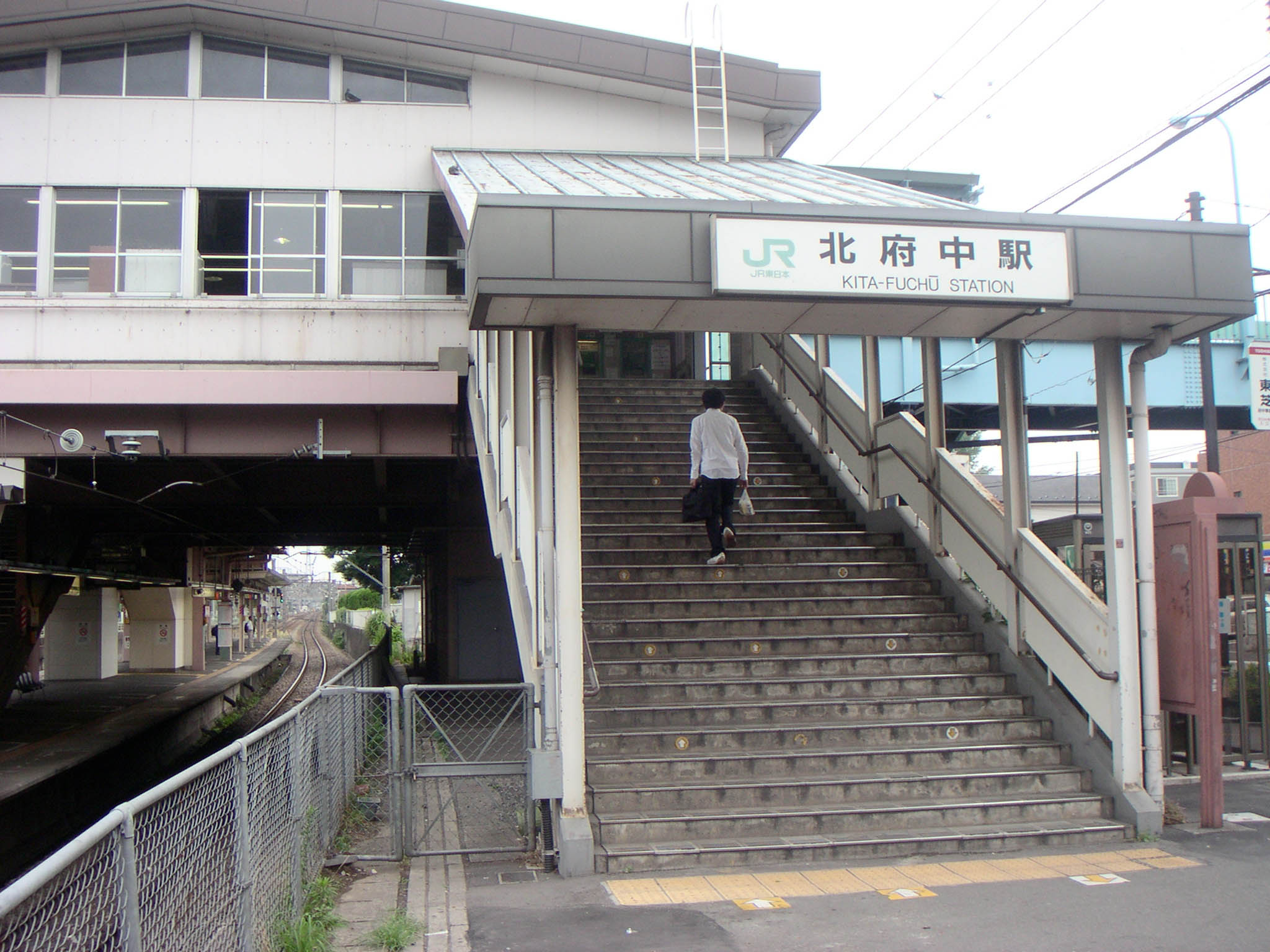
The station entrance in July 2005 before the addition of a passenger lift

The station opened on 1 September 1956, initially as a station on a branch line from the Chuo Main Line known as the Shimogawara Line (下河原線). The line became part of the Musashino Line from 1 April 1973. With the privatization of JNR on 1 April 1987, the station came under the control of JR East.

== Passenger statistics ==
In fiscal 2019, the station was used by an average of 15,064 passengers daily (boarding passengers only). The passenger figures (boarding passengers only) for previous years are as shown below.

Fiscal year	Daily average
2000	11,316
2005	11,387
2010	13,610
2015	15,090

== Surrounding area ==
- Toshiba Fuchu factory
- Fuchu Prison
- United Nations Asia and Far East Institute for the Prevention of Crime and the Treatment of Offenders
- The Ministry of Justice Training Institute for Correction Officials

=== Parks ===
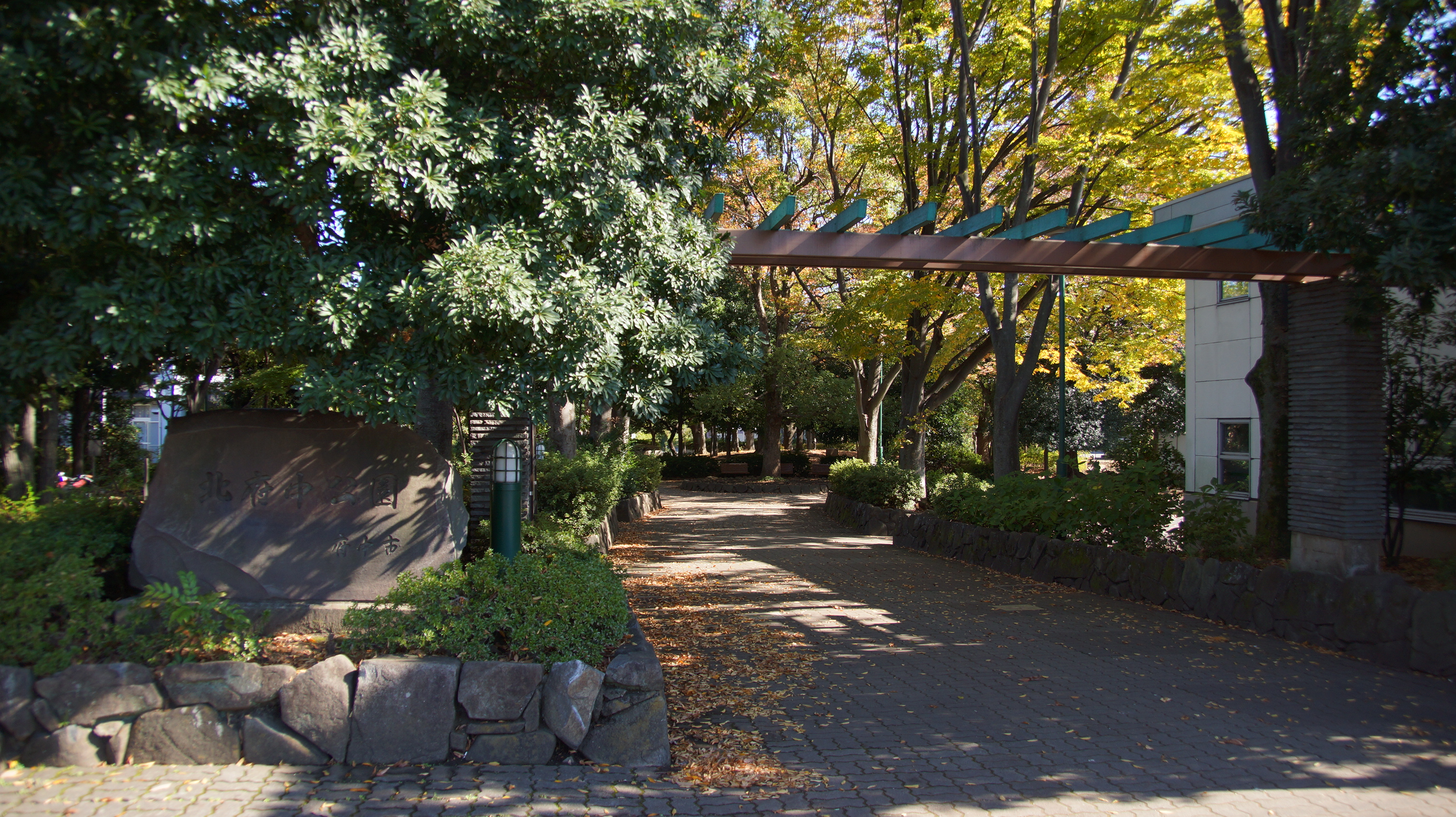
The entrance to Kita-Fuchu Park adjacent to Kita-Fuchu Station in November 2014

- Kita-Fuchu Park
- Fuchu-Chuo park
- Fuchu Park
- Suzukake Park

=== Schools and colleges ===
- Tokyo University of Agriculture and Technology
- Fuchu High School
- Nogyo High School
- Fuchu No. 1 Junior High School
- Fuchu No. 4 Junior High School
- Fuchu No. 1 Elementary School
- Fuchu No. 9 Elementary School

=== Bus services ===
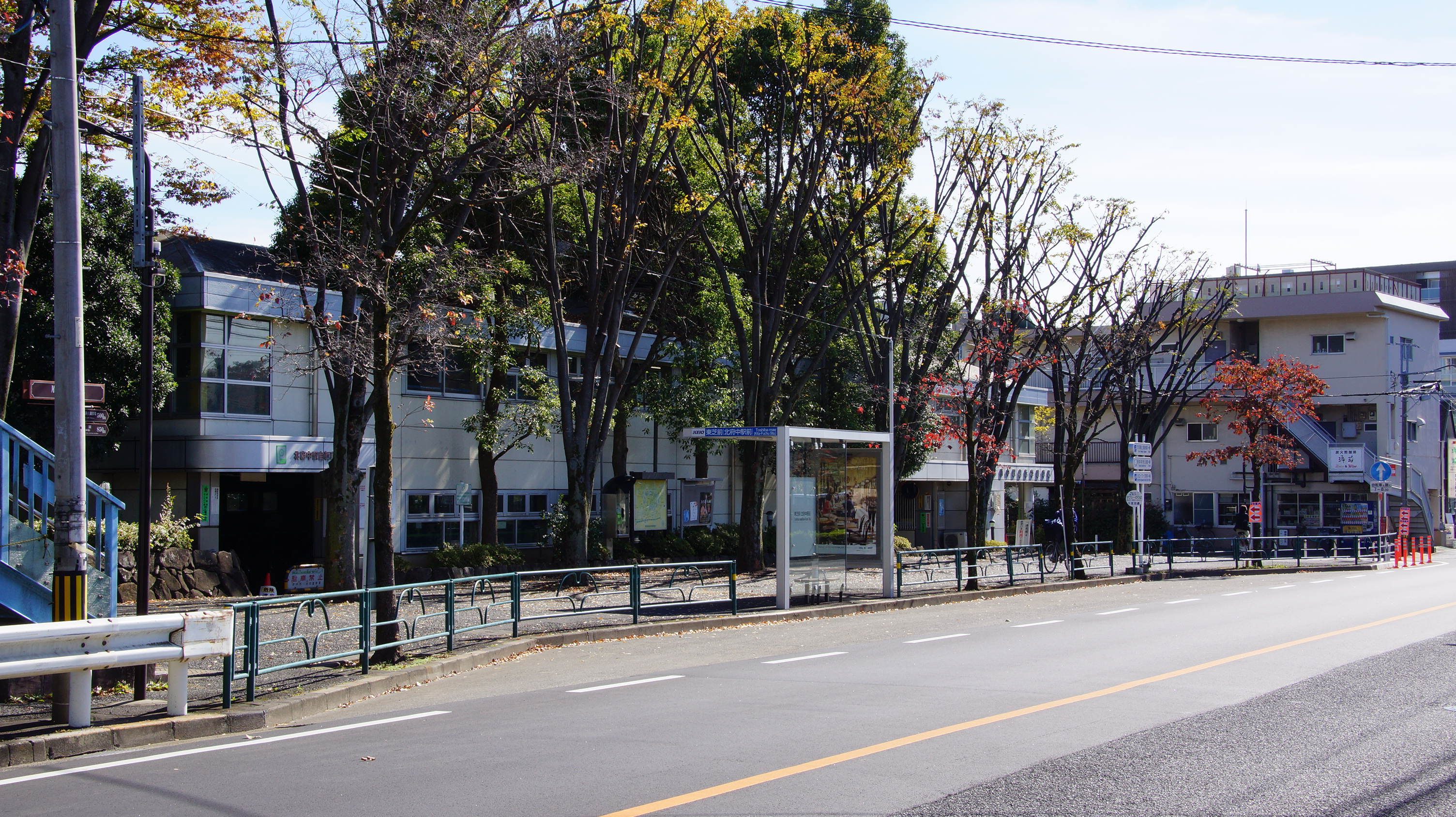
The southbound Keio bus stop adjacent to Kita-Fuchu Station in November 2014

Kita-Fuchū Station is served by Keio Bus services, which stop next to the station.

== See also ==
- List of railway stations in Japan
