= Kunitachi Station =

Railway station in Kunitachi, Tokyo, Japan

JC18 Kunitachi Station 国立駅
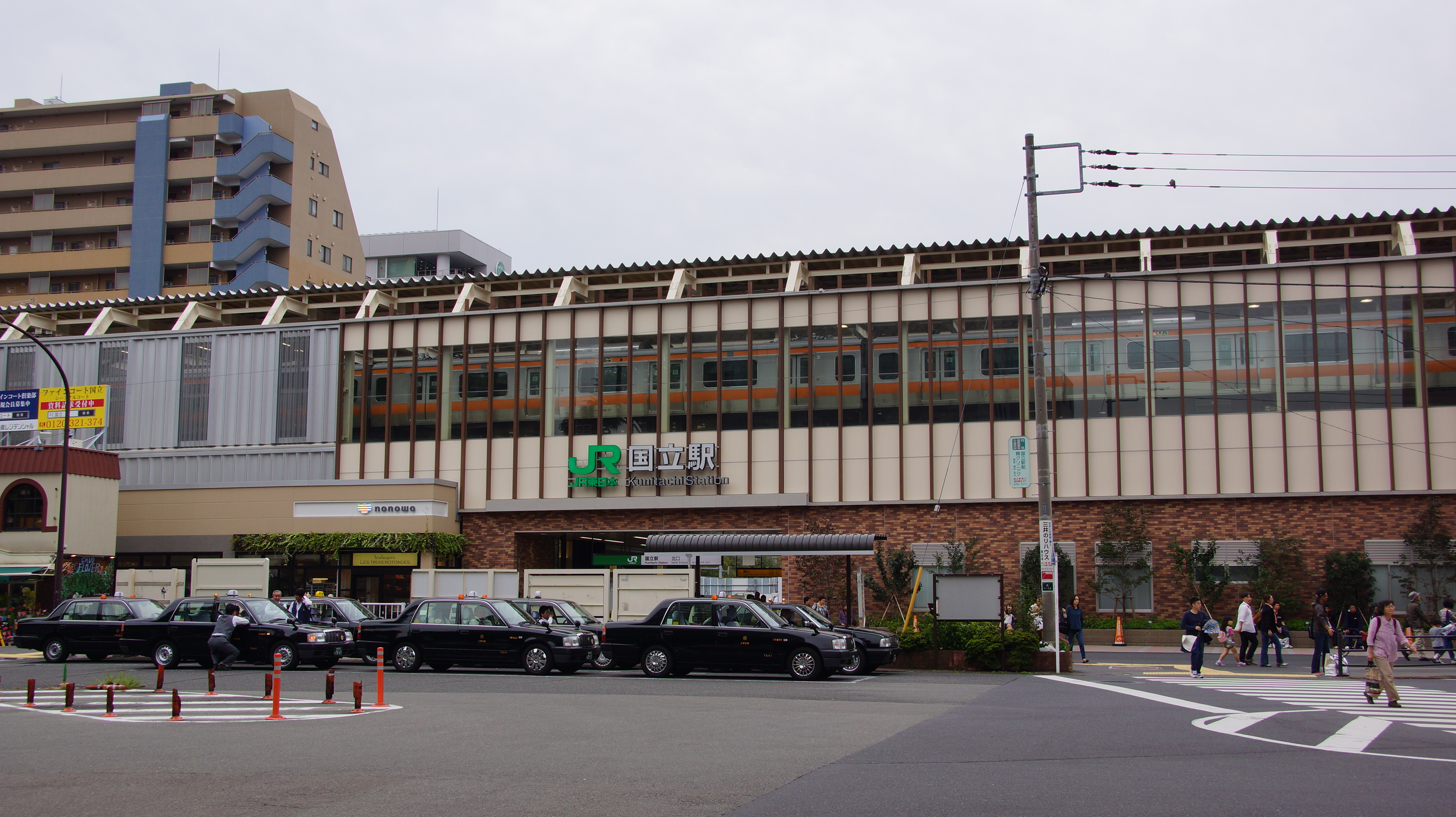
- The north entrance and station forecourt in October 2015

Japanese name
- Shinjitai: 国立駅
- Kyūjitai: 國立驛
- Hiragana: くにたちえき

General information
- Location: 1-14-22 Kita, Kunitachi City, Tokyo; Japan
- Coordinates: 35°41′58″N 139°26′48″E
- Operator: JR East
- Line: Chūō Line (Rapid)
- Distance: 34.5 km (21.4 mi) from Tokyo
- Platforms: 3
- Tracks: 3

Other information
- Status: Staffed (Midori no Madoguchi)
- Website: Official website

History
- Opened: 1 April 1926

Passengers
- FY2024: 97,096 (daily) ▲3.08%

Services
| Preceding station | JR East | Following station |
|---|---|---|
| Tachikawa JC19 towards Ōtsuki | Chūō Line Rapid | Nishi-Kokubunji JC17 towards Tokyo |
| Tachikawa JC19 towards Hachiōji | Musashino | Shin-Kodaira JM32 towards Ōmiya |
Location
- Location within Tokyo Location within Kanto Area Location within Japan

Kunitachi Station (国立駅, Kunitachi-eki) is a passenger railway station located in the city of Kunitachi, Tokyo, Japan, operated by East Japan Railway Company (JR East).

== Lines ==
Kunitachi Station is served by the Chūō Line (Rapid). It is 34.5 kilometers from the terminus of the line at Tokyo Station.

== Station layout ==
The station has one elevated side platform (platform 1) and one island platform (platforms 2 and 3), serving a total of three tracks. The station has a Midori no Madoguchi staffed ticket office.

=== Platforms ===
| 1 | Chūō Line (Rapid) | for Tachikawa, Hachiōji, and Takao |
| 2/3 | Chūō Line (Rapid) | for Mitaka, Shinjuku and Tokyo |

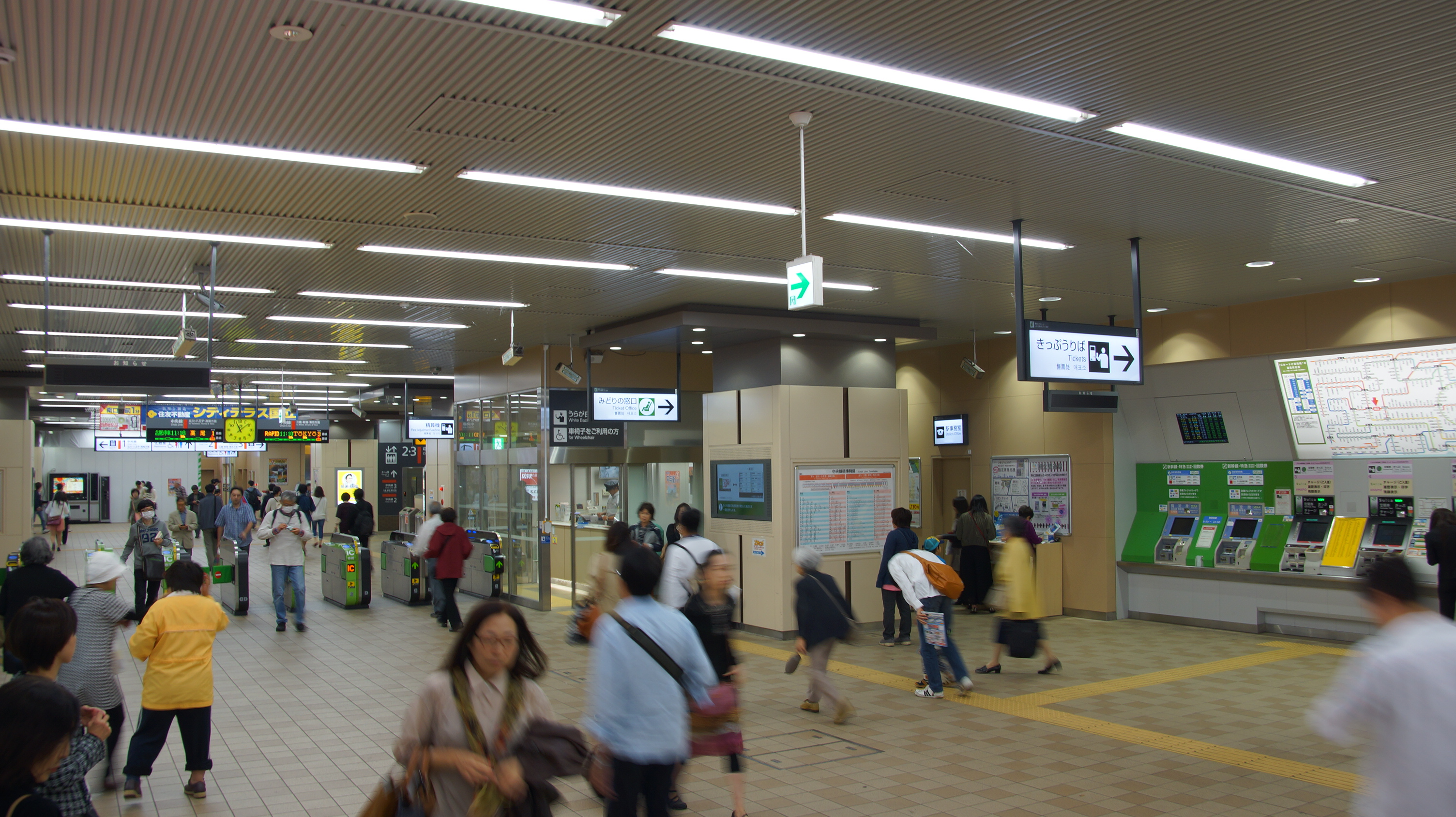
The ticket barriers, October 2015

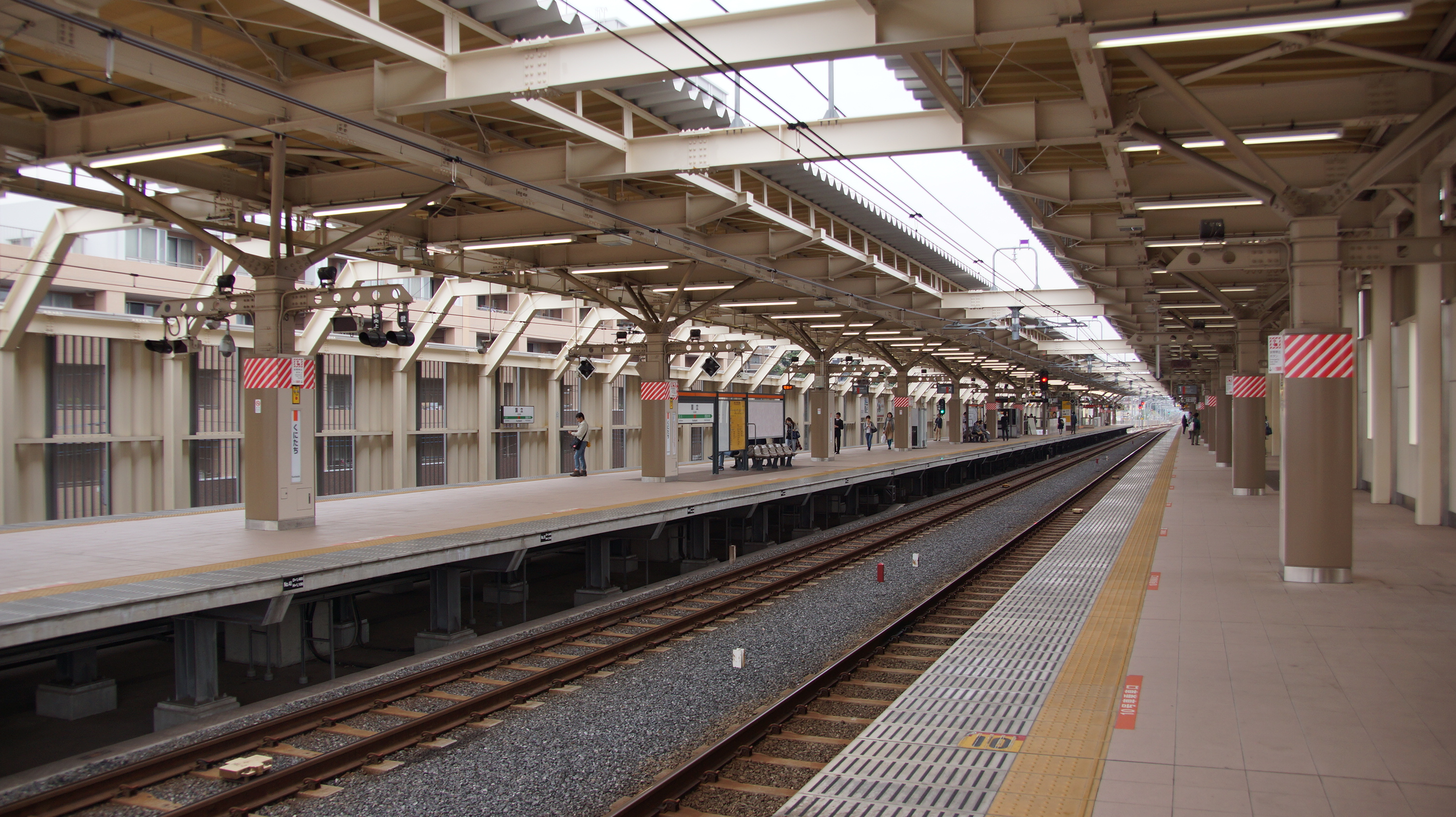
The view looking east from the west (Hachioji) end of platform 1, October 2015

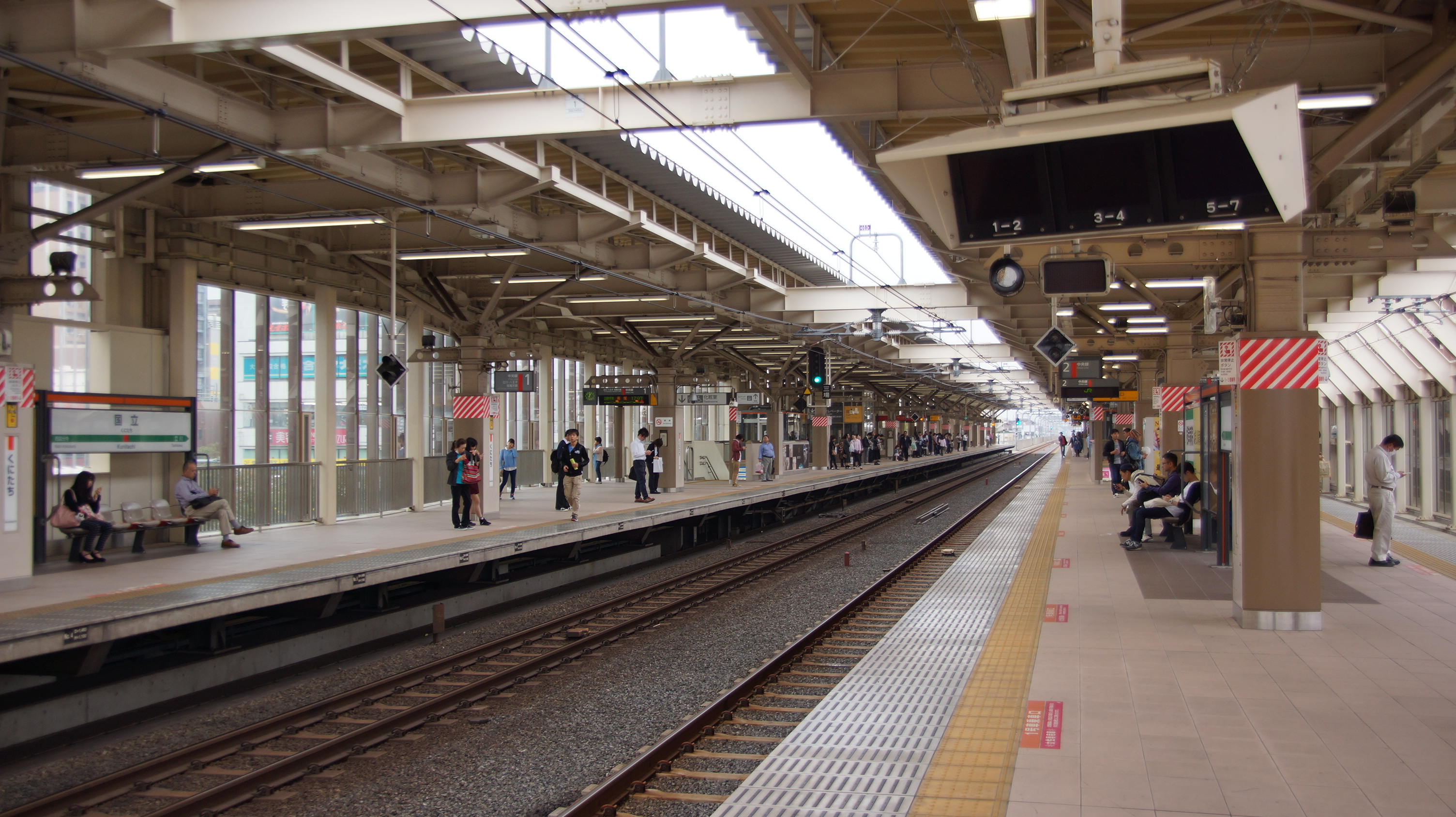
The view looking west from the east (Shinjuku) end of platforms 2 and 3, October 2015

== History ==
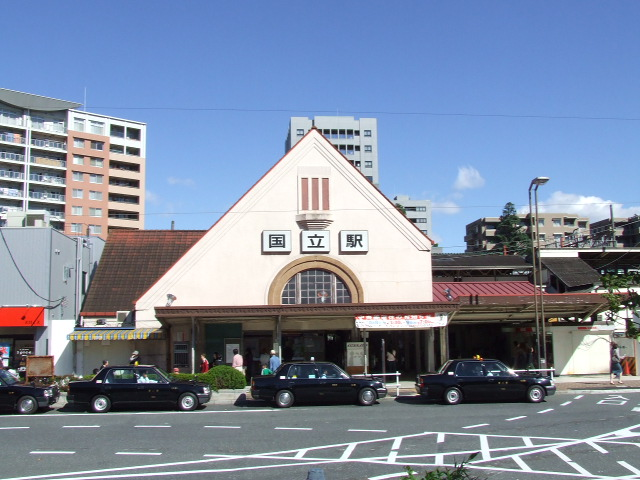
The south side of the station in 2006 before rebuilding

Kunitachi Station opened on 1 April 1926. It was named by taking one kanji from the names of the stations of either station adjacent to it at the time (Kokubunji and Tachikawa). With the privatization of Japanese National Railways (JNR) on 1 April 1987, the station came under the control of JR East.

== Passenger statistics ==
In fiscal 2019, the JR station was used by an average of 53,532 passengers daily (boarding passengers only) making it the 67th busiest JR East station.

== Surrounding area ==
- Railway Technical Research Institute
- Hitotsubashi University Kunitachi campus

== See also ==
- List of railway stations in Japan
