= Nishi-Kokubunji Station =

Railway station in Kokubunji, Tokyo, Japan

JC17 JM33 Nishi-Kokubunji Station 西国分寺駅
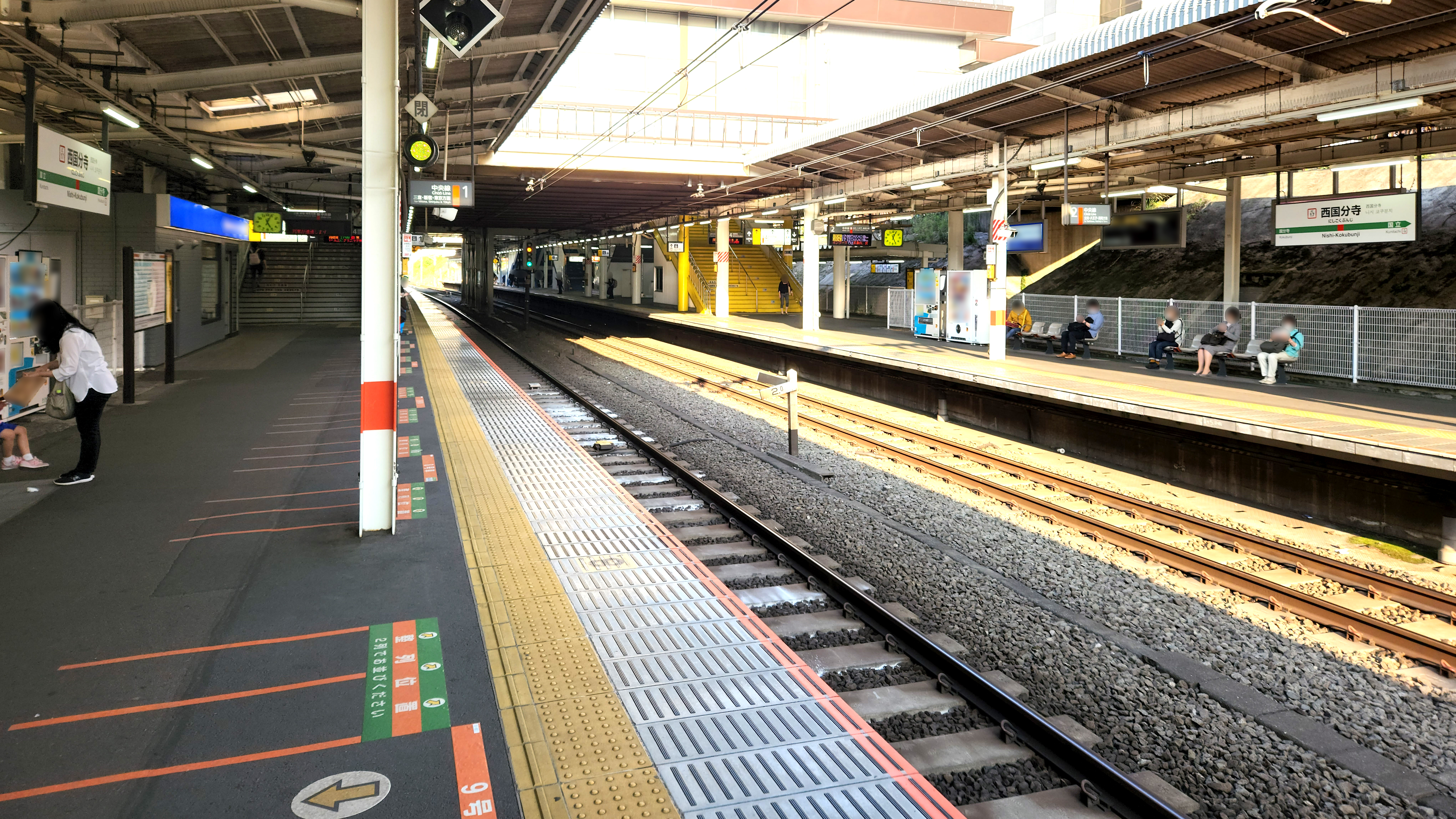
- The Chūō Line platforms in May 2022

Japanese name
- Shinjitai: 西国分寺駅
- Kyūjitai: 西國分寺驛
- Hiragana: にしこくぶんじえき

General information
- Location: 2 Nishi-Koigakubo, Kokubunji City, Tokyo 185–0013; Japan
- Coordinates: 35°41′59″N 139°27′57″E
- Operator: JR East
- Lines: Chūō Line (Rapid); Musashino Line
- Distance: 32.8 km (20.4 mi) from Tokyo
- Platforms: 4 side platforms
- Tracks: 5

Construction
- Structure type: At grade (Chuo Line); Elevated (Musashino Line)

Other information
- Status: Staffed ("Midori no Madoguchi")
- Website: Official website

History
- Opened: 1 April 1973; 53 years ago

Passengers
- FY2024: 55,728 (daily) ▲3.61%

Services
Preceding station	JR East	Following station
Kunitachi JC18 towards Ōtsuki	Chūō Line Rapid	Kokubunji JC16 towards Tokyo
Kita-Fuchū JM34 towards Fuchūhommachi	Musashino	Shin-Kodaira JM32 towards Ōmiya
Kita-Fuchū JM34 towards Fuchūhommachi	Musashino Line	Shin-Kodaira JM32 towards Kaihimmakuhari or Tokyo
Location
- Location within Special wards of Tokyo Location within Tokyo Bay and Bōsō Peninsula Location within Tokyo Location within Kanto Area Location within Japan

Nishi-Kokubunji Station (西国分寺駅, Nishi-Kokubunji-eki) is a junction passenger railway station located in the city of Kokubunji, Tokyo, Japan, operated by East Japan Railway Company (JR East).

== Lines ==
Nishi-Kokubunji Station is served by the Chūō Line (Rapid) from Tokyo to Hachiōji, and by the orbital Musashino Line from Fuchūhommachi to Nishi-Funabashi and Tokyo. It is 32.8 kilometers from the terminus of the Chūō Line at Tokyo Station and 3.9 kilometers from the starting point of the Musashino Line at Fuchūhommachi.

== Station layout ==
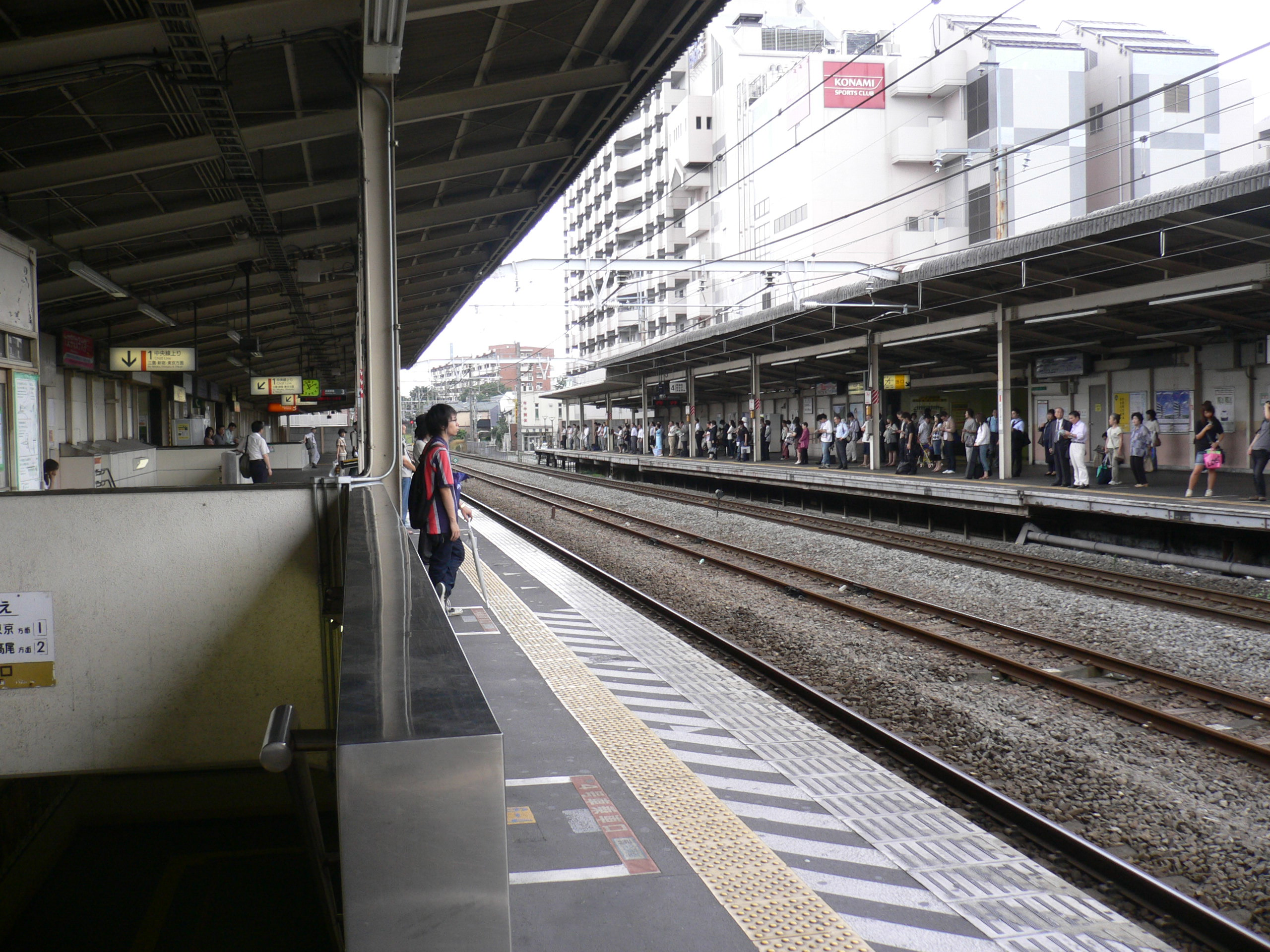
The Musashino Line platforms in July 2006

The station consists of two side platforms serving two tracks at ground level for the Chūō Line (Rapid), and two elevated side platforms at right angles to these serving two tracks for the Musashino Line. A third track lies between these two tracks for use by non-stop freight trains.

The station has a "Midori no Madoguchi" staffed ticket office.

=== Platforms ===
1	Chūō Line (Rapid)	for Nakano, Shinjuku, and Tokyo
2	Chūō Line (Rapid)	for Tachikawa and Hachiōji
3	Musashino Line	for Fuchūhommachi
4	Musashino Line	for Musashi-Urawa, Shim-Matsudo, Nishi-Funabashi, Tokyo, and Kaihimmakuhari

== History ==
The station opened on 1 April 1973. With the privatization of Japanese National Railways (JNR) on 1 April 1987, the station came under the control of JR East.

== Passenger statistics ==
In fiscal 2019, the station was used by an average of 29,577 passengers daily (boarding passengers only). The passenger figures for previous years are as shown below.

Fiscal year	Daily average
2000	19,674
2005	23,908
2010	26,969
2015	29,123

== Surrounding area ==
- Musashi Kokubunji Park
- Tokyo Metropolitan Neurological Hospital

== See also ==
- List of railway stations in Japan
