= Fuchūhommachi Station =

Railway station in Fuchū, Tokyo, Japan

JN20 JM35 Fuchūhommachi Station 府中本町駅
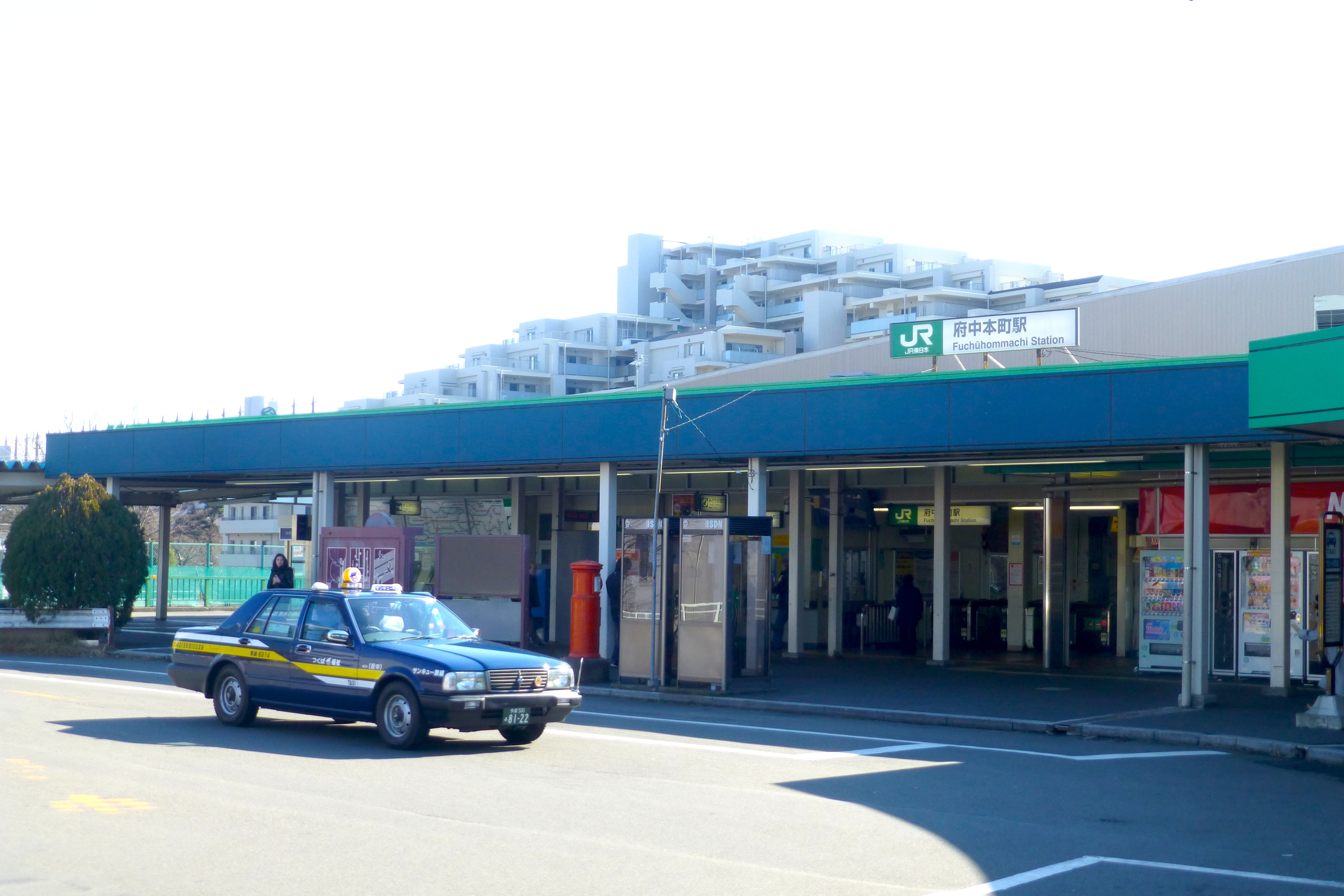
- Fuchūhommachi Station forecourt in January 2014

General information
- Location: 1-29 Hommachi, Fuchū City, Tokyo 183-0027; Japan
- Coordinates: 35°39′58″N 139°28′38″E
- Operator: JR East
- Lines: Nambu Line; Musashino Line
- Distance: 27.9 km (17.3 mi) from Kawasaki
- Platforms: 1 island + 2 side platforms
- Tracks: 6

Construction
- Structure type: At grade

Other information
- Status: Staffed ("Midori no Madoguchi")
- Station code: JN20; JM35
- Website: Official website

History
- Opened: 11 December 1928; 97 years ago

Passengers
- FY2019: 17,126 daily

Services
Preceding station	JR East	Following station
Bubaigawara JN21 towards Tachikawa	Nambu Line Rapid	Inagi-Naganuma JN18 towards Kawasaki
Bubaigawara JN21 towards Tachikawa	Nambu Line Local	Minami-Tama JN19 towards Kawasaki
Terminus	Musashino	Kita-Fuchū JM34 towards Ōmiya
Terminus	Musashino Line	Kita-Fuchū JM34 towards Kaihimmakuhari or Tokyo
Location
- Location within Tokyo Location within Kanto Area Location within Japan

Fuchūhommachi Station (府中本町駅, Fuchū-Honmachi-eki) is a junction passenger railway station located in the city of Fuchū, Tokyo, Japan, operated by East Japan Railway Company (JR East).

== Lines ==
Fuchūhommachi Station forms the western terminus of the orbital Musashino Line from Nishi-Funabashi and Tokyo, and is also served by the Nambu Line from Kawasaki to Tachikawa. It is located 22.8 kilometers from Tsurumi Station on the Musashino Line and 27.9 kilometers from Kawasaki Station on the Nambu Line.

== Station layout ==
Track diagram for Fuchūhommachi Station

The station consists of a central island platform serving two terminating tracks for the Musashino Line, with two side platforms on either side serving the Nambu Line tracks. Through tracks are used by freight trains continuing to and from Tsurumi on the freight-only Musashino South Line.

The station building is elevated and is located above the tracks and platforms. The station has a "Midori no Madoguchi" staffed ticket office.

=== Platforms ===
1	Nambu Line	for Noborito, Musashi-Kosugi, and Kawasaki
2	Musashino Line	Alighting passengers only
3	Musashino Line	for Nishi-Kokubunji, Shim-Matsudo, and Nishi-Funabashi
4	Nambu Line	for Bubaigawara and Tachikawa

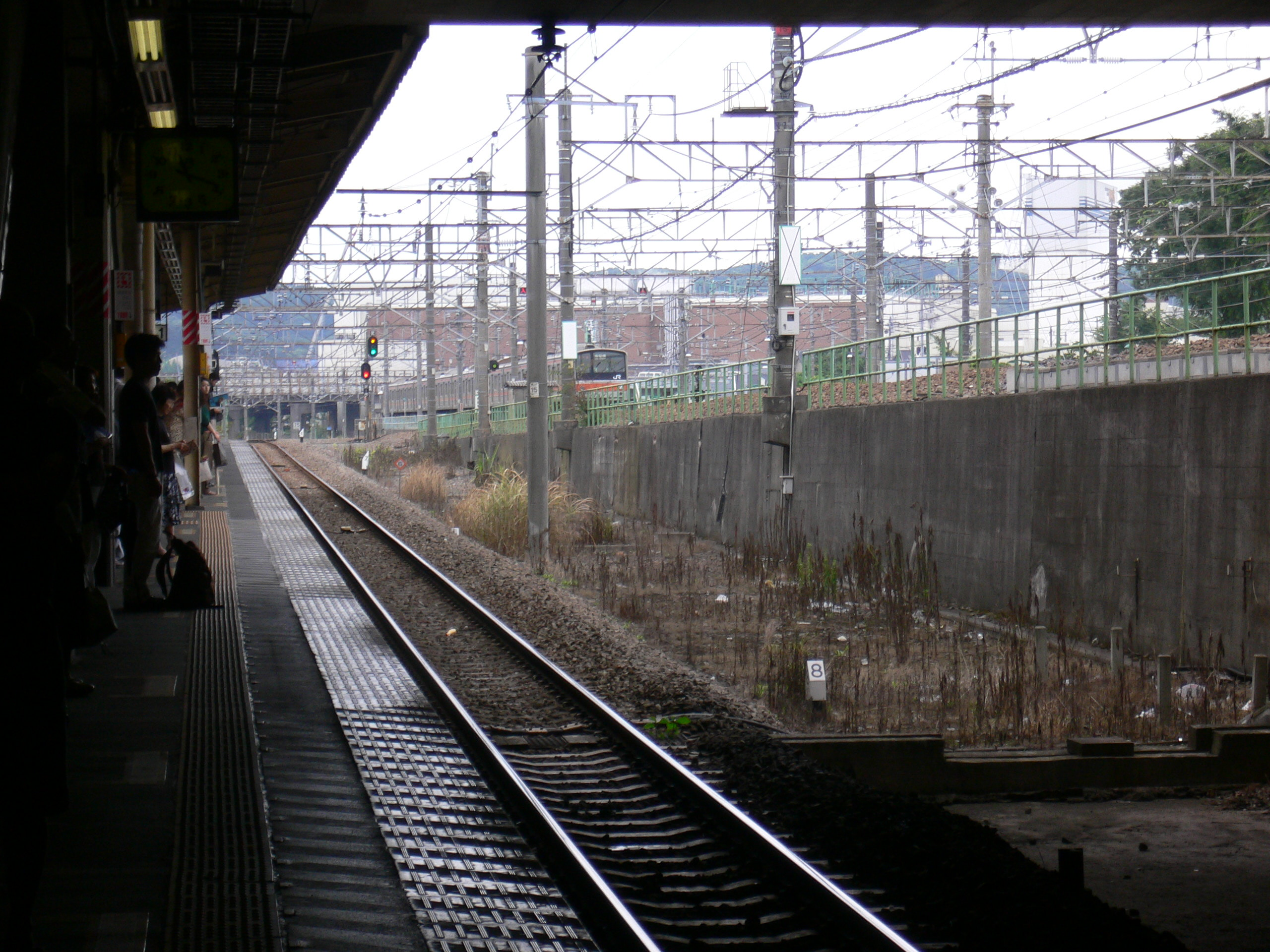
View from Nambu Line platform 1 with the Musashino Line stabling sidings visible above, July 2006

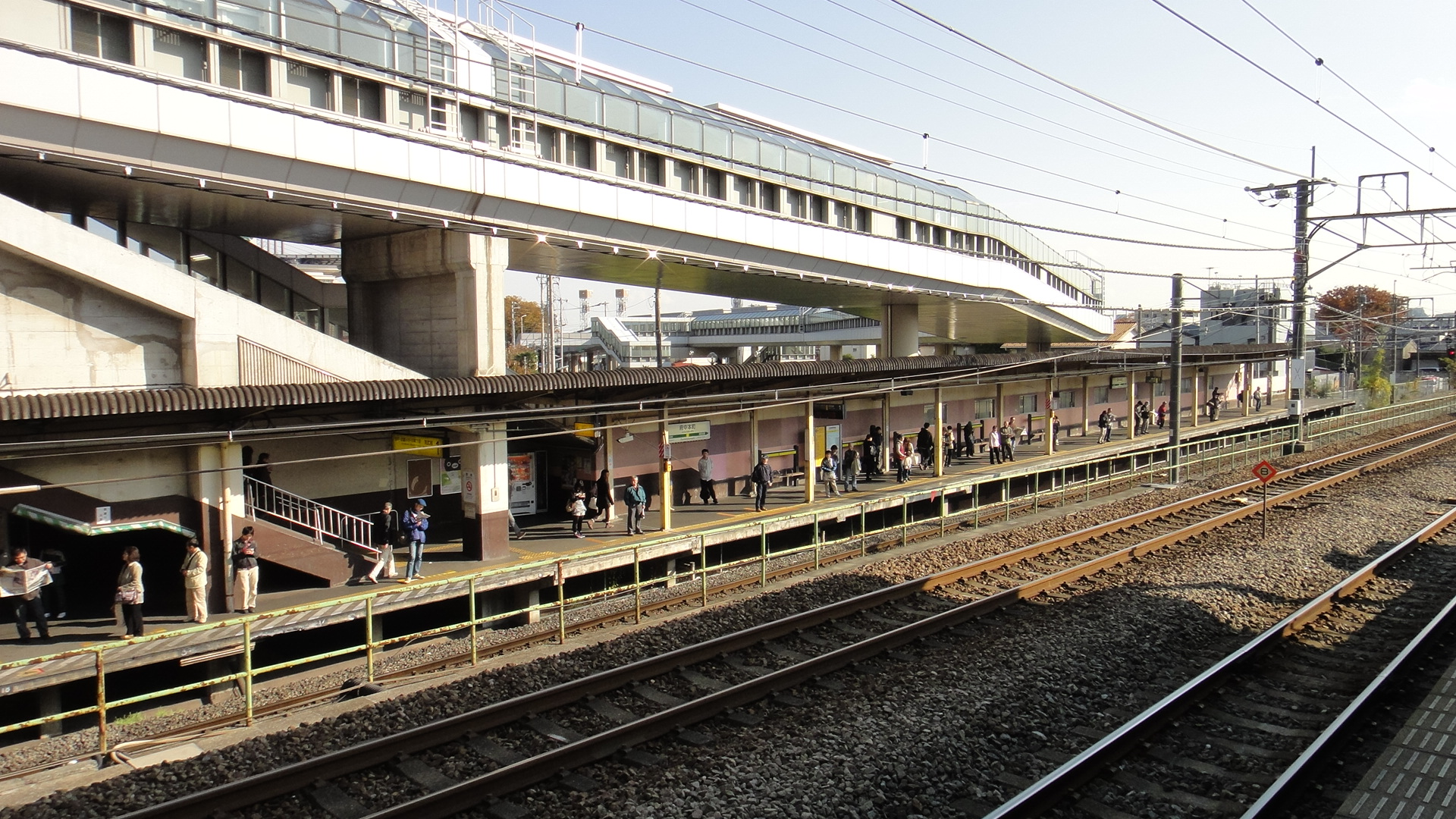
View of the southbound Nambu Line platform 1 from the Musashino Line platforms, November 2012

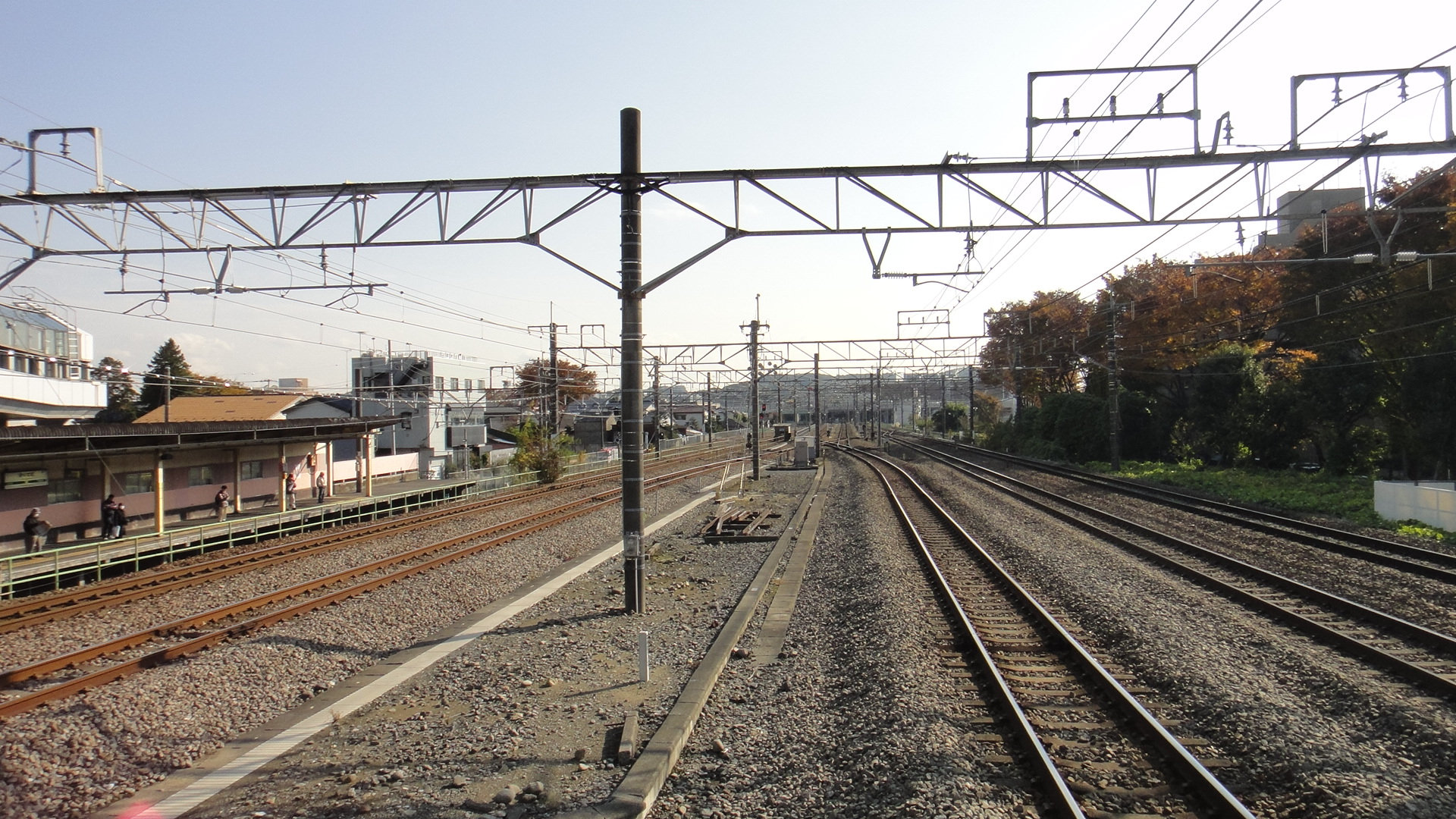
View looking south from the Musashino Line platforms, November 2012

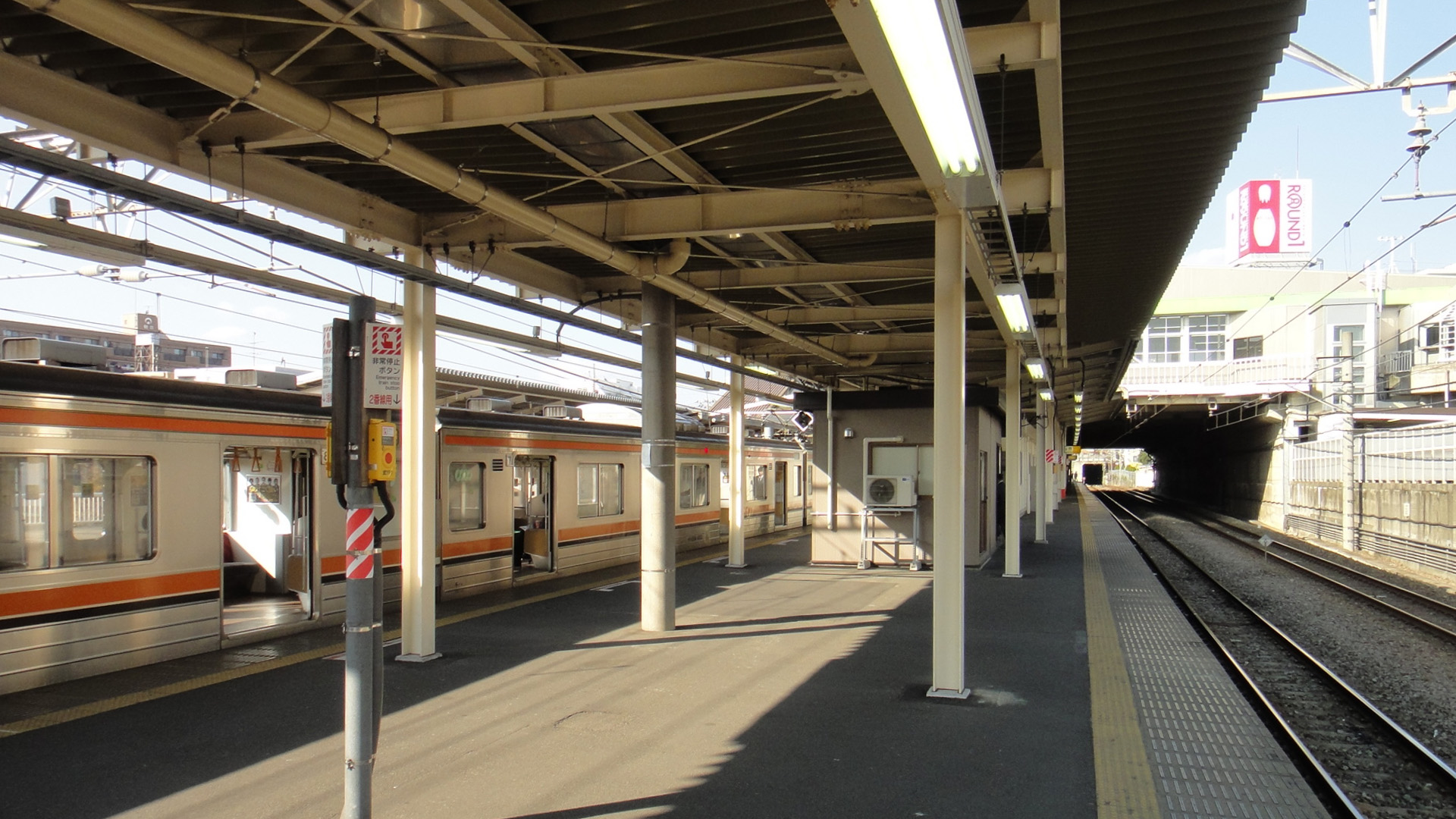
Musashino Line platforms 2 (right) and 3 (left), November 2012

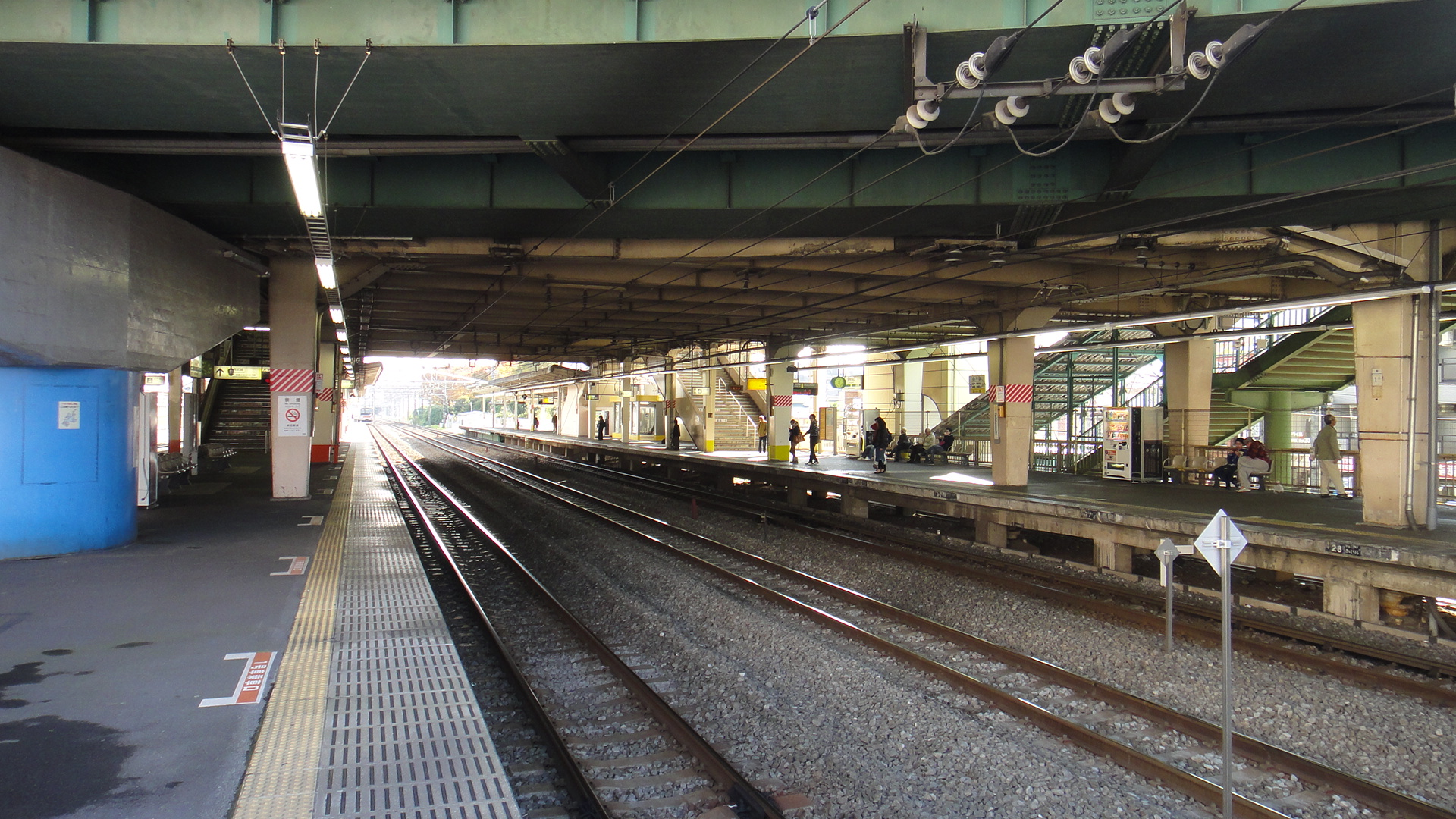
View of the northbound Nambu Line platform 4 from the Musashino Line platforms, November 2012

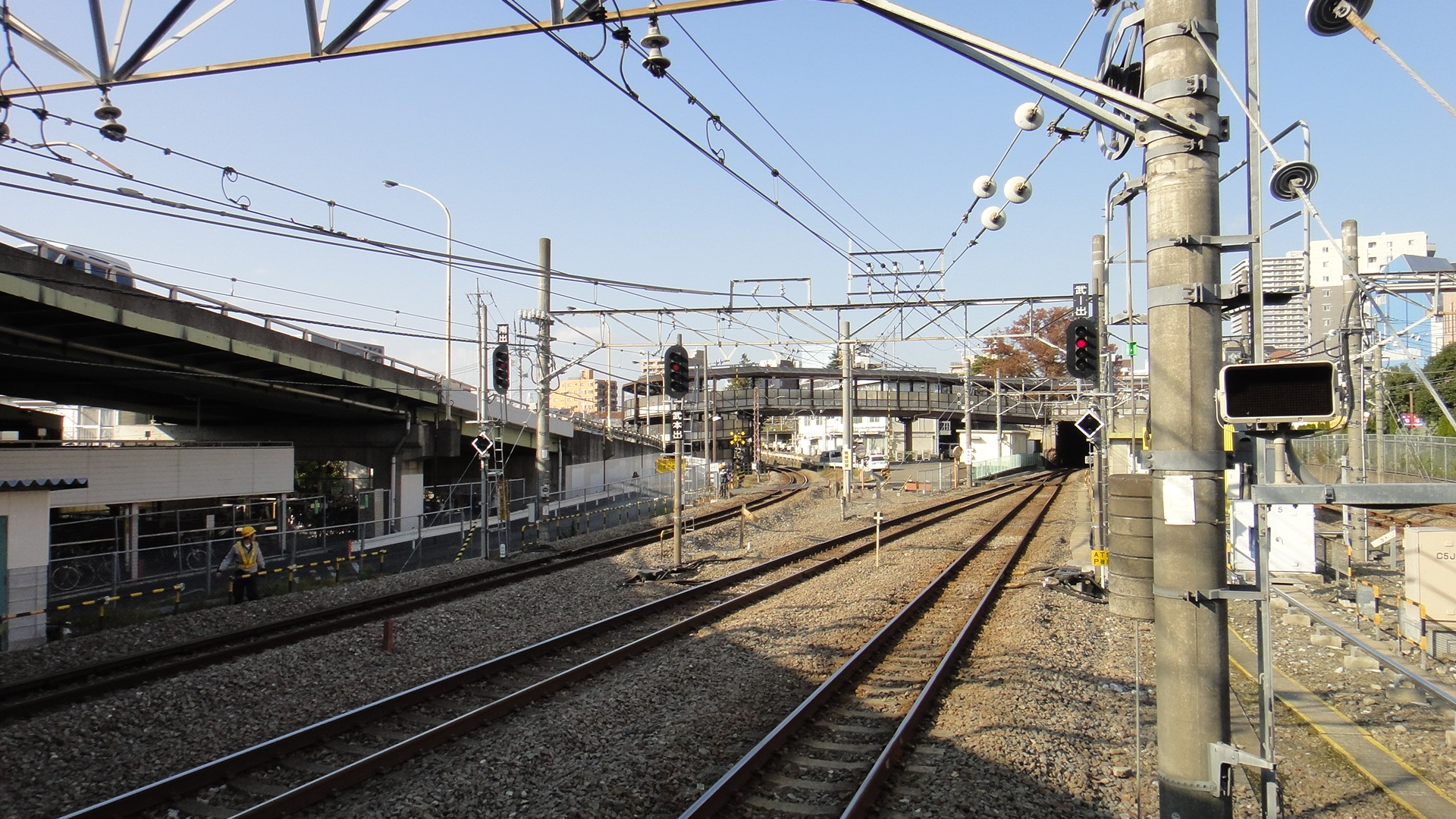
View looking north from the Musashino Line platforms, November 2012

== History ==
The station opened on 11 December 1928. The Musashino Line platforms opened on 1 April 1973. With the privatization of Japanese National Railways (JNR) on 1 April 1987, the station came under the control of JR East.

== Passenger statistics ==
In fiscal 2019, the station was used by an average 17,126 passengers daily (boarding passengers only). The passenger figures (boarding passengers only) for previous years are as shown below.

Fiscal year	Daily average
2000	17,300
2005	16,965
2010	16,686
2015	17,209

== Surrounding area ==
- Fuchū Station (Keio Line)
- Fuchū-Keiba-Seimon-mae Station (Keiō Keibajō Line)
- Bubaigawara Station (Nambu Line)
- Tokyo Racecourse (direct access from station via special gates on race days)
- Tamagawa Kyōtei Course (boat racing)
- Fuchū City Office
- Ōkunitama Shrine
- Anyoji Temple
- Kyodo no mori museum
- Tama River

== See also ==
- List of railway stations in Japan
