= Nishi-Urawa Station =

Railway station in Saitama, Japan

JM27 Nishi-Urawa Station 西浦和駅
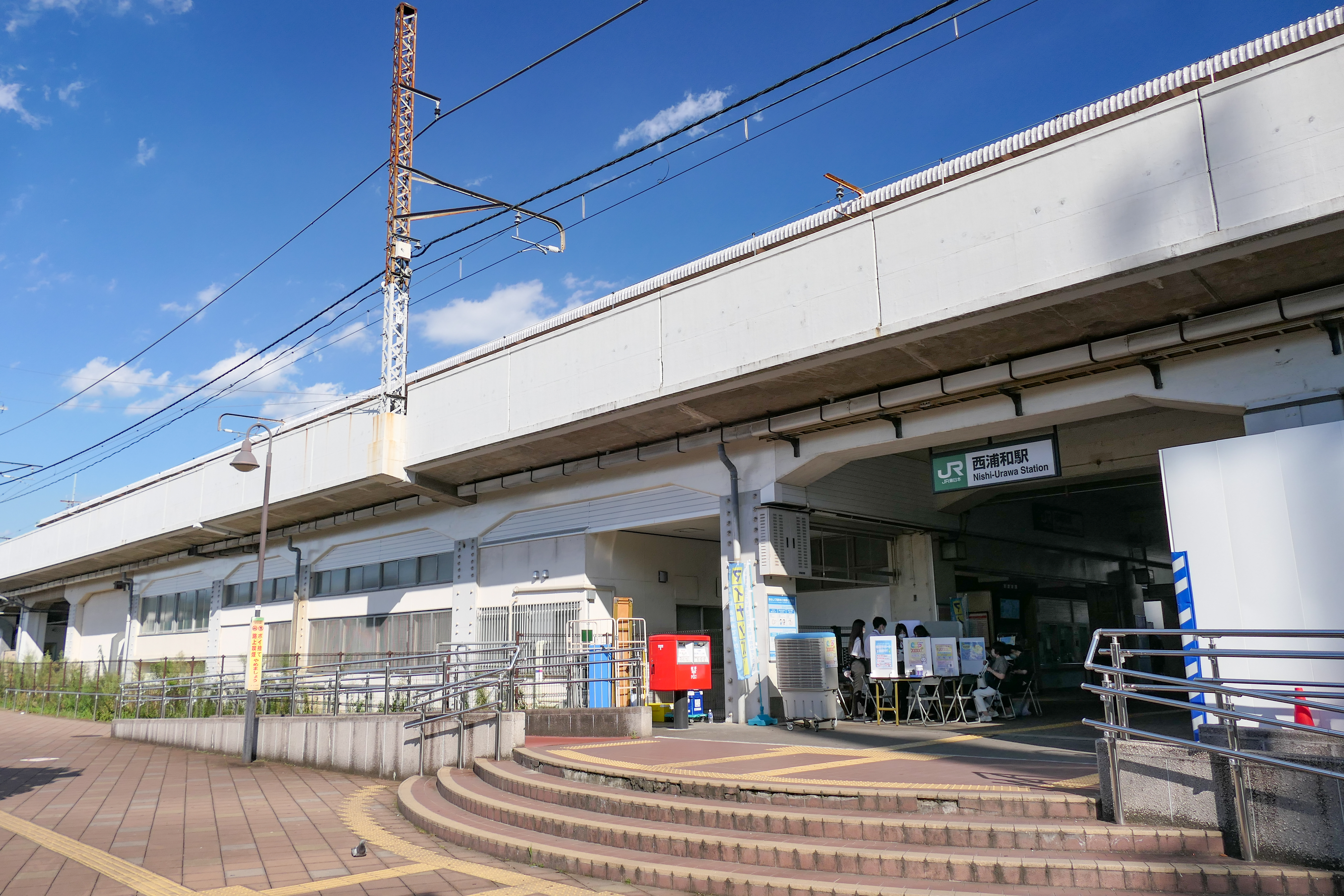
- Nishi-Urawa Station, August 2022

General information
- Location: 5-10-20 Tajima, Sakura-ku, Saitama-shi, Saitama-ken 338-0837; Japan
- Coordinates: 35.8439°N 139.6280°E
- Operator: JR East
- Line: Musashino Line
- Distance: 27.8 km from Fuchūhommachi
- Platforms: 1 island platform
- Connections: Bus stop

Other information
- Status: Staffed
- Website: Official website

History
- Opened: 1 April 1973

Passengers
- FY2019: 14,758

Services
Preceding station	JR East	Following station
Kita-Asaka JM28 towards Fuchūhommachi	Musashino Line	Musashi-Urawa JM26 towards Kaihimmakuhari or Tokyo
Location
- Location within Saitama city Location within Saitama Prefecture Location within Japan

Nishi-Urawa Station (西浦和駅, Nishi-Urawa-eki) is a passenger railway station on the Musashino Line located in Sakura-ku, Saitama, Japan, operated by the East Japan Railway Company (JR East).

== Lines ==
Nishi-Urawa Station is served by the Musashino Line from Fuchūhommachi to Nishi-Funabashi and Tokyo. It is located 27.8 kilometers from Fuchūhommachi Station.

== Station layout ==
The station consists of an elevated island platform serving two tracks (2 and 3), with the station building located underneath. Additional tracks (1 and 4) outside the platforms tracks are used by freight trains and Musashino services to and from the Tōhoku Main Line. The station is staffed.

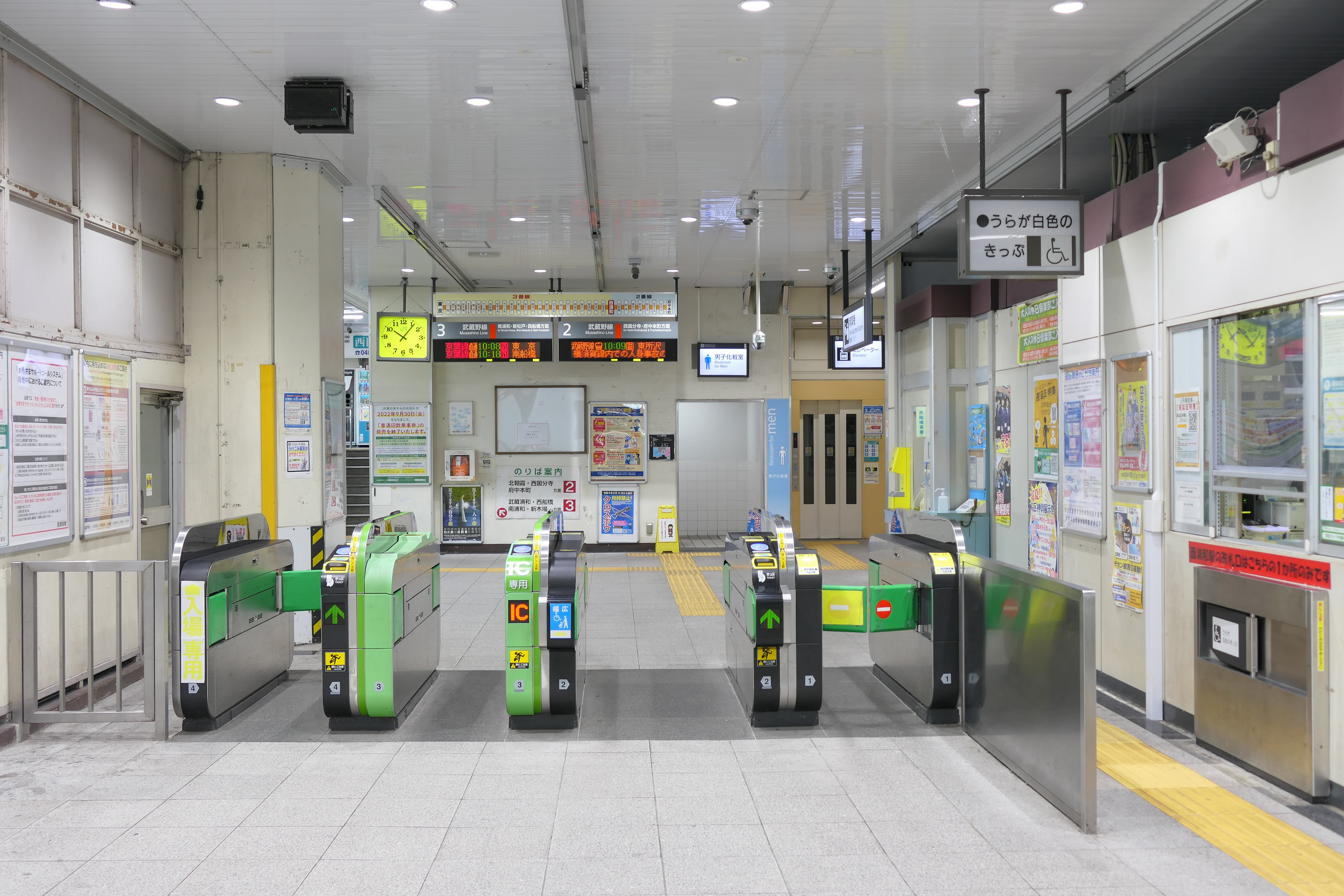
Ticket gate, August 2022

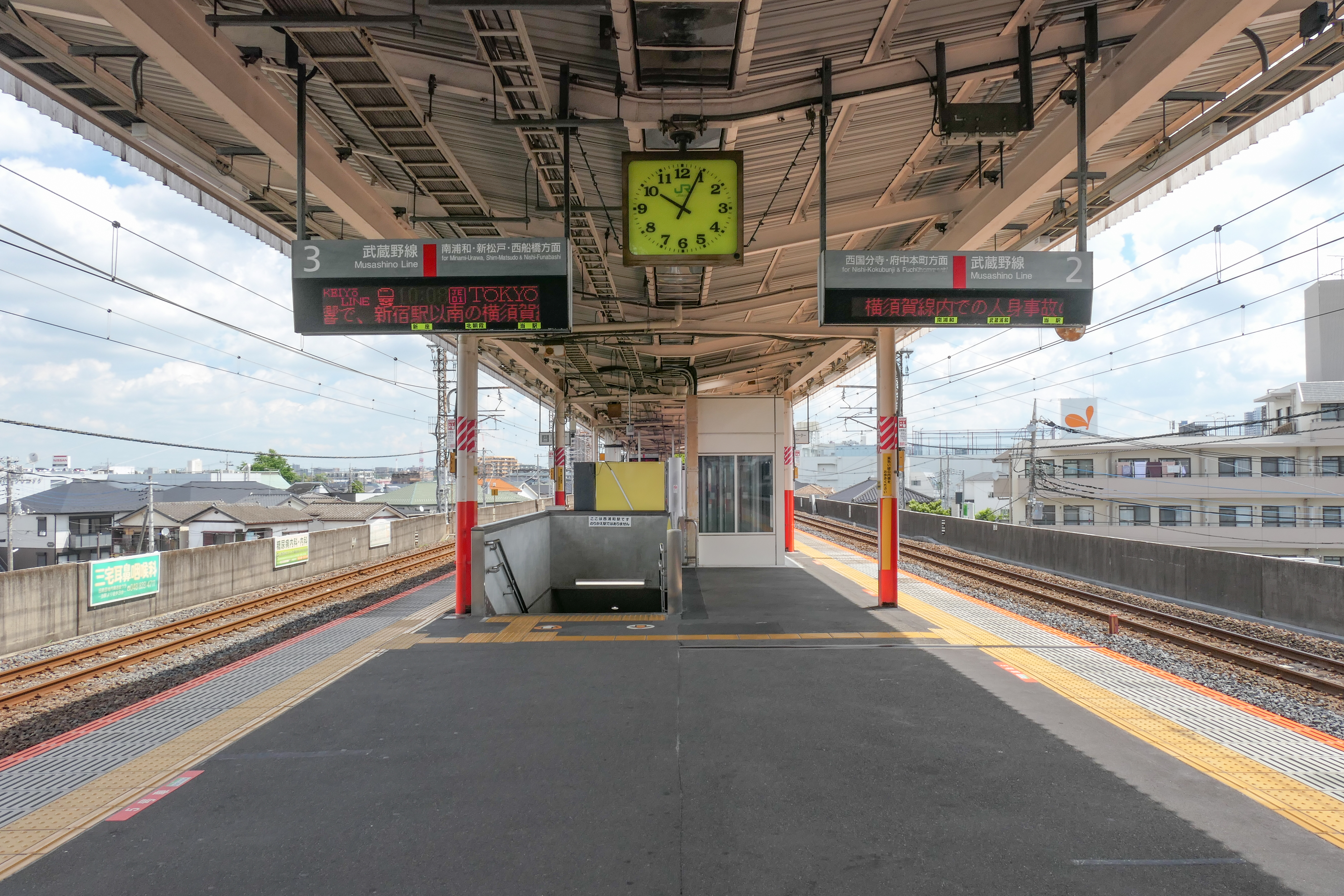
Station platforms, August 2022

=== Platforms ===
2	Musashino Line	for Kita-Asaka, Nishi-Kokubunji and Fuchūhommachi
3	Musashino Line	for Musashi-Urawa, Shim-Matsudo, Nishi-Funabashi, Tokyo, and Kaihimmakuhari

== History ==
The station opened on 1 April 1973.

== Passenger statistics ==
In fiscal 2019, the station was used by an average of 14,758 passengers daily (boarding passengers only).

== Surrounding area ==
- National Route 17
- Akigase Park

== See also ==
- List of railway stations in Japan
