= Musashino (train) =

Train service operated in Japan by JR East

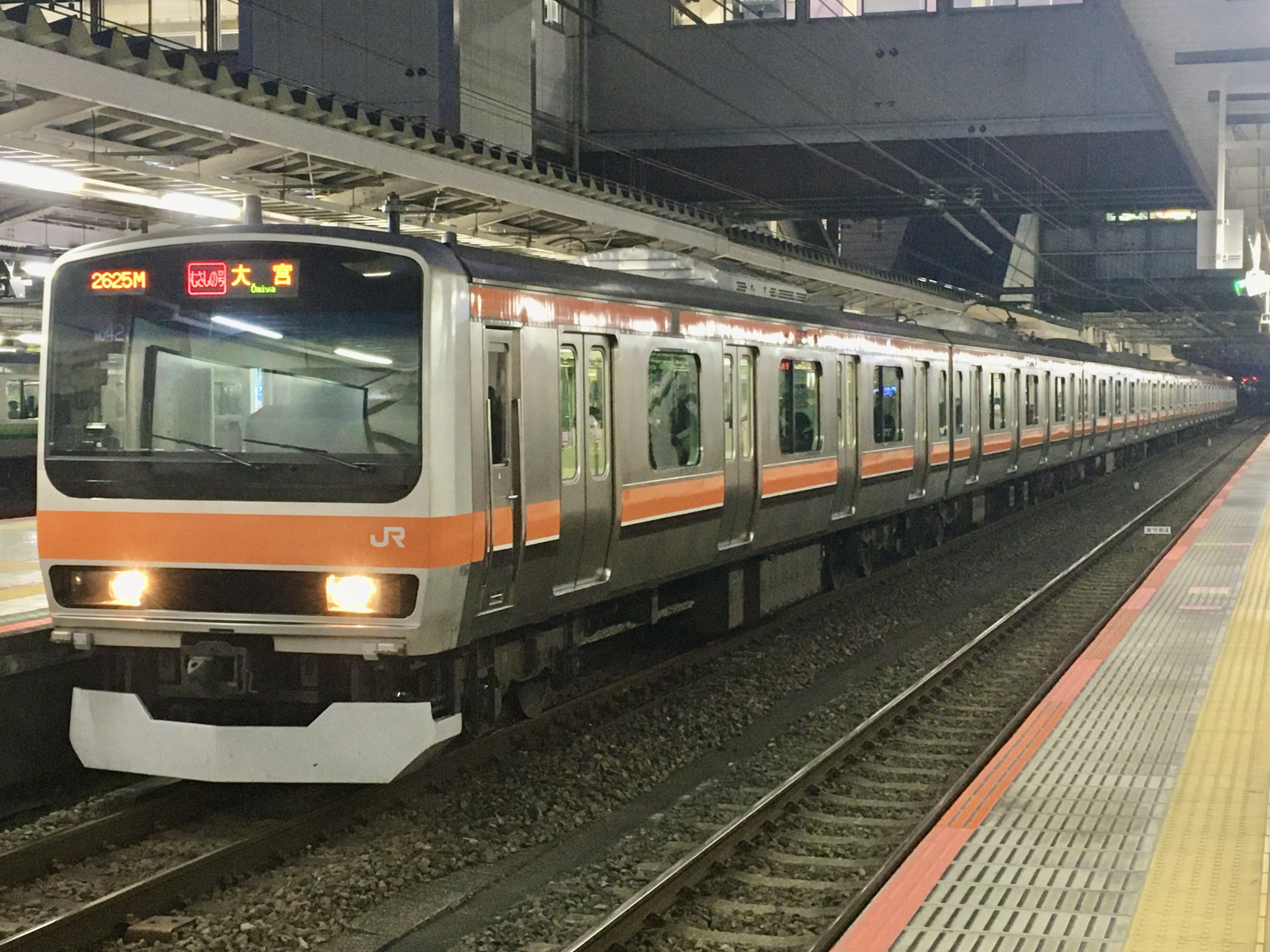
- JR East E231-0 series EMU set MU42 on a Musashino service, December 2020

Overview
- Service type: Local
- Locale: Tokyo and Saitama Prefecture, Japan
- Predecessor: Rapid Shinkansen Relay
- First service: 2001 (Rapid); 4 December 2010 (Local)
- Current operator: JR East

Route
- Termini: Hachiōji/Fuchū-Hommachi; Ōmiya
- Lines used: Tōhoku Main Line, Musashino Line, Chūō Main Line

On-board services
- Class: Standard class only
- Seating arrangements: Longitudinal
- Catering facilities: None
- Other facilities: No toilets

Technical
- Rolling stock: 209-500/E231-0/E231-900 series EMUs
- Track gauge: 1,067 mm (3 ft 6 in)
- Electrification: 1,500 V DC overhead

The Musashino (むさしの) is an all-stations train service in Japan operated by the East Japan Railway Company (JR East) in Tokyo between Hachiōji on the Chuo Line or Fuchū-Hommachi on the Musashino Line and Ōmiya in Saitama Prefecture. It avoids passengers having to change trains at Minami-Urawa or Musashi-Urawa to access the western portion of the Musashino line to/from Ōmiya. This train only operates a few services in the morning and evening peaks each day. Shimōsa is a similar service linking Ōmiya and the eastern side of the Musashino Line. The trains terminate at Fuchū-Hommachi, Ōmiya and Hachiōji. The trains from Hachiōji travel on the Chuo Line. After Kunitachi station, trains will go through a cargo branch. After stopping at Shin-Kodaira, the train uses the Musashino Line. After Kita-Asaka station, the train goes by special freight non-stop tracks. After passing Nishi-Urawa station, the train turns to Ōmiya arriving tracks. Trains usually stop on Platforms 3 and 4 at Ōmiya station.

== Service pattern ==
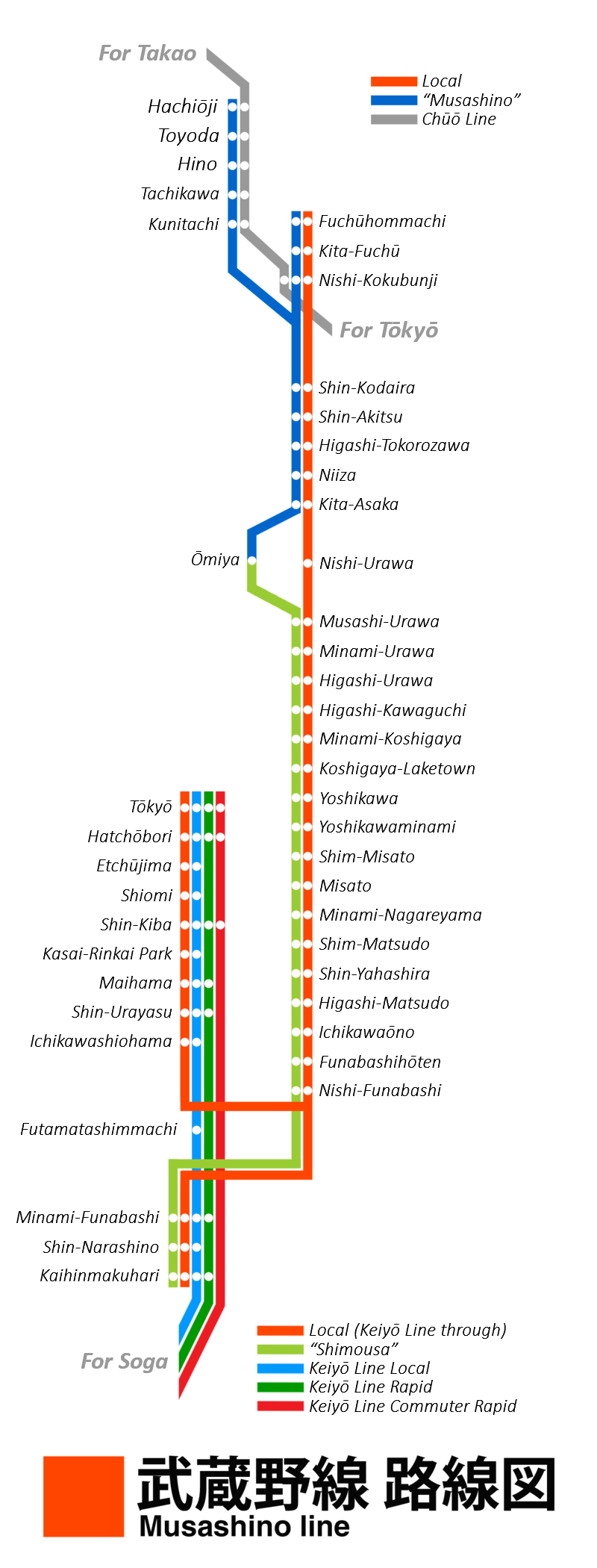
Musashino Line service diagram, including Shimousa and Musashino services

Services consist of two trains from Fuchū-Hommachi to Ōmiya in the morning, together with one return working from Ōmiya to Hachiōji and back. In the evening, there are two services from Ōmiya to Hachiōji, and one service from Hachiōji to Ōmiya.

=== Weekdays ===
==== To Ōmiya ====
- Fuchūhommachi (07:35) → Ōmiya (08:15)
- Fuchūhommachi (08:07) → Ōmiya (0844)
- Hachiōji (16:55) → Ōmiya (17:45)
- Hachiōji (18:44) → Ōmiya (19:43)

==== To Hachiōji ====
- Ōmiya (08:49) → Hachiōji (09:44)
- Ōmiya (18:47) → Hachiōji (19:47)
- Ōmiya (20:31) → Hachiōji (21:25)

=== Weekends/holidays ===
==== To Ōmiya ====
- Hachiōji (07:19) → Ōmiya (08:12)
- Fuchūhommachi (08:26) → Ōmiya (09:04)
- Hachiōji (09:50) → Ōmiya (10:40)
- Hachiōji (16:56) → Ōmiya (17:45)
- Hachiōji (17:47) → Ōmiya (18:36)

==== To Hachiōji ====
- Ōmiya (08:53) → Hachiōji (09:45)
- Ōmiya (18:22) → Hachiōji (19:16)
- Ōmiya (19:52) → Hachiōji (20:43)

== Routes ==
The trains to and from Hachiōji use two of the Musashino Line freight branches: one connects the Chūō Main Line (Kunitachi Station) and the Musashino Line (Shin-Kodaira Station) and the other connects the Musashino Line (Nishi-Urawa Station) and the Tōhoku Main Line (Yono Station).

== Rolling stock ==
Current rolling stock:

Services share rolling stock with the Musashino Line and are currently operated by 209-500 series, E231-0 series, or E231-900 series 8-car EMUs with longitudinal seating throughout.

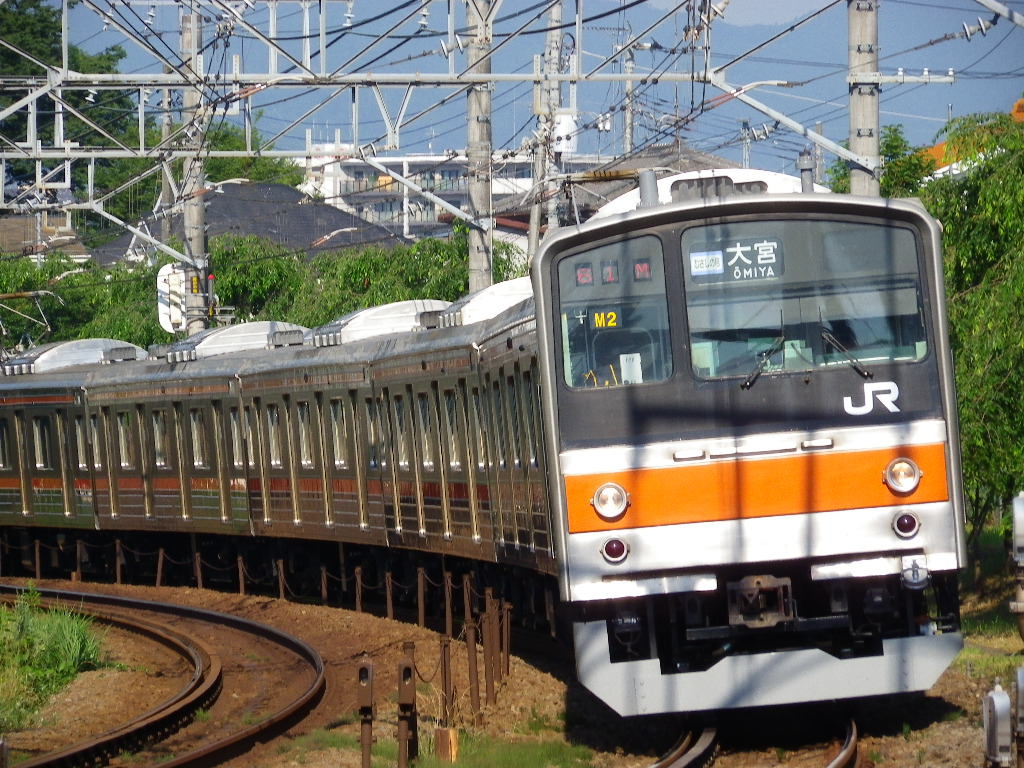
A 205 series EMU on a Musashino rapid service, July 2011

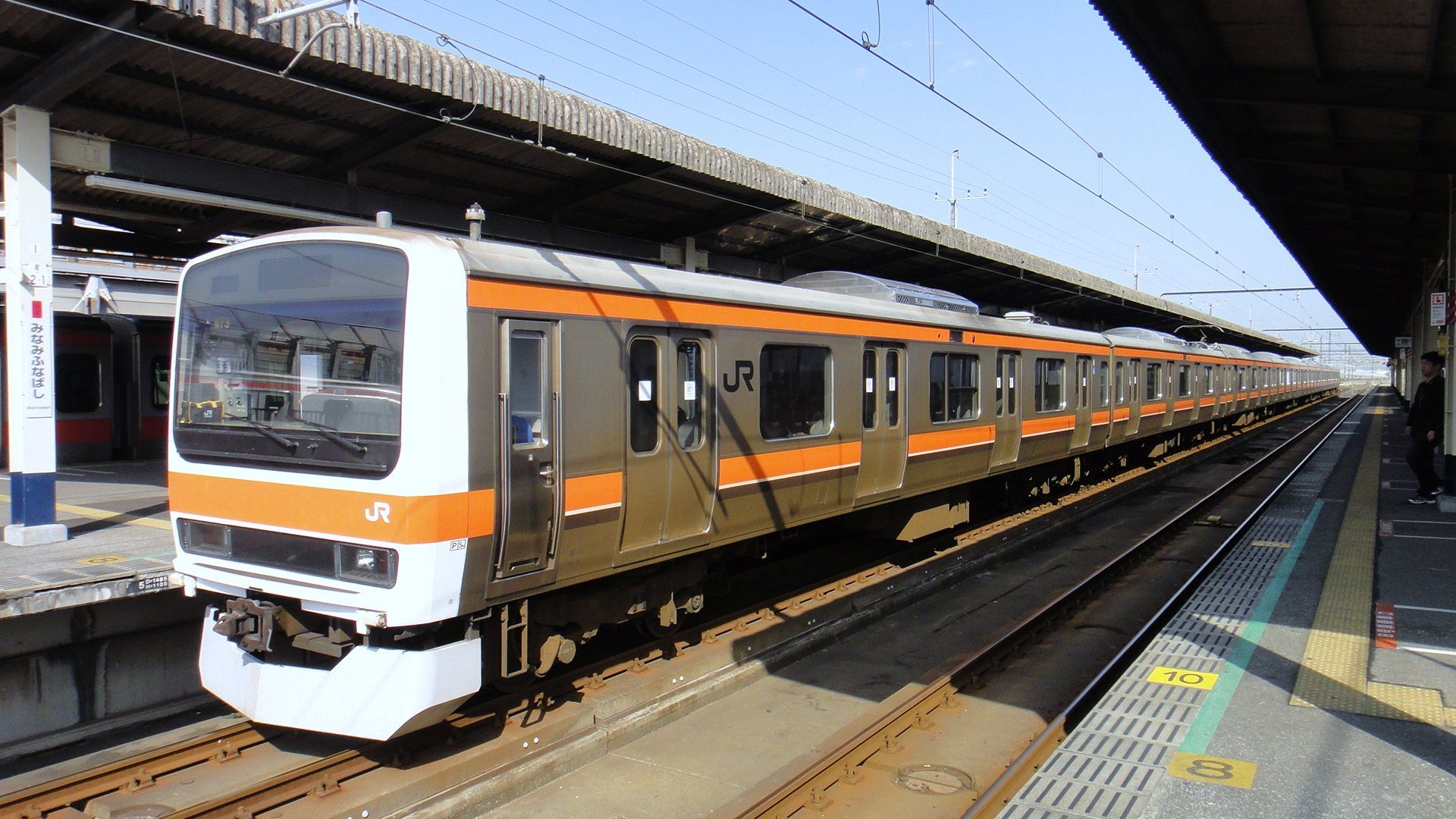
Musashino Line 209–500 series

Former rolling stock:

Former rolling stock was 8-car 205 series, 6-car 115 series and 6-car 169 series

== History ==
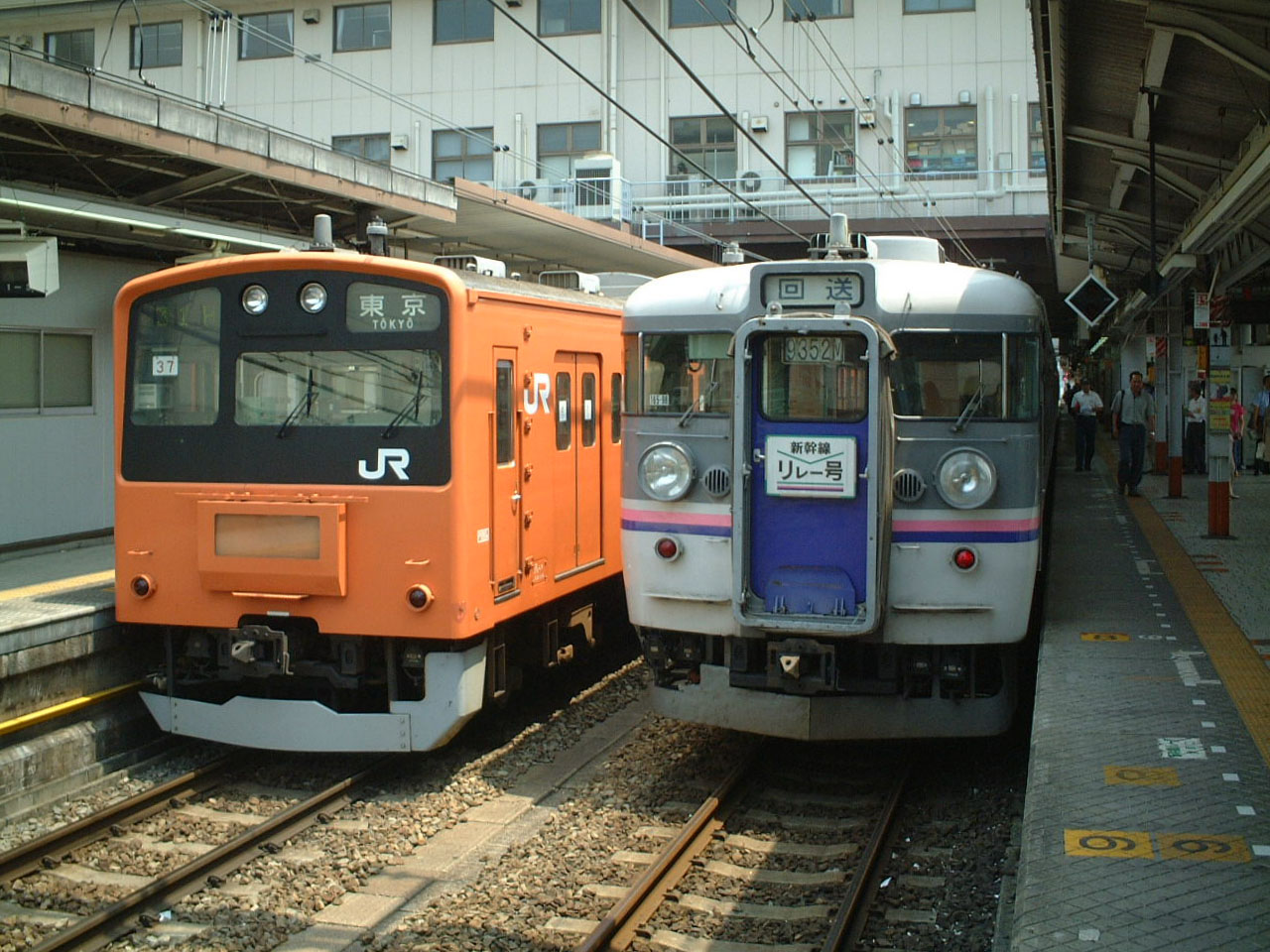
165 series on a Shinkansen Relay rapid service at Hachiōji Station, August 2001

The Musashino was formed in 2001 following the renaming of the earlier Rapid Shinkansen Relay. From 1 December 2002, 6-car 115 series EMU formations based at Toyoda depot in Tokyo replaced the previous 165 and 169 series EMU formations.

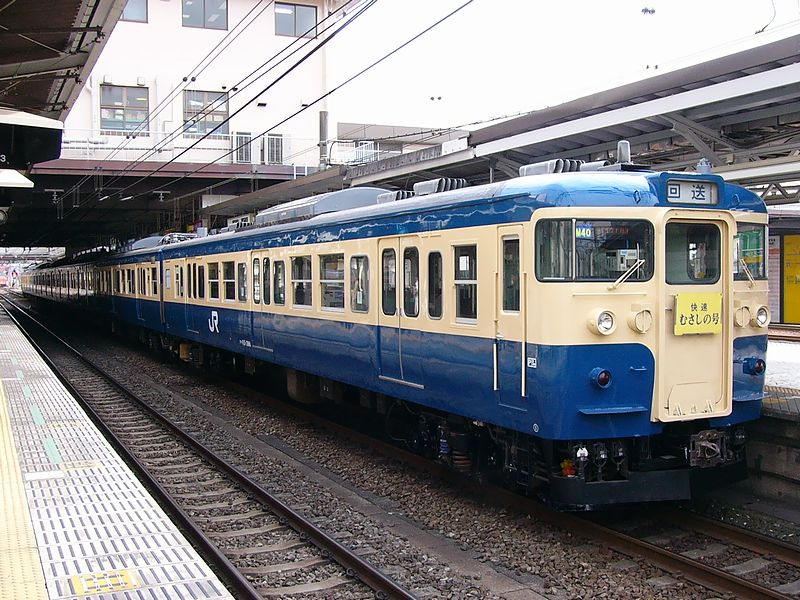
115 series 6-car EMU on a Musashino rapid service, March 2004

=== Rapid service pattern ===
Prior to the 4 December 2010 timetable revision, two return workings operated on weekdays, with one return Holiday Rapid Musashino working at weekends, as shown below.

==== Weekdays ====
- Musashino 1: Fuchū-Hommachi (07:35) → Ōmiya (08:15)
- Musashino 2: Ōmiya (08:49) → Hachiōji (09:44)
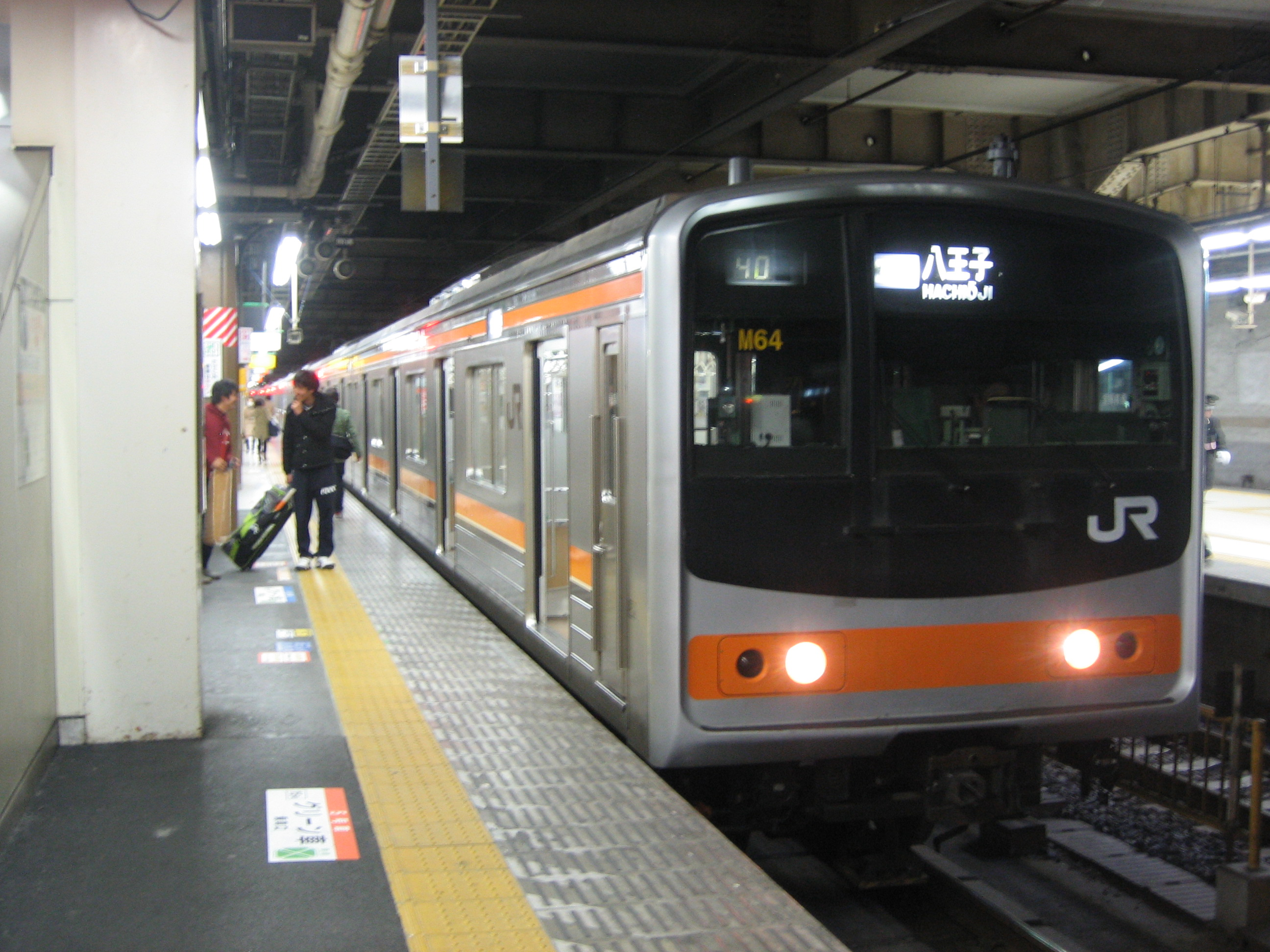
- 205 series Musashino train service to Hachioji
  Musashino 3: Hachiōji (16:55) → Ōmiya (17:45)
- Musashino 4: Ōmiya (18:47) → Hachiōji (19:47)

==== Weekends/holidays ====
- Musashino: Hachiōji (07.19) → Ōmiya (08.12)
- Musashino: Hachiōji (09.53) → Ōmiya (10.40)
- Musashino: Hachiōji (16.56) → Ōmiya (17.45)
- Musashino: Hachiōji (17.47) → Ōmiya (18.36)
- Musashino: Ōmiya (08.53) → Hachiōji (09.45)
- Musashino: Ōmiya (18.22) → Hachiōji (19.16)
- Musashino: Ōmiya (19.52) → Hachiōji (20.43)

From the start of the revised timetable on 4 December 2010, the Musashino ceased to be a limited-stop "rapid" service, with trains stopping at all stations, and the number of daily services increased.

== See also ==
- List of named passenger trains of Japan
- Musashino Line
- Shimōsa (train), a similar service linking Ōmiya and the eastern side of the Musashino Line and also the Keiyō Line.
