= Sakura-ku =

Sakura-ku, Saitama 桜区
- Ward
- Sakura Ward
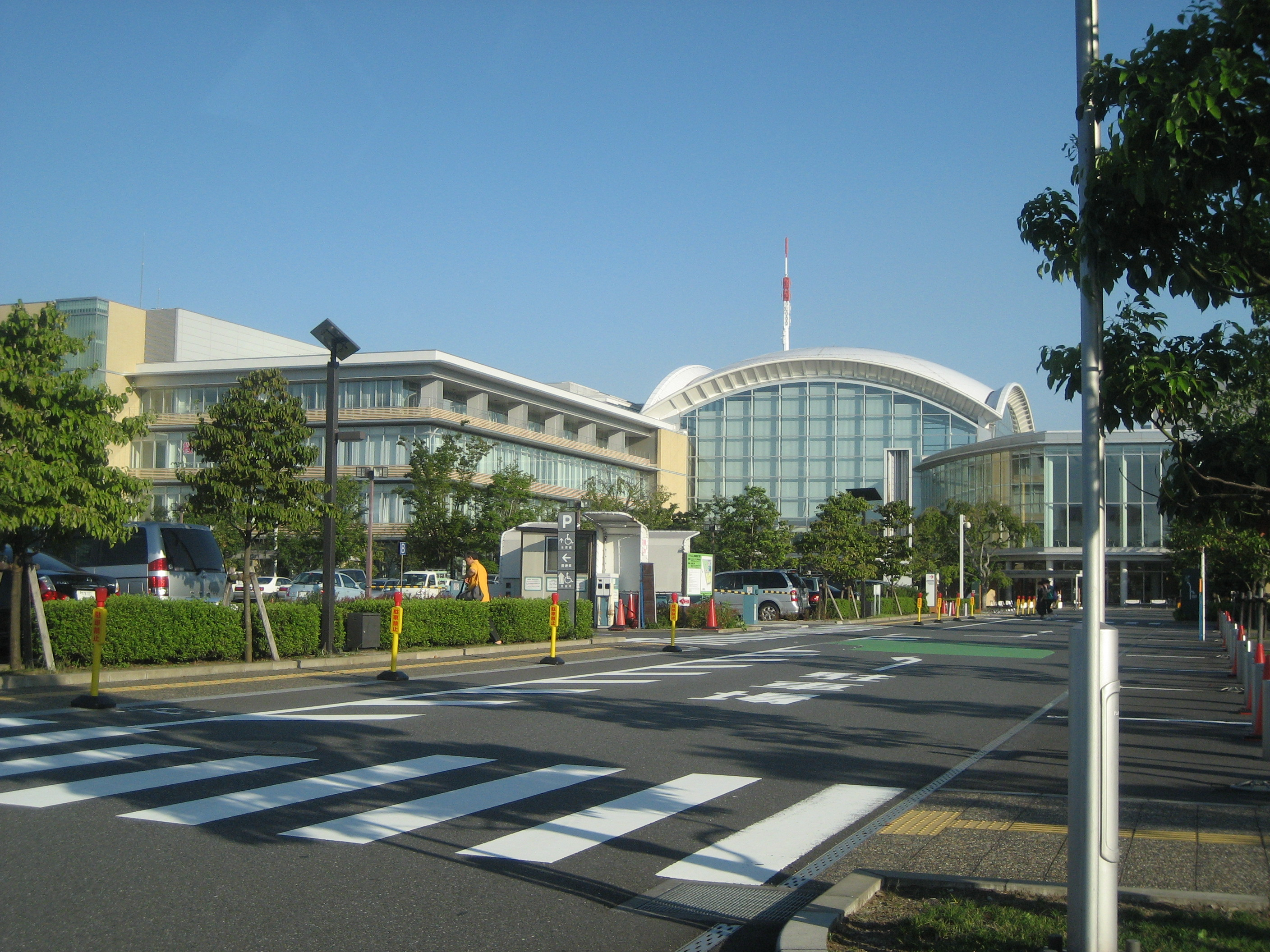
- Sakura Ward Office, Saitama City

- Seal

- Location of Sakura-ku in Saitama

- Coordinates: 35°51′20.8″N 139°36′35.6″E
- Country: Japan
- Region: Kantō
- Prefecture: Saitama
- City: Saitama

Area
  - Total: 18.64 km^{2} (7.20 sq mi)

Population (March 2021)
  - Total: 95,829
  - Density: 5,141/km^{2} (13,320/sq mi)
- Time zone: UTC+9 (Japan Standard Time)
- Tree: Sakura
- -Flower: Primula sieboldii
- Phone number: 048-835-3156
- Address: 4-3-1 Dōjō, Sakura-ku, Saitama-shi, Saitama-ken 338-8586
- Website: Official website

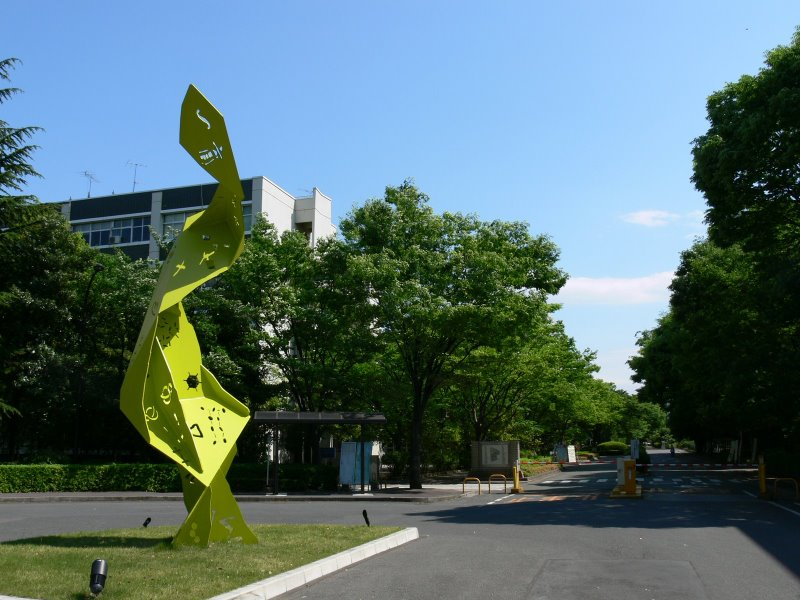
Saitama University

Sakura-ku (桜区, Sakura-ku) is one of ten wards of the city of Saitama, in Saitama Prefecture, Japan, and is located in the southwestern part of the city.

== Population ==
As of 1 March 2021, the ward had an estimated population of 95,829 and a population density of 5,100 persons per km^{2}. Its total area was 18.64 square kilometres (7.20 sq mi).

== Geography ==
Sakura Ward is located in the far southwestern corner of Saitama City on the floodplain of the Arakawa River and the Kamo River.

=== Neighboring Municipalities ===
Saitama Prefecture

- Nishi-ku
- Ōmiya-ku
- Chūō-ku
- Minami-ku
- Asaka
- Shiki
- Fujimi

== History ==
The area of modern Sakura Ward has been inhabited since prehistoric times, and there are many kofun burial mounds in the area. The villages of Okubo and Tsuchiai and Miyamoto were created within Kitaadachi District, Saitama with the establishment of the municipalities system on April 1, 1889. On January 1, 1955, these villages were annexed by Urawa City. On May 1, 2001, the cities of Urawa, Yono and Ōmiya merged to form the new city of Saitama. When Saitama was proclaimed a designated city in 2003, the area corresponding to former Okubo and most of former became Sakura Ward. The name of Sakura-ku means "Cherry-ward" literally, though it refers to Sakura-sō (Japanese primrose), as this area has been well known for wild primrose flowers.

== Education ==
- Saitama University
- Sakura-ku has eight elementary schools, four junior high schools, and three high schools and one special education school.

Public junior high schools:

- Kami Okubo (上大久保中学校)
- Okubo (大久保中学校)
- Tajima (田島中学校)
- Tsuchiai (土合中学校)

Municipal elementary schools:

- Jinde (神田小学校)
- Nakajima (中島小学校)
- Okubo (大久保小学校)
- Okubo Higashi (大久保東小学校)
- Sakawa (栄和小学校)
- Shibiraki (新開小学校)
- Tajima (田島小学校)
- Tsuchiai (土合小学校)

== Transportation ==
=== Railway ===
JR East – Musashino Line

- Nishi-Urawa

=== Highway ===
- Shuto Expressway Ōmiya Route
- National Route 17
- National Route 463

== Local attractions ==
- Akigase Park
