= Shinkansen Relay =

Japanese National Railways train service (1982–1985)

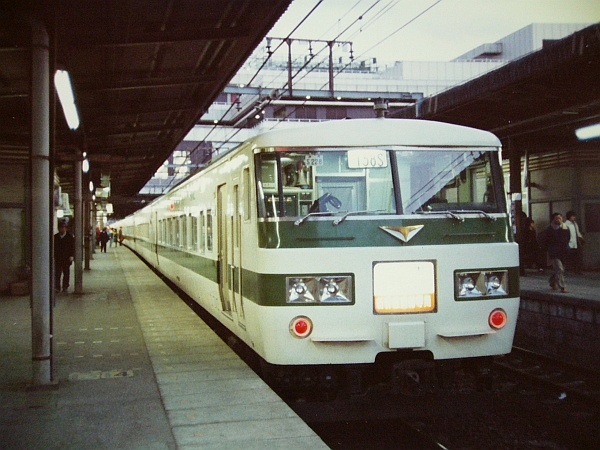
- 185-200 series set on a Shinkansen Relay service at Ōmiya Station, 1982

Overview
- Service type: Express
- Status: Discontinued
- First service: 23 June 1982
- Last service: 13 March 1985
- Former operator: Japanese National Railways

Route
- Termini: Ueno; Ōmiya
- Stops: Non-stop
- Distance travelled: 26.7 km (16.6 mi)
- Average journey time: 26 minutes
- Service frequency: Every 30 minutes
- Line used: Tōhoku Main Line

Technical
- Rolling stock: 185-200 series
- Track gauge: 1,067 mm (3 ft 6 in)
- Electrification: Overhead line, 1,500 V DC

The Shinkansen Relay (Japanese: 新幹線リレー号) was a temporary passenger train service operated by Japanese National Railways (JNR) between 1982 and 1985 to bridge the incomplete southern section of the Tōhoku Shinkansen between Ōmiya Station in Saitama Prefecture and Ueno Station in Tokyo. When the Tōhoku Shinkansen opened on 23 June 1982, the planned southern section between Ōmiya Station and central Tokyo was not yet complete, following earlier legal challenges and community opposition along the corridor that led Japanese National Railways (JNR) to suspend construction between Tokyo and Ōmiya while negotiations continued.

To maintain connectivity with Tokyo, the Shinkansen Relay operated non-stop between Ōmiya and Ueno over the narrow-gauge Tōhoku Main Line.

At the start of operations, the service ran 13 southbound and 14 northbound trains daily, completing the journey in approximately 26 minutes. From November 1982, frequencies were increased to nearly half-hourly daytime service, reflecting growing passenger demand. Trains were typically formed of paired 7-car 185-200 series electric multiple units (EMUs), with each Relay service timed to connect with corresponding Tōhoku and Jōetsu Shinkansen services. Other rolling stock, including 455 series express and 115 series suburban EMUs, was used on a limited basis.

The Shinkansen Relay was discontinued on 13 March 1985, one day before the opening of the Shinkansen extension between Ōmiya and Ueno, which eliminated the need for transfer services. Following the service’s withdrawal, the 185-200 series trainsets were reassigned to other limited express duties.

== Rapid Shinkansen Relay (1998–2001) ==
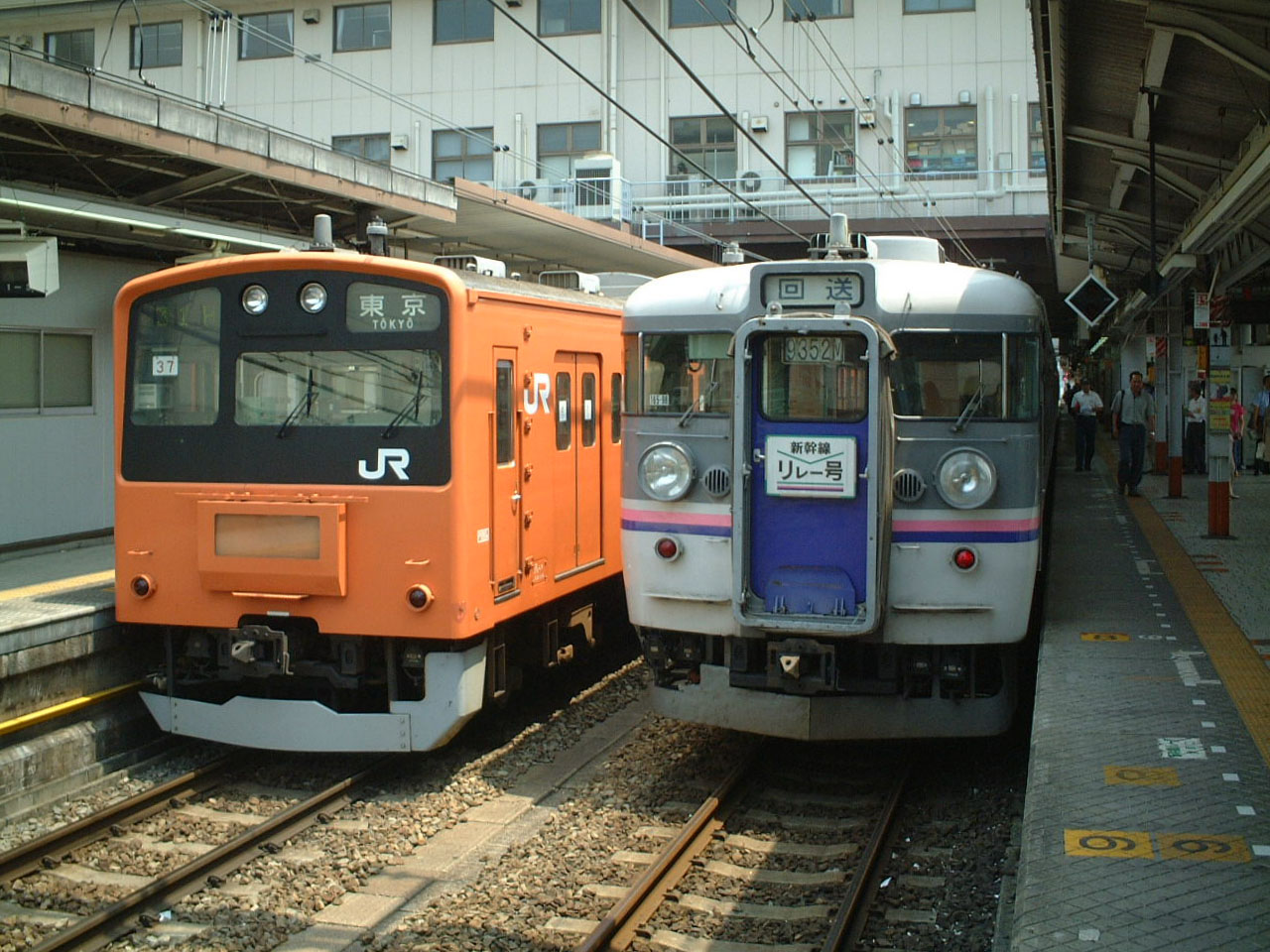
165 series EMU on a Shinkansen Relay rapid service at Hachiōji Station, August 2001

The Shinkansen Relay name was reintroduced between 1998 and 2001 for morning and evening limited-stop "Rapid Train" (快速, kaisoku) services between Hachiōji and Ōmiya via the Musashino Line to provide connections to northbound shinkansen services for passengers originating from the Chūō Line (Rapid) area. Services were introduced in 1997 as the Komachi Relay before becoming the Shinkansen Relay, and were formed of 6-car 165 and 169 series EMU formations. The services were renamed Musashino from 2001.

== Rapid Shinkansen Relay (April 2011) ==
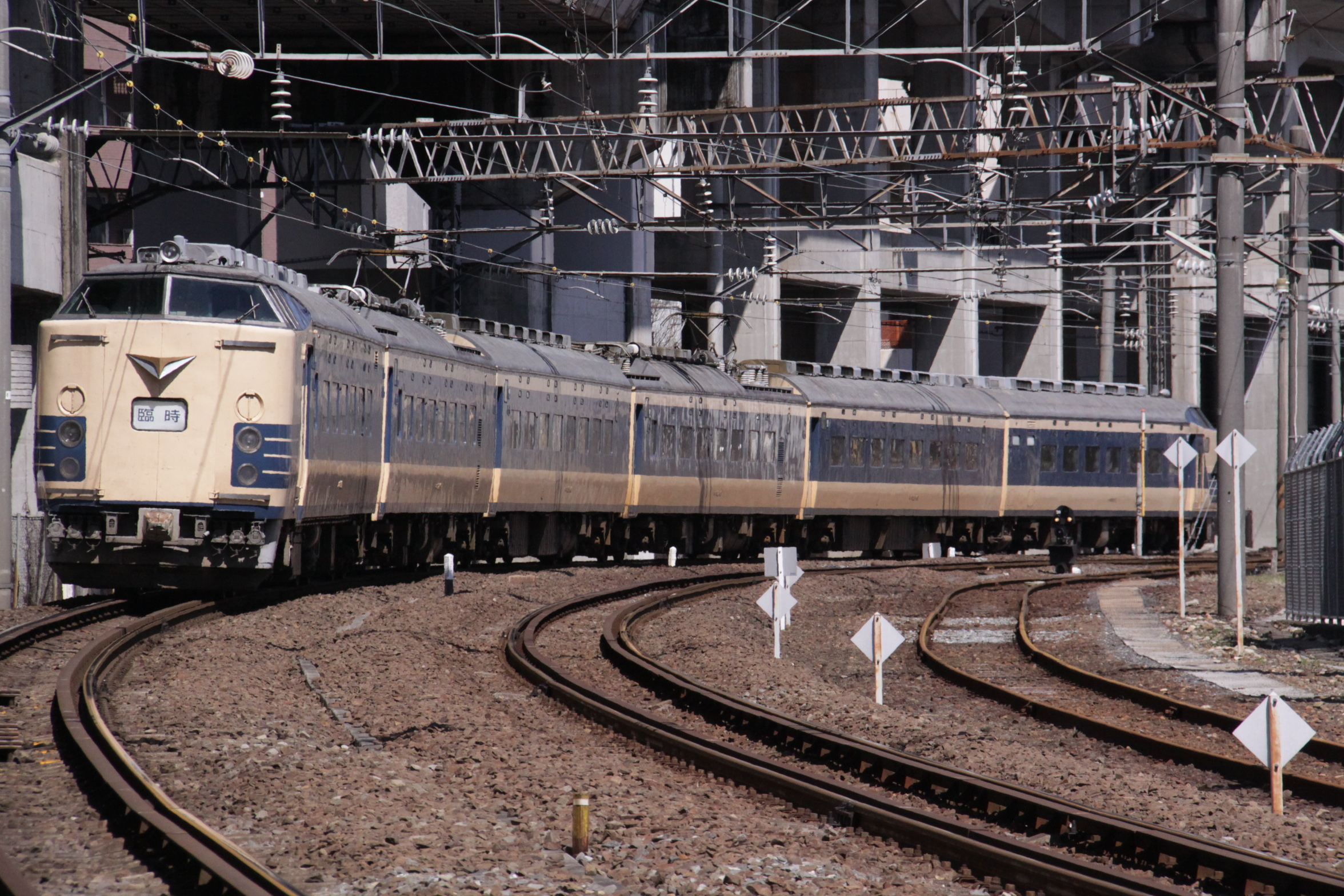
583 series EMU on a Shinkansen Relay rapid service at Sendai Station, April 2011

The Shinkansen Relay name was again used for a short period from 12 to 24 April 2011 for limited-stop "Rapid" services operated between Fukushima and Sendai via the Tohoku Main Line as a substitute for the Tohoku Shinkansen, which was closed over this section following the 11 March 2011 Tōhoku earthquake and tsunami. Trains were operated using 485 series, 583 series, and E721 series EMUs, with all seats non-reserved.
