= 185 series =

Japanese electric multiple unit train type

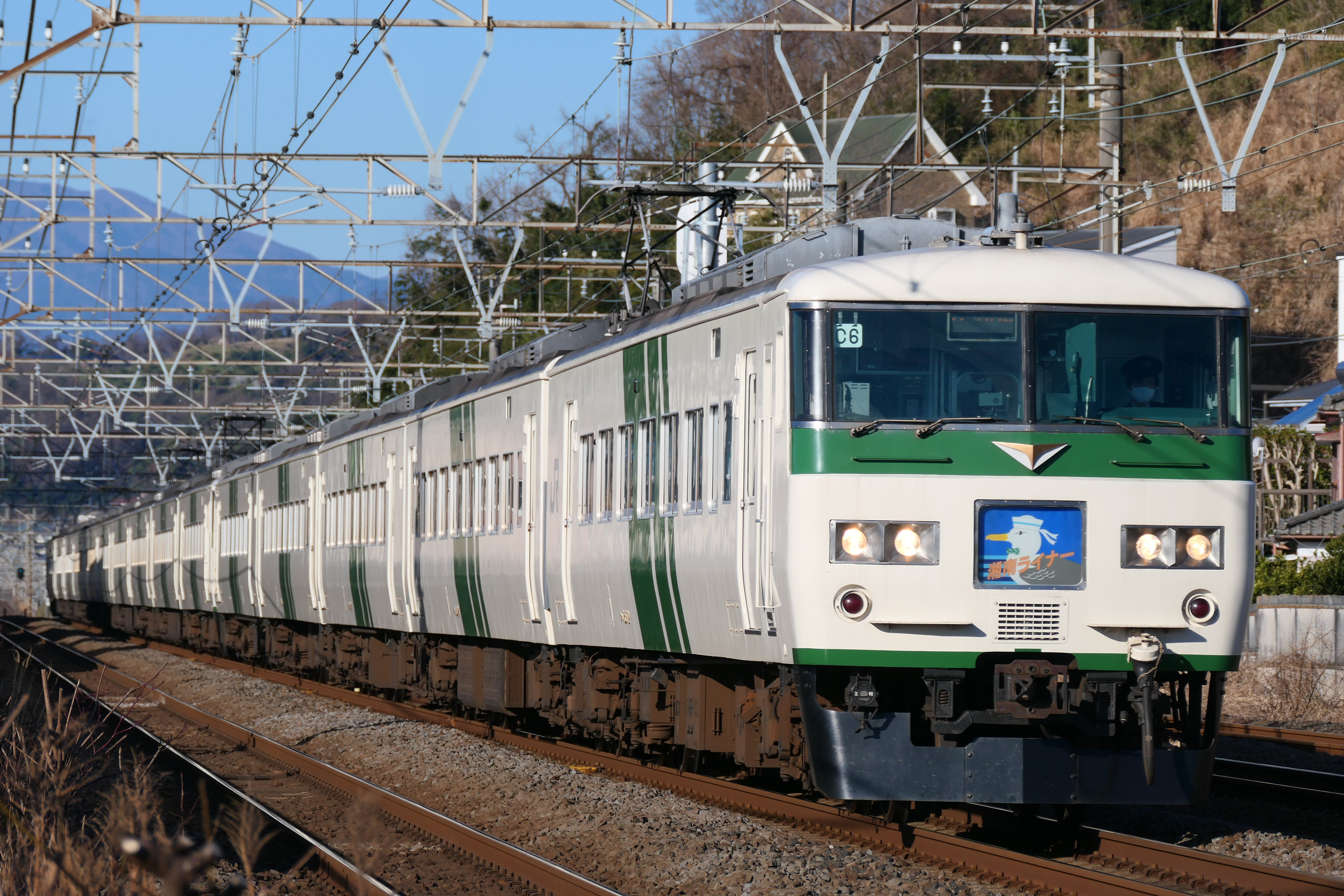
- A 185 series train on a Shonan Liner rapid service in February 2021
- In service: 1981–December 2024 (regular service ended in March 2021)
- Replaced: 153 series
- Constructed: 1981–1982
- Entered service: March 1981
- Refurbished: 1993–1998
- Scrapped: 2021–
- Number built: 227 cars
- Number preserved: 1 (front-end cab only)
- Successor: E257 series
- Formation: 5/6/7/10 cars per trainset
- Operators: JNR (1981–1987); JR East (1987–2024)
- Depot: Ōmiya

Specifications
- Car body construction: Steel
- Car length: 20.28 m (66 ft 6 in) (end cars); 20 m (65 ft 7 in)(intermediate cars)
- Width: 2,946 mm (9 ft 8.0 in)
- Height: 4,066 mm (13 ft 4.1 in)
- Doors: 2 per side
- Maximum speed: 110 km/h (68.4 mph)
- Traction system: Resistor control
- Power output: 120 kW per traction motor
- Electric system: 1,500 V DC overhead lines
- Current collection: Lozenge-type pantograph
- Safety systems: ATS-P, ATC, D-ATC
- Coupling system: Shibata-type
- Multiple working: 153 series (until 1983)
- Track gauge: 1,067 mm (3 ft 6 in)

The 185 series (Japanese: 185系) is an electric multiple unit (EMU) train type operated by the East Japan Railway Company (JR East) primarily on mid-distance limited express services centering on Tokyo. As of August 2024, two sets operate as Special Limited Express trains.

The class is broadly divided into two variants: 185–0 series for use south-west of Tokyo, and 185–200 series originally for use north of Tokyo.

== 185-0 series ==
The 185 series was primarily intended to replace ageing 153 series EMUs used on Izu express trains from Tokyo to the Izu Peninsula. The requirement was also for a "general-purpose" train that could also be used occasionally on local services. This resulted in a design featuring 1,000 mm (39 in) wide doors at either end of each car, compared with the standard limited express (e.g. 183 series) layout with 700 mm (28 in) wide doors at one end of each car.

A total of eight 10-car sets (sets A1 to A8, including two Green cars) and seven 5-car sets (sets C1 to C7) were built between 1979 and 1980 (115 vehicles in total), and delivered to Tamachi depot. Initially, they were phased in on Izu express trains from March 1981, working alongside (and sometimes coupled with) the older 153 series trains. In October 1981, the Izu express was upgraded to become the Odoriko limited express, with all trains formed of 185 series sets.

The Tamachi Depot fleet was transferred to Ōmiya Depot from the start of the 16 March 2013 timetable revision.

=== Formations ===
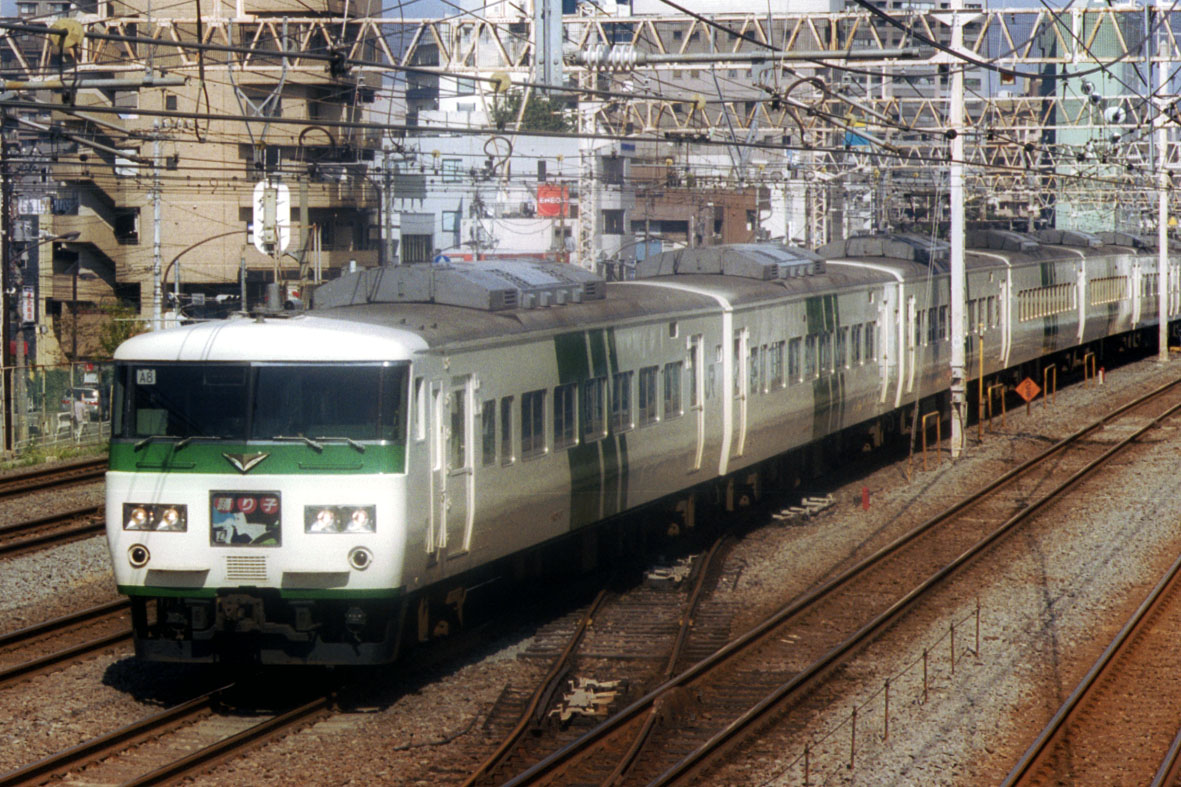
A 185–0 series in original colour scheme on an Odoriko service in October 2001

==== 10-car sets A1 to A8 ====
The 10-car sets A1 to A8 are formed as follows, with car 1 at the Izu end.

Car No.	1	2	3	4	5	6	7	8	9	10
Numbering	KuHa 185	MoHa 184	MoHa 185	SaRo 185		MoHa 184	MoHa 185	MoHa 184	MoHa 185	KuHa 185–100

Cars 3, 7, and 9 each have one lozenge-type pantograph.

==== 5-car sets C1 to C7 ====
The 5-car sets C1 to C7 are formed as follows, with car 11 at the Izu end.

Car No.	11	12	13	14	15
Numbering	KuHa 185	SaHa 185	MoHa 184	MoHa 185	KuHa 185–100

Car 14 is equipped with a lozenge-type pantograph.

=== Refurbishment ===
Between 1993 and 1998, the original Japanese-style toilets in cars 1, 5, and 10 of the A sets, and cars 11 and 15 of the C sets were replaced with western-style toilets. In 1998, the Green car seats were upgraded. Then, from 1999 to 2002, all sets underwent refurbishment, which primarily involved replacing the original flip-over seating in standard-class cars with rotating/reclining seats to bring the level of accommodation in line with other limited express rolling stock. Externally, the sets were repainted from the original white livery with diagonal green stripes to white with "Shōnan" green and orange blocks.

=== Interior ===
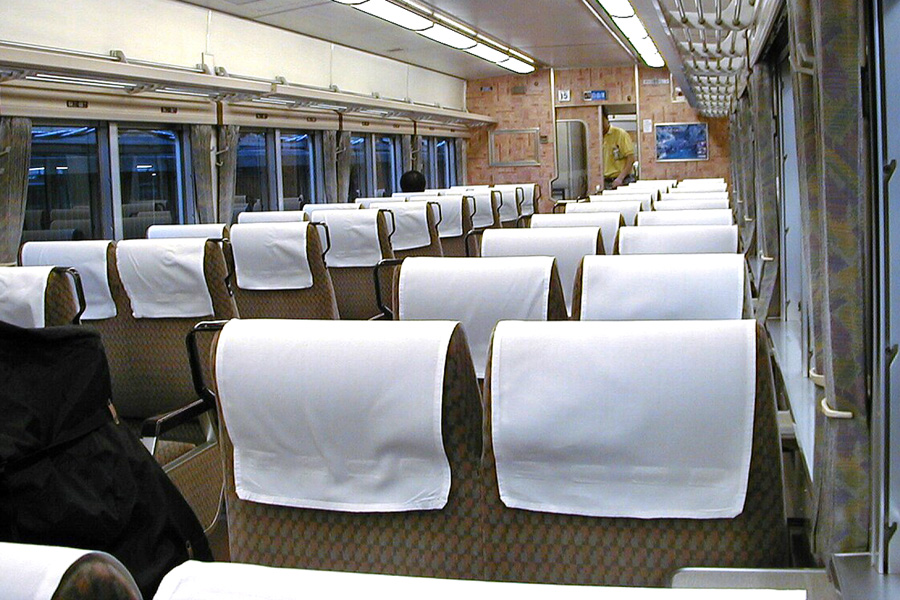
Interior view showing original flip-over seating in June 1999

== 185-200 series ==
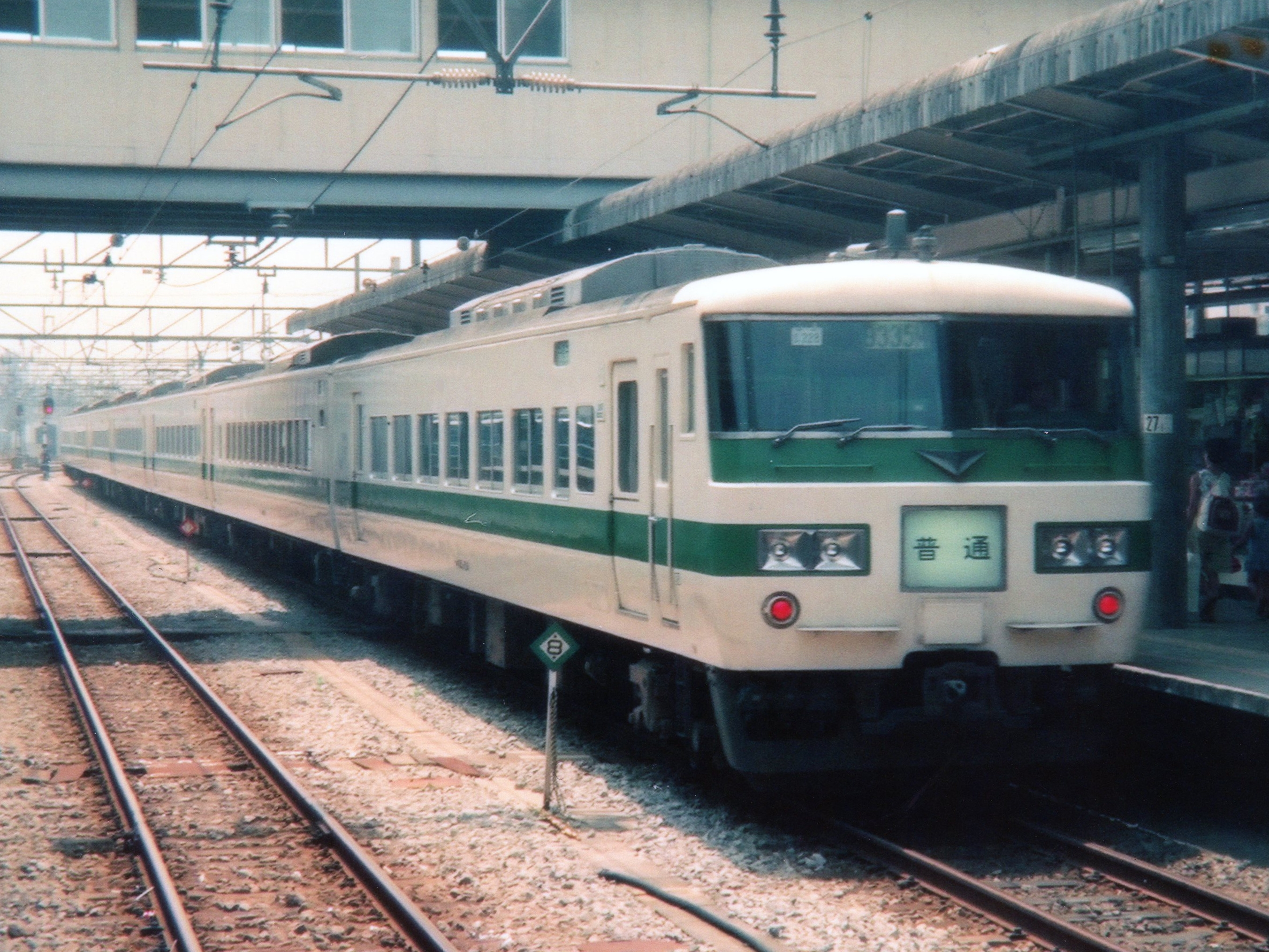
185-200 series in original colour scheme on a local service at Takasaki in 1991

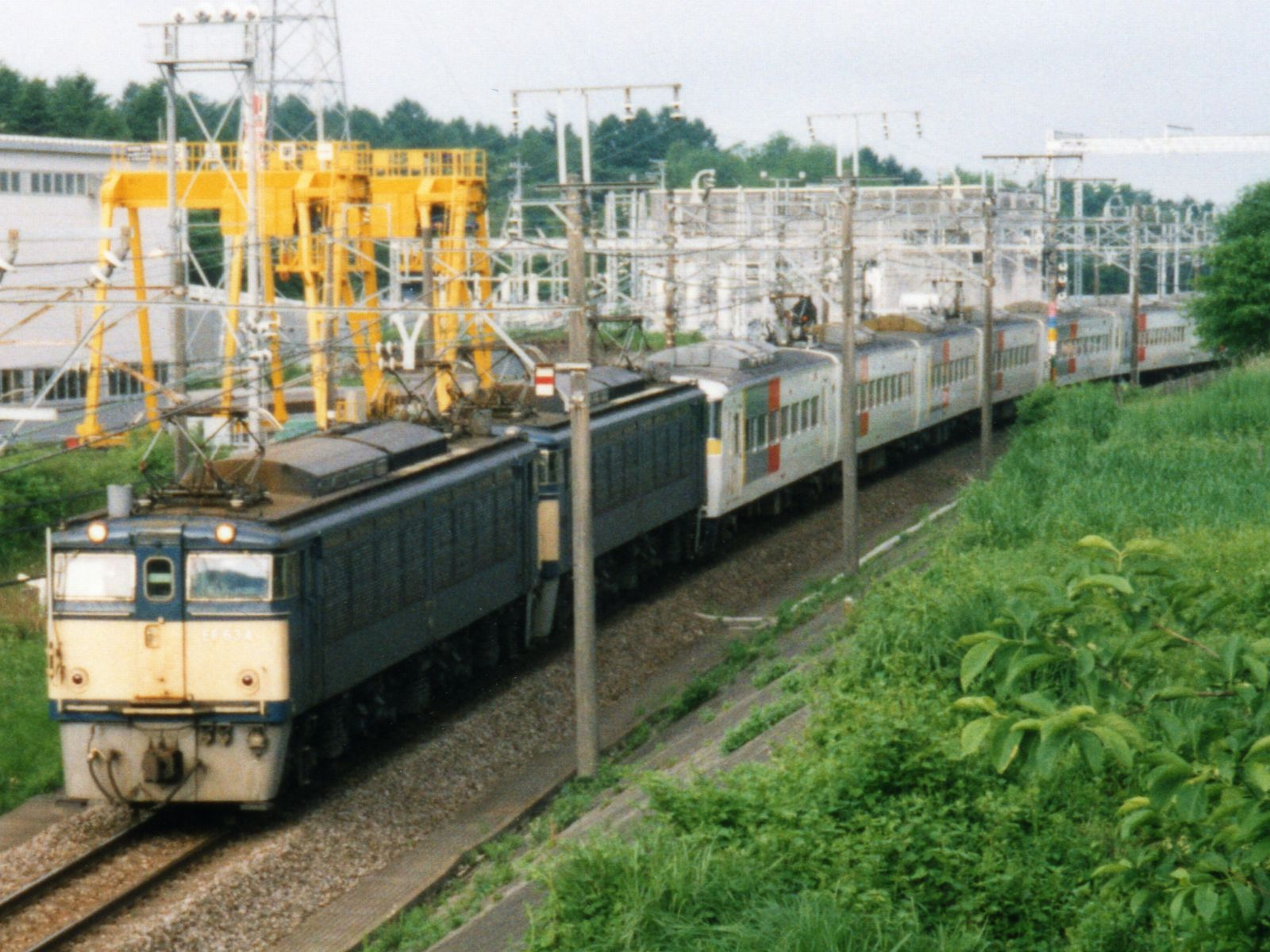
185-200 series EMU running in multiple with a pair of EF63 locomotives between Yokokawa and Karuizawa in July 1997

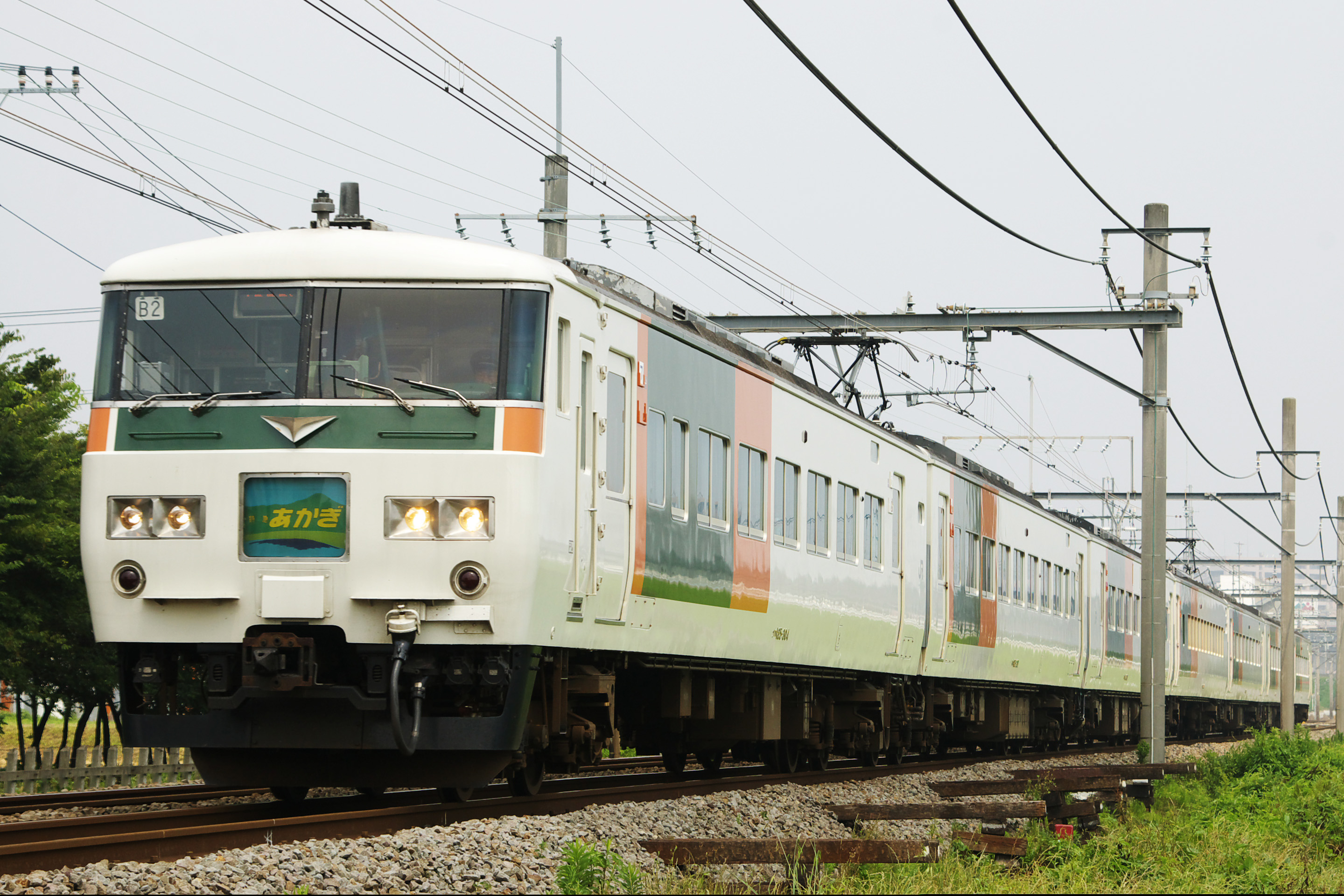
Tamachi-based 185–200 series 7-car set on an Akagi service in July 2008

Sixteen 7-car sets (112 vehicles) including one Green car were delivered between 1980 and 1981 to Shin-Maebashi depot to replace ageing 165 series EMUs. Compared with the earlier 185–0 series sets, these had cold-region specifications, including snow-resistant brakes, front-end horn covers, and were able to operate over the Usui Pass between Yokokawa and Karuizawa in conjunction with JNR Class EF63 electric locomotives. Livery was white with a single green band running the length of each car below the windows. The first trains were introduced on express services such as the Kusatsu and Karuizawa from December 1981.

The Ōmiya-based sets are used on Kusatsu (Ueno - Manza-Kazawaguchi), Minakami (Ueno - Minakami), and Akagi (Ueno - Maebashi) limited express services, as well as Weekend Akagi services. The Tamachi-based B sets are used on Ohayō Tochigi (Shinjuku - Kuroiso/Utsunomiya) and Hometown Tochigi (Shinjuku - Kuroiso) services as well as Odoriko and Hamakaiji limited express services.

From March 2013, the "OM" sets were reversed and reformed with the Green car moved from Car 6 to Car 4 to match the "B" sets transferred from Tamachi Depot. As of 1 April 2013, sets OM03, OM06, OM08, and OM09 remain unchanged.

=== Formations ===
==== 7-car sets OM01 to OM09 ====
The 7-car sets OM01 to OM09 are formed as follows, with car 1 at the south (Ueno/Izu) end.

Car No.	1	2	3	4	5	6	7
Numbering	KuHa 185-200	MoHa 184-200	MoHa 185-200	SaRo 185-200	MoHa 184-200	MoHa 185-200	KuHa 185–300

Cars 3 and 6 each have one lozenge-type pantograph.

==== 7-car sets B1 to B7 ====
The 7-car sets B1 to B7 (former Tamachi sets) are formed as follows, with car 1 at the south (Ueno/Izu) end.

Car No.	1	2	3	4	5	6	7
Numbering	KuHa 185-200	MoHa 184-200	MoHa 185-200	SaRo 185-200	MoHa 184-200	MoHa 185-200	KuHa 185–300

Cars 3 and 6 each have one lozenge-type pantograph.

==== Original "OM" 7-car sets ====
The 7-car "OM" sets based at Ōmiya were formed as follows prior to March 2013, with car 1 at the south (Ueno) end. As of 1 April 2013, sets OM03, OM06, OM08, and OM09 remain unchanged.

Car No.	1	2	3	4	5	6	7
Numbering	KuHa 185-300	MoHa 185-200	MoHa 184-200	MoHa 185-200	MoHa 184-200	SaRo 185-200	KuHa 185–200

Cars 2 and 4 each have one lozenge-type pantograph.

=== Shinkansen Relay ===
Between 23 June 1982 and March 1985, the 185–200 series trains were also used on special Shinkansen Relay shuttle services operating between Ueno in Tokyo and Ōmiya, the then southern terminus of the newly opened Tōhoku Shinkansen. These services ended in March 1985 when the shinkansen line was extended to Ueno. Four sets were then transferred to Tamachi depot for use on Odoriko services. These sets were reformed with the Green car moved from car 6 to car 4, and were repainted with diagonal green stripes to match the 185–0 series sets based at Tamachi depot. A further three sets were transferred to Tamachi between 1988 and 1991, becoming sets B1 to B7.

=== Refurbishment ===
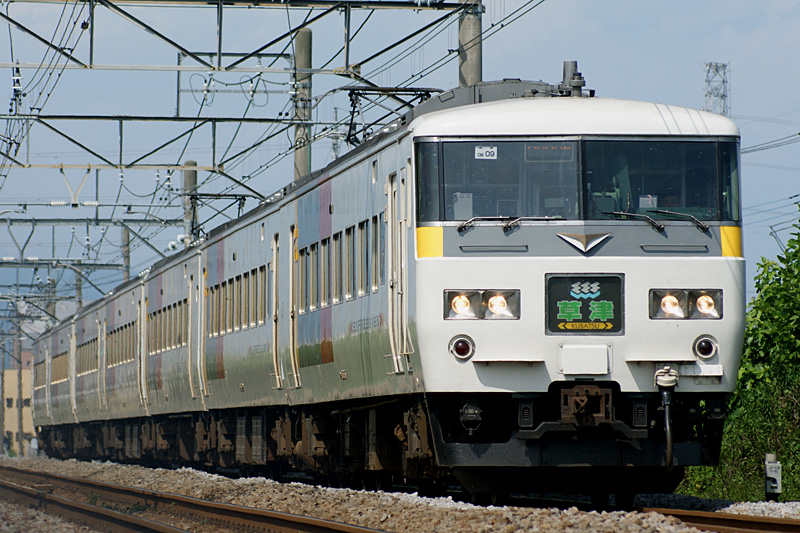
Refurbished 7-car 185–200 series set on a Kusatsu limited express service in July 2008

Between 1993 and 1998, the original Japanese-style toilets in cars 1, 4, and 7 of the Tamachi-based B sets were replaced with western-style toilets.

The nine sets remaining at Shin-Maebashi depot were all refurbished between September 1995 and November 1996. Refurbishment involved replacing the original flip-over seating in standard-class cars with rotating/reclining seats. Externally, the sets were repainted in white with yellow/grey/red blocks intended to represent the Jōmō mountain range together with "EXPRESS 185" markings below the windows.

In March 2006, the Shin-Maebashi-based sets were transferred to Ōmiya depot, becoming sets OM01 to OM09.

Between March and June 1996, three of the 7-car sets based at Tamachi (B3 to B5) were fitted with ATC equipment for use on the Keihin-Tōhoku Line and Negishi Line when operating on Hamakaiji services. These sets were upgraded with D-ATC equipment between January 2006 and March 2007.

=== Interior ===
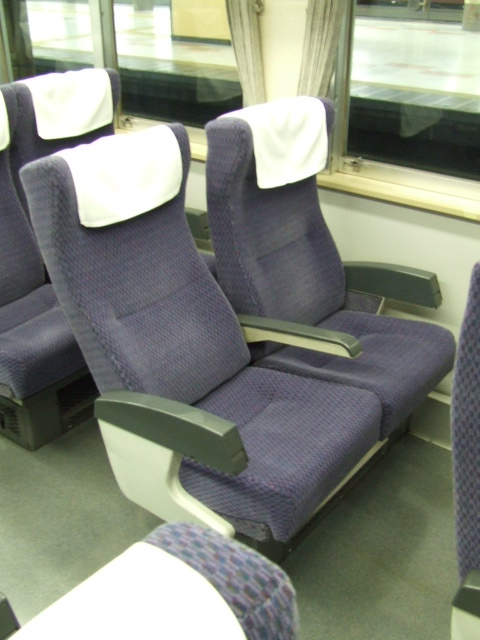
Standard-class seating in refurbished 185–200 series train in September 2006

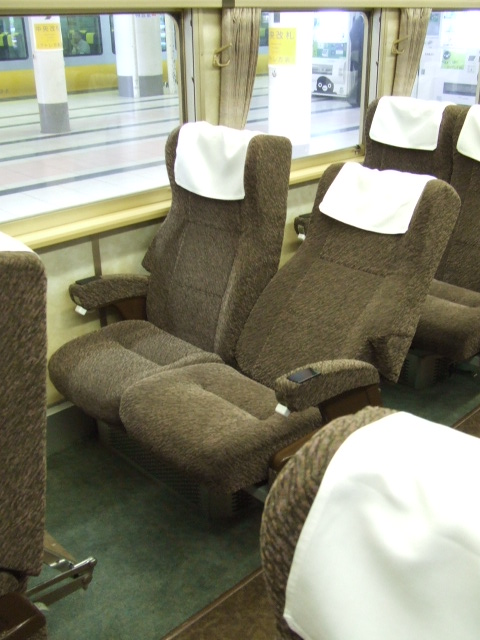
Green-class seating in refurbished 185–200 series train in September 2006

== Reliveried sets ==
=== Shōnan-livery OM03 ===
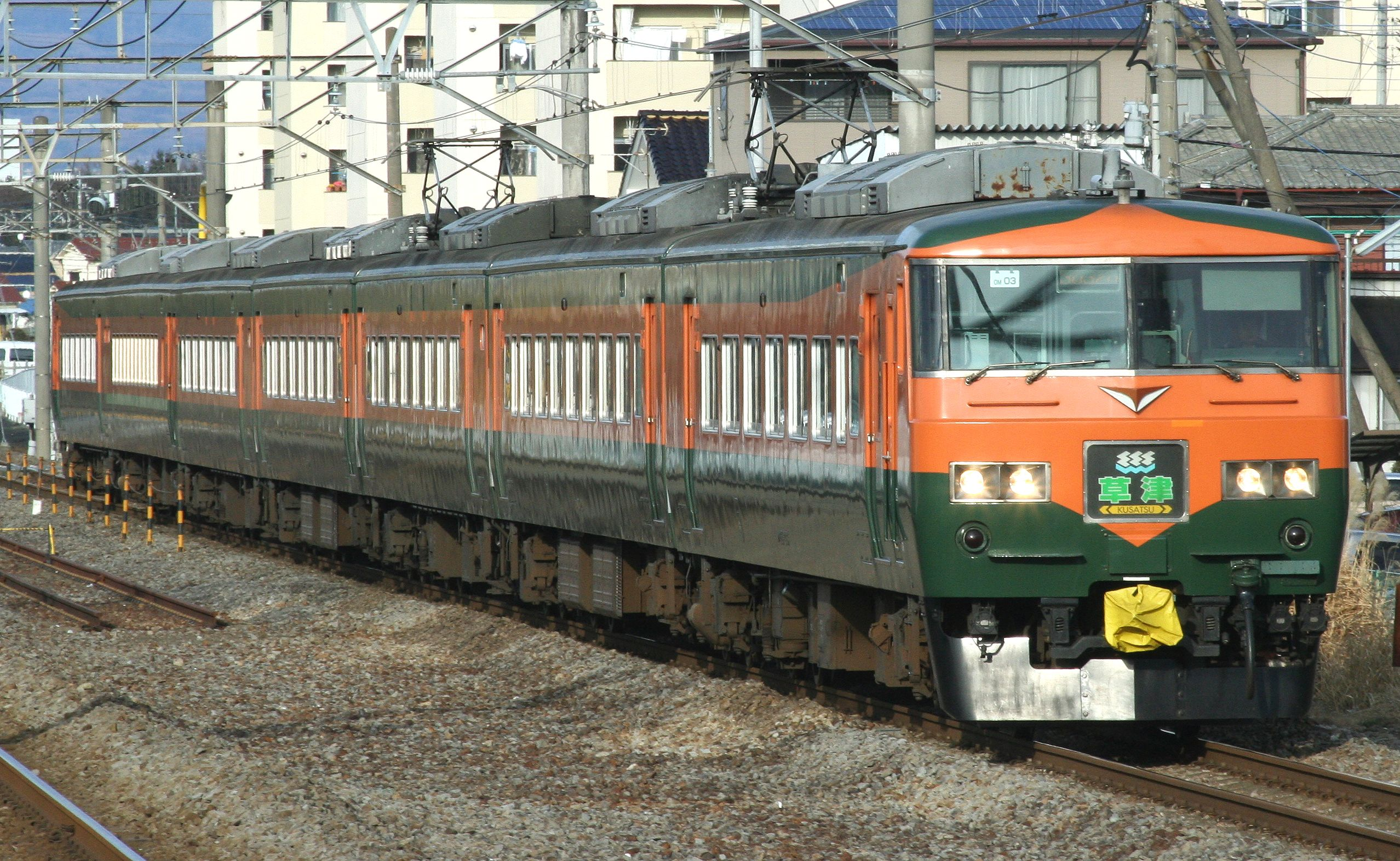
Shōnan-liveried set OM03 in January 2012

In September 2010, 7-car set OM03 was repainted into the Shōnan colour scheme of orange and green (never previously carried by this type) to recreate the appearance of the early 80 series EMUs, as part of the 50th anniversary celebrations of the Kusatsu limited express service scheduled for October of that year.

=== Original Odoriko-livery A8 ===
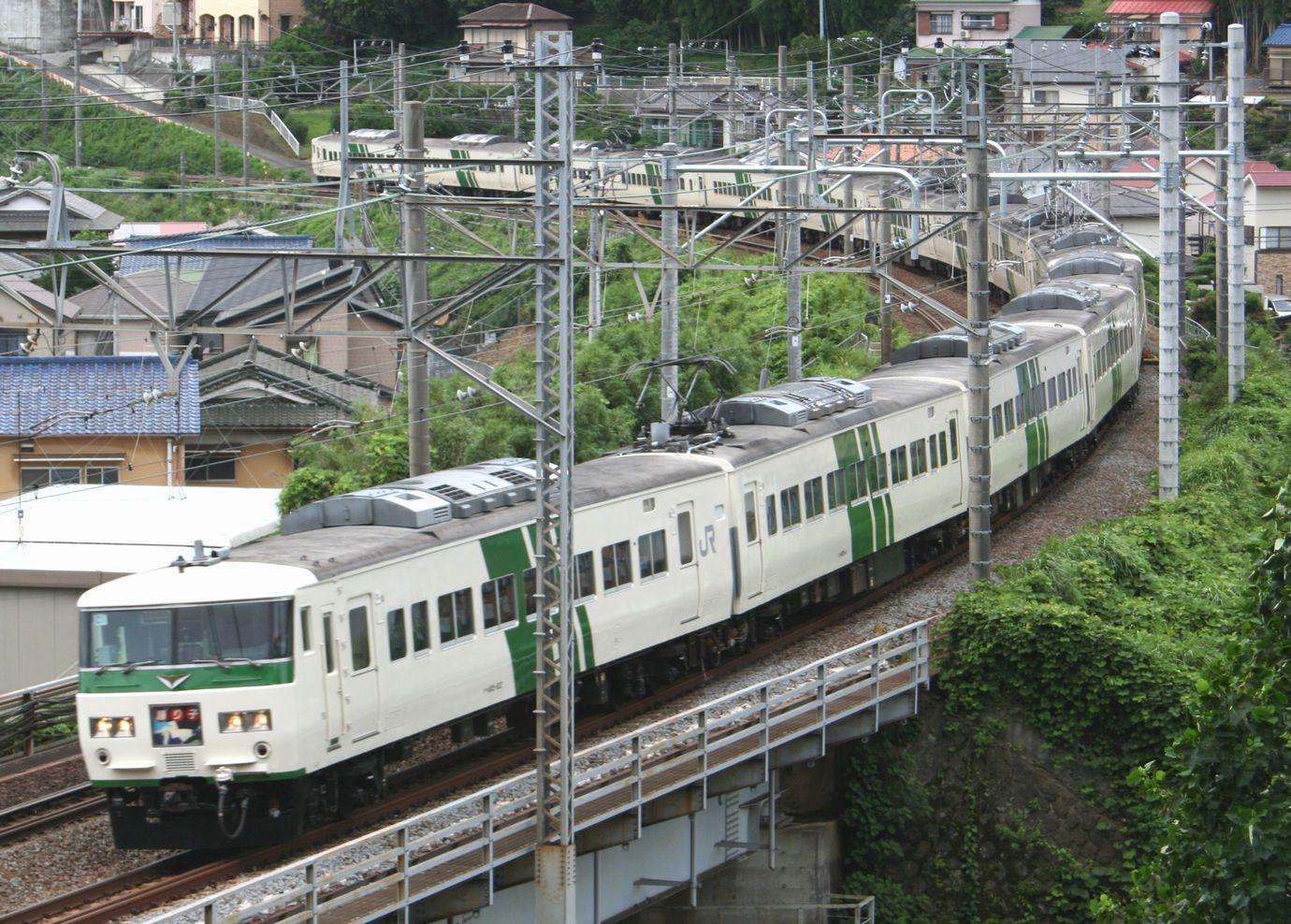
Sets A8 and C1 in original Odoriko livery in July 2012

In July 2011, 10-car Tamachi-based set A8 was repainted into the original Odoriko colour scheme of white with green diagonal stripes at Ōmiya Works.

=== Original Odoriko-livery C1 ===
In June 2012, 5-car Tamachi-based set C1 was repainted into the original Odoriko colour scheme of white with green diagonal stripes at Ōmiya Works.

=== Amagi-livery OM08 ===
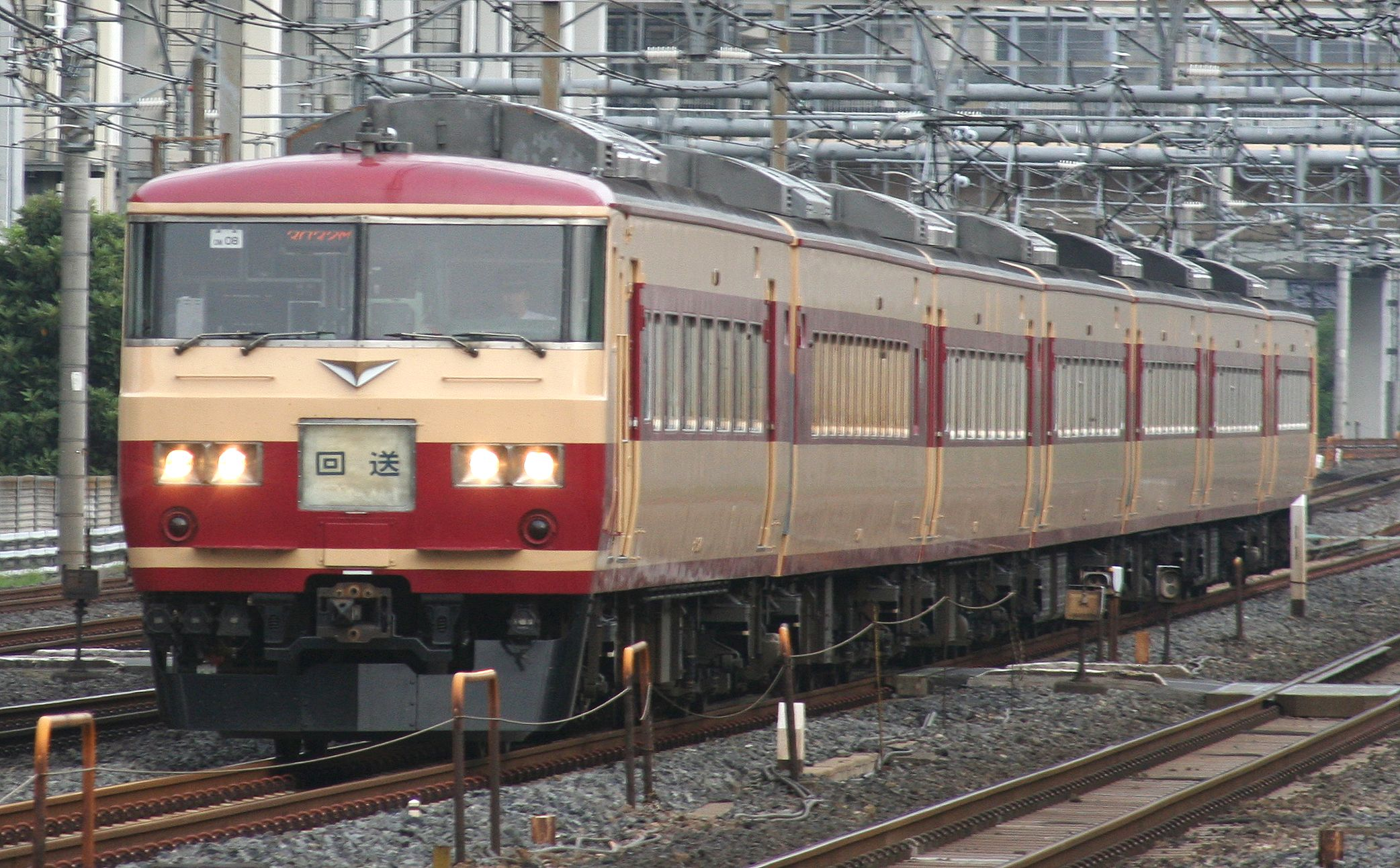
Amagi-liveried set OM08 in April 2012

In February 2012, 7-car set OM08 was repainted into the JNR colour scheme of beige and maroon (never previously carried by this type) at Ōmiya Works to recreate the appearance of the early 157 series EMUs used on Amagi services.

== Withdrawal ==
East Japan Railway Company has recently announced that all 185 series sets will be scrapped by 2022. As of Summer 2024 two six-car units still remain operational for rail tours and other special services.
