= 169 series =

Japanese train type

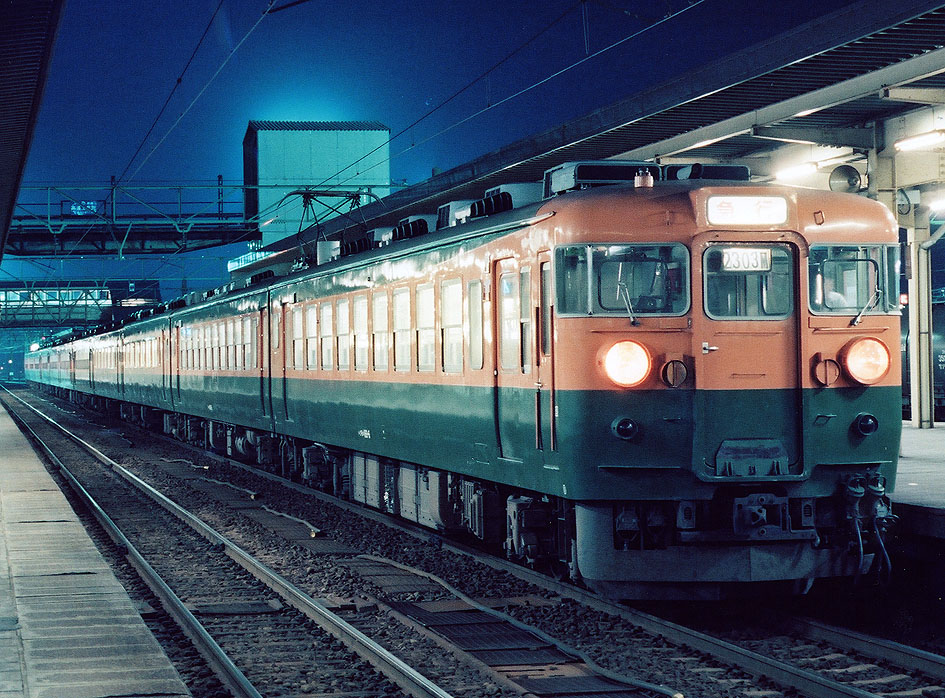
- A 169 series set in Shonan livery in July 1982
- In service: 1969–2013
- Manufacturers: Kinki Sharyo, Nippon Sharyo, Tokyu Car Corporation
- Number built: 187 vehicles
- Number in service: None
- Number preserved: 4 vehicles
- Operators: JNR (1969–1987); JR East (1987–1996); Shinano Railway (1997–2013)

Specifications
- Maximum speed: 110 km/h (68 mph)
- Traction system: Resistor control
- Power supply: 1,500 V DC overhead
- Bogies: DT32, TR69
- Multiple working: 165 series
- Track gauge: 1,067 mm (3 ft 6 in)

The 169 series (169系) was an express electric multiple unit (EMU) train type introduced in 1969 by Japanese National Railways (JNR), and later operated by East Japan Railway Company (JR East) until 1996 and by Shinano Railway in Nagano Prefecture until 2013. The 169 series was developed from the 165 series EMUs.

== Interior ==
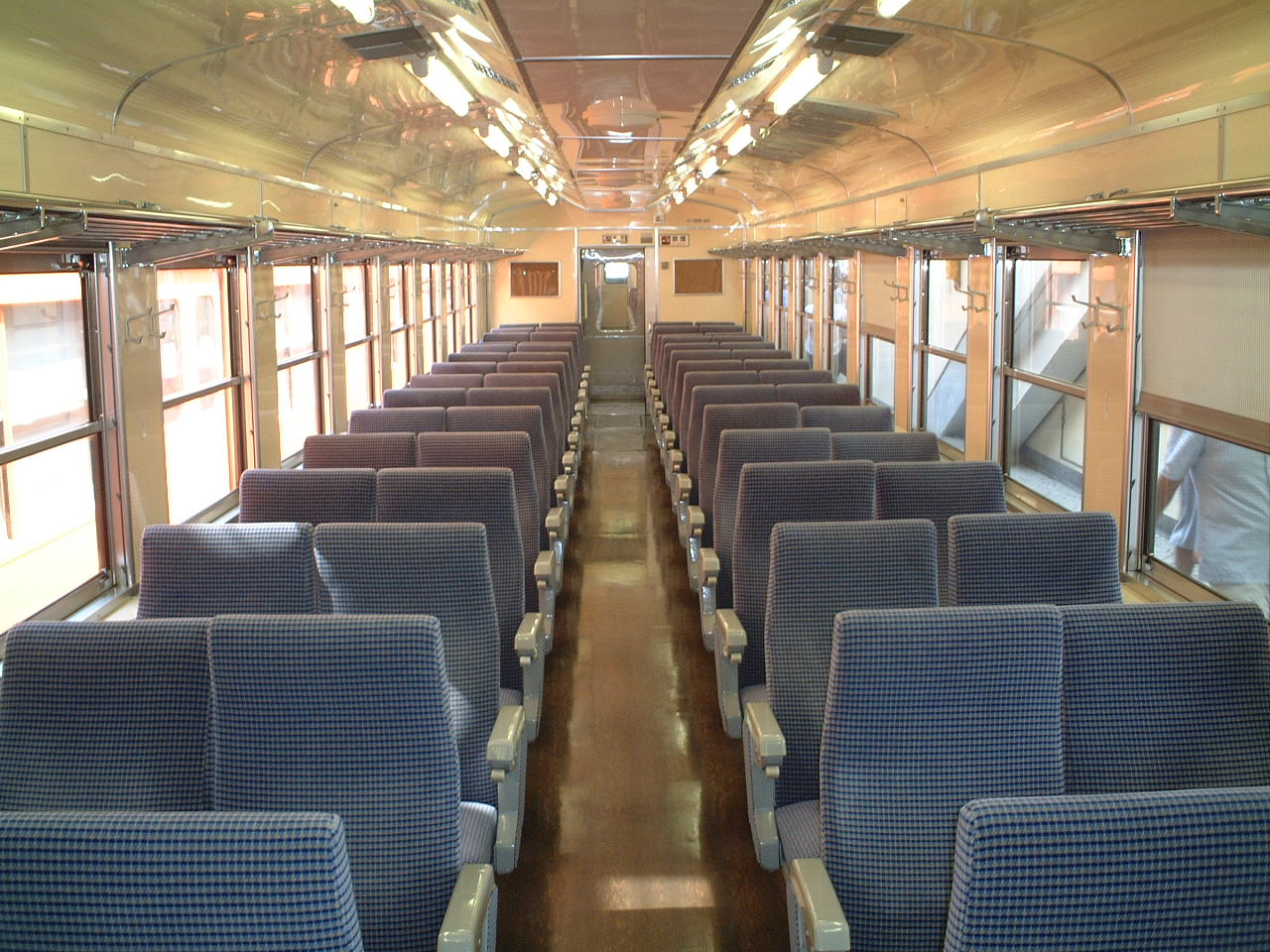
Interior of Mitaka Depot set modified with reclining seats for use on Shinkansen Relay rapid services, 2001

== Livery variations ==
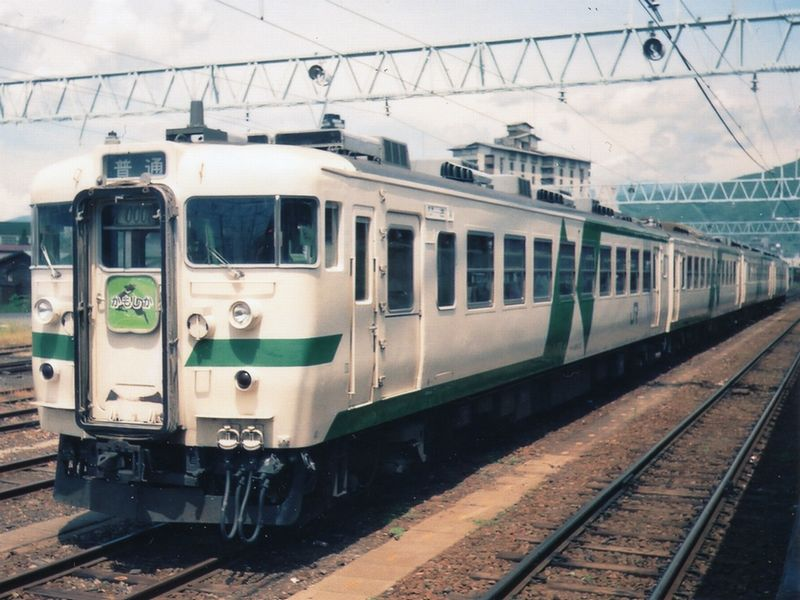
"New Express" livery in 1987

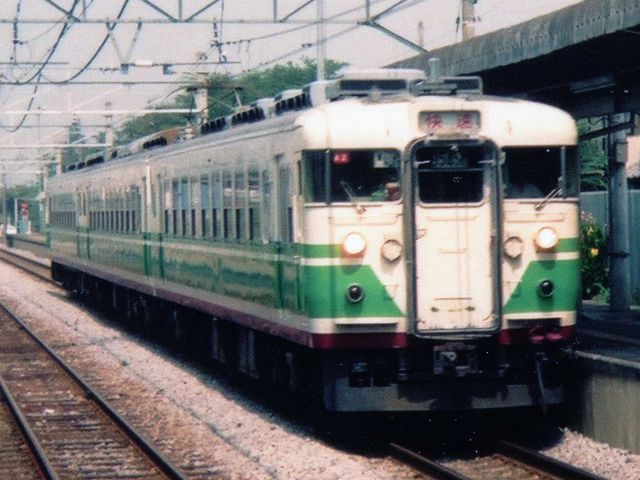
Early "Nagano" livery in 1991

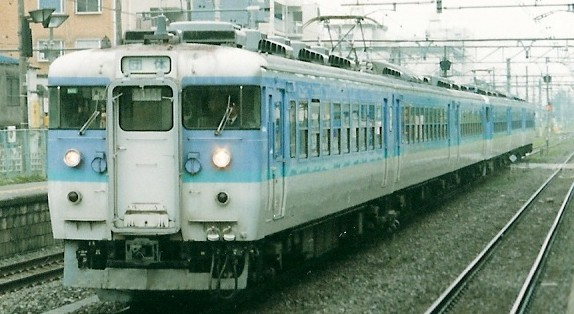
"Shinshu" livery

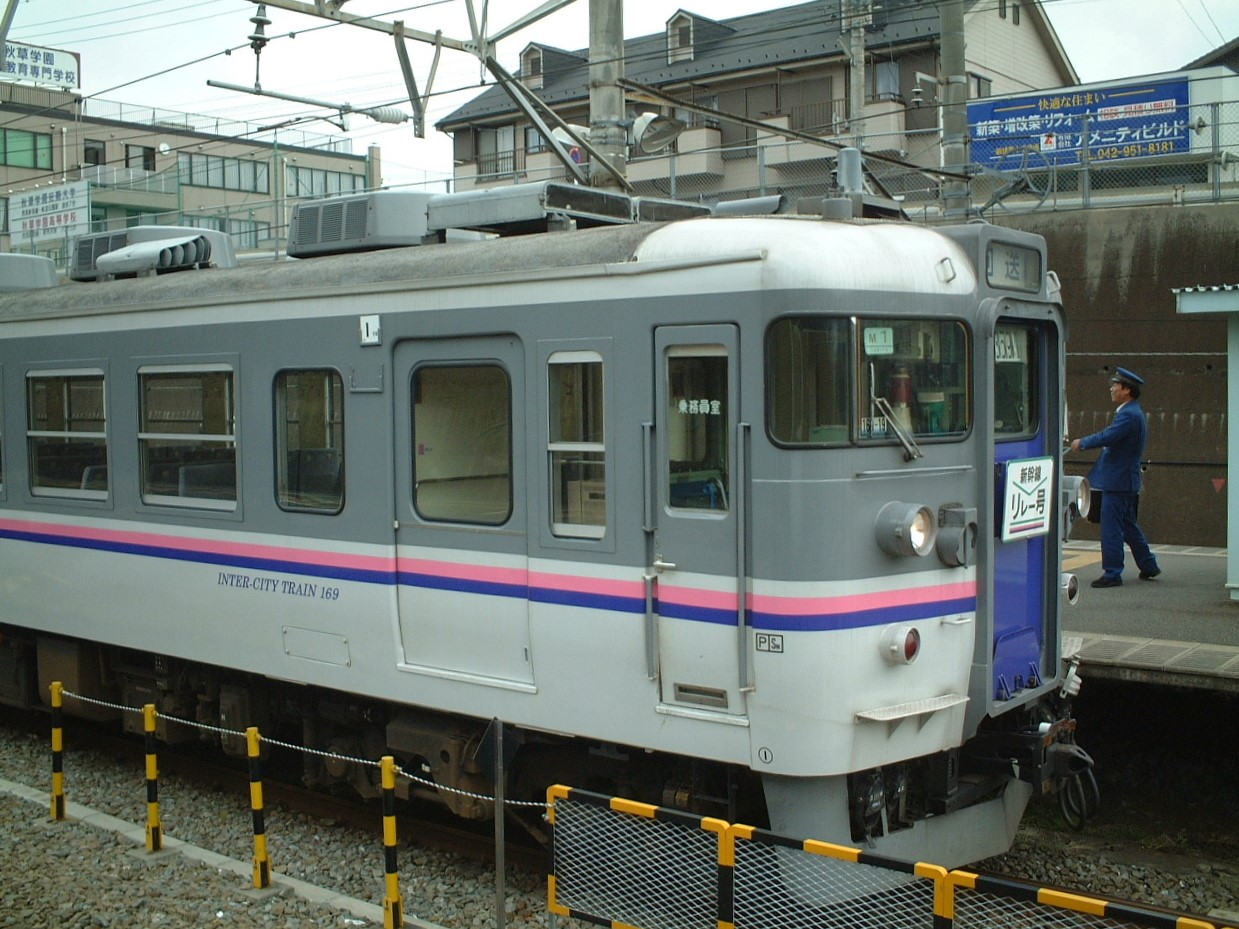
Shinkansen Relay livery in May 2001

== Shinano Railway ==
The third-sector operator Shinano Railway operated a fleet of three 3-car 169 series sets (numbered S51 to S53) formerly operated by JR East. These operated on services between Karuizawa and Togura Stations. These sets were scheduled to be withdrawn from regular service in April 2013, with final runs on 29 April 2013.

=== Formations ===
The 3-car sets operated by Shinano Railway were formed as shown below, with two motored cars (KuMoHa and MoHa) and one trailer car (KuHa).

Numbering	KuMoHa 169	MoHa 168	KuHa 169

The MoHa 168 car was fitted with one lozenge-type pantograph.

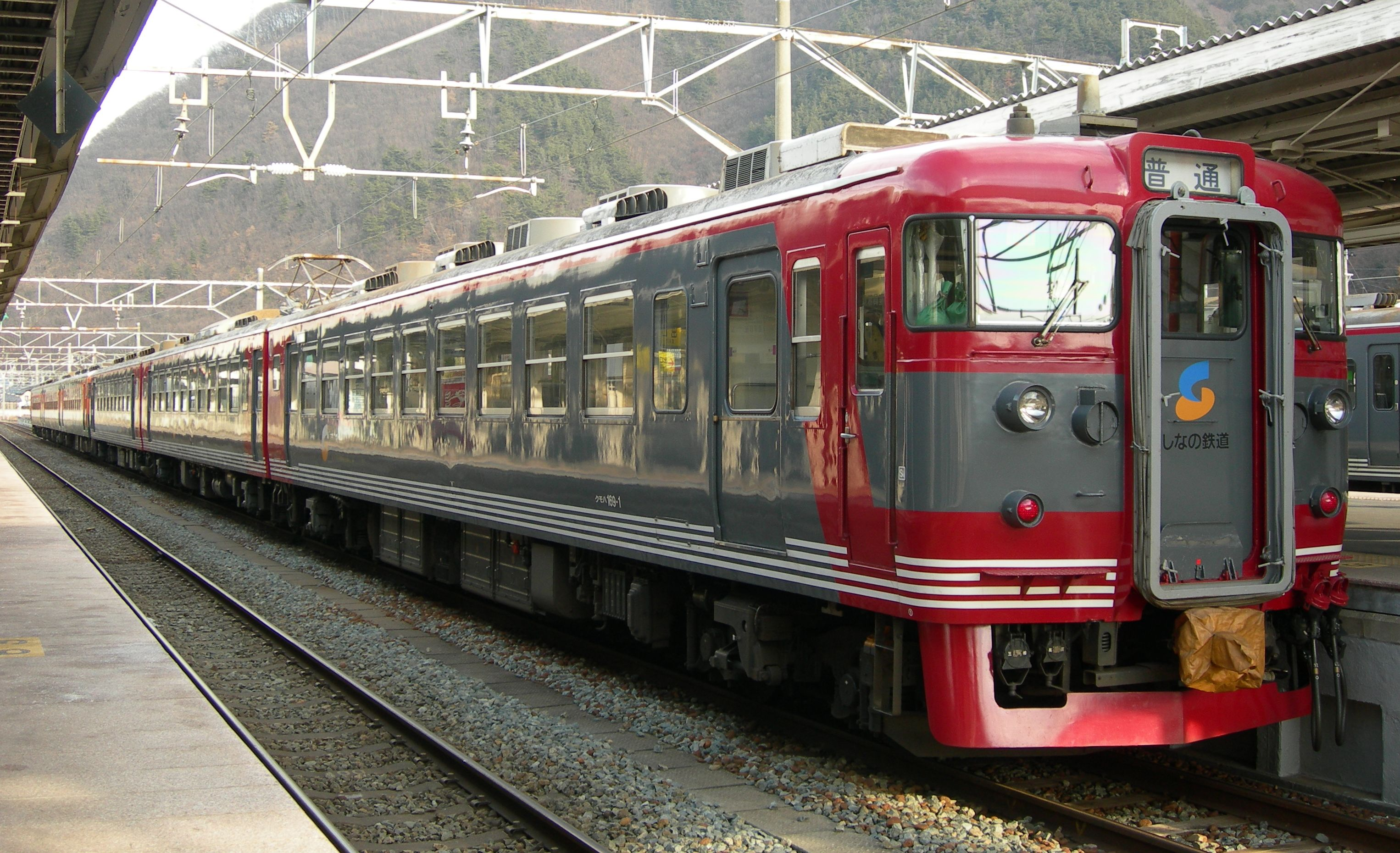
Shinano Railway 169 series set S51 in January 2011

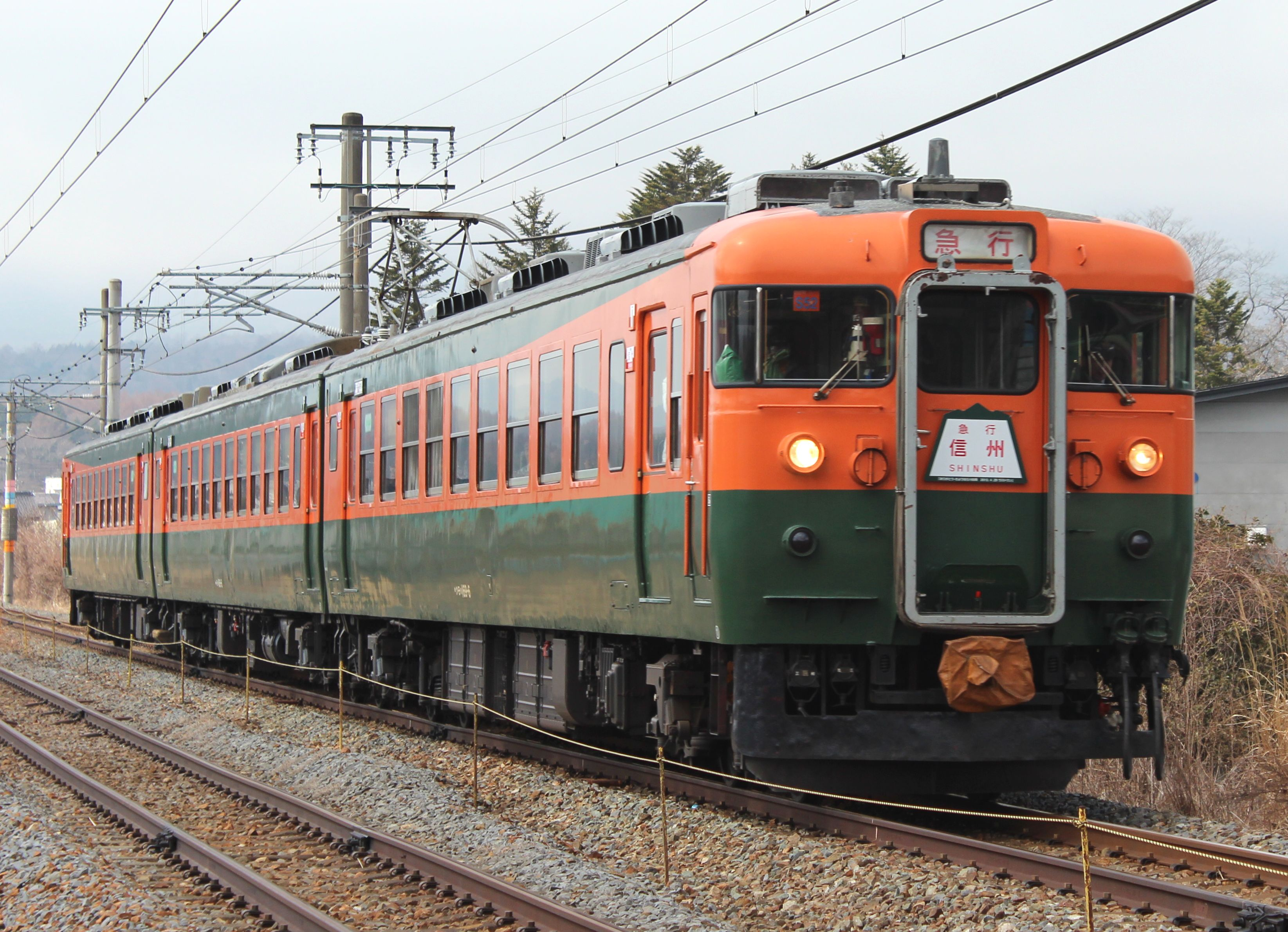
Shinano Railway 169 series set S52 in JNR Shonan livery in March 2013

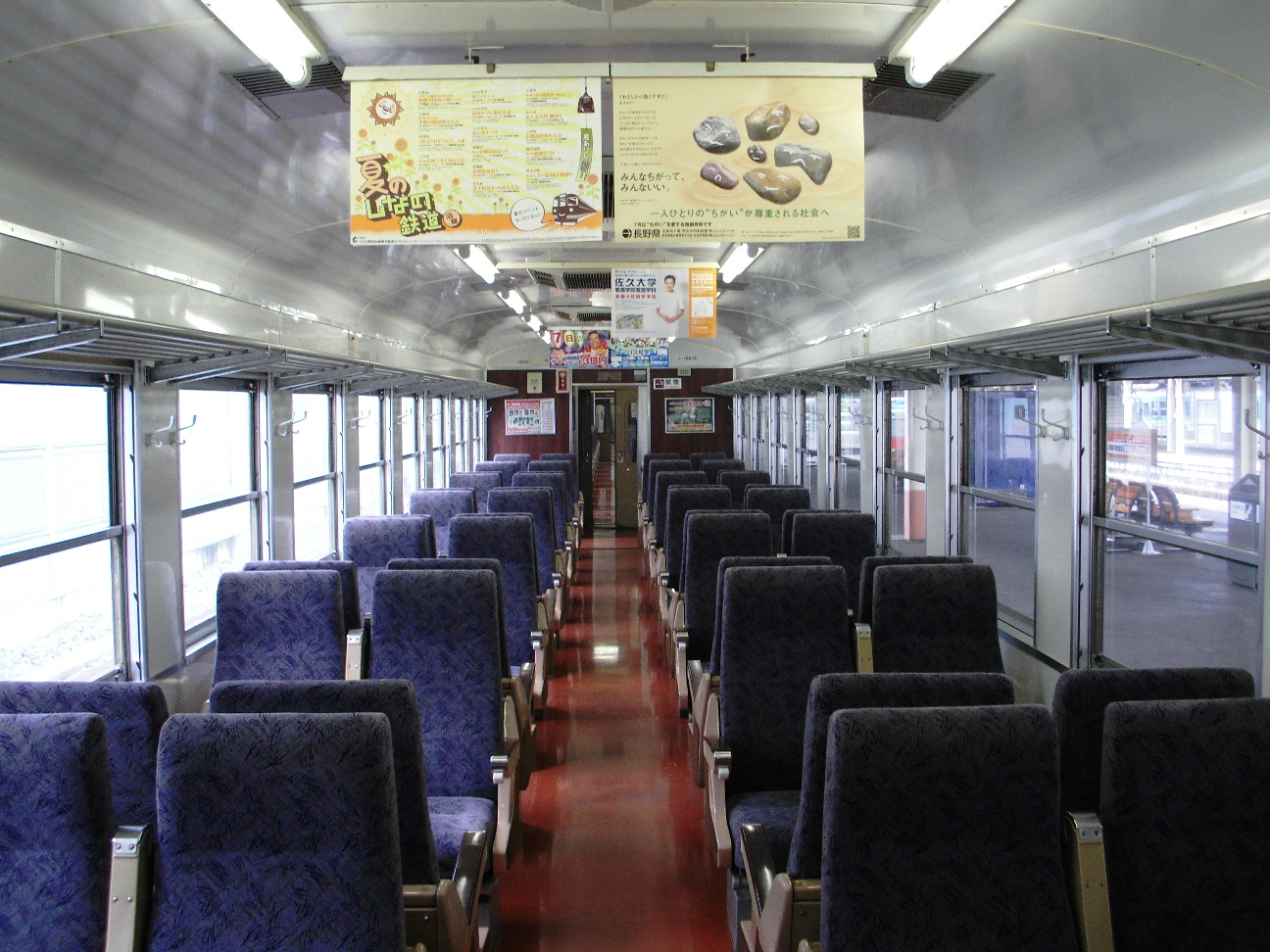
Interior of a Shinano Railway 169 series

== Preserved examples ==
As of 2014, four 169 series cars are preserved, as follows.

- KuMoHa 169 1: Next to Sakaki Station on the Shinano Railway in Sakaki, Nagano
- KuMoHa 169 6: Next to Karuizawa Station in Karuizawa, Nagano
- KuHa 169 27: Next to Sakaki Station on the Shinano Railway in Sakaki, Nagano
- MoHa 168 1: Next to Sakaki Station on the Shinano Railway in Sakaki, Nagano
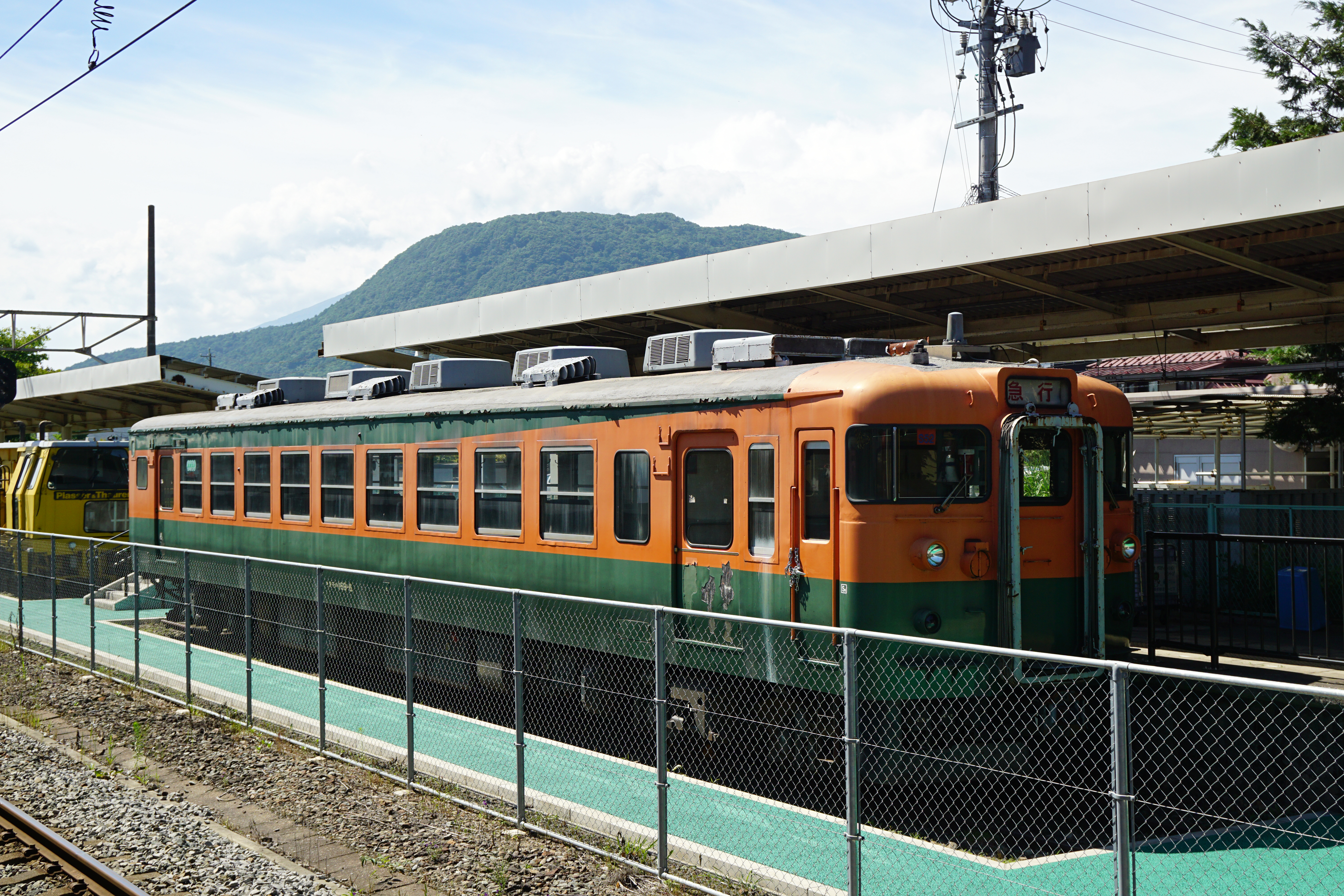
Preserved KuMoHa 169 6 next to Karuizawa Station in July 2016

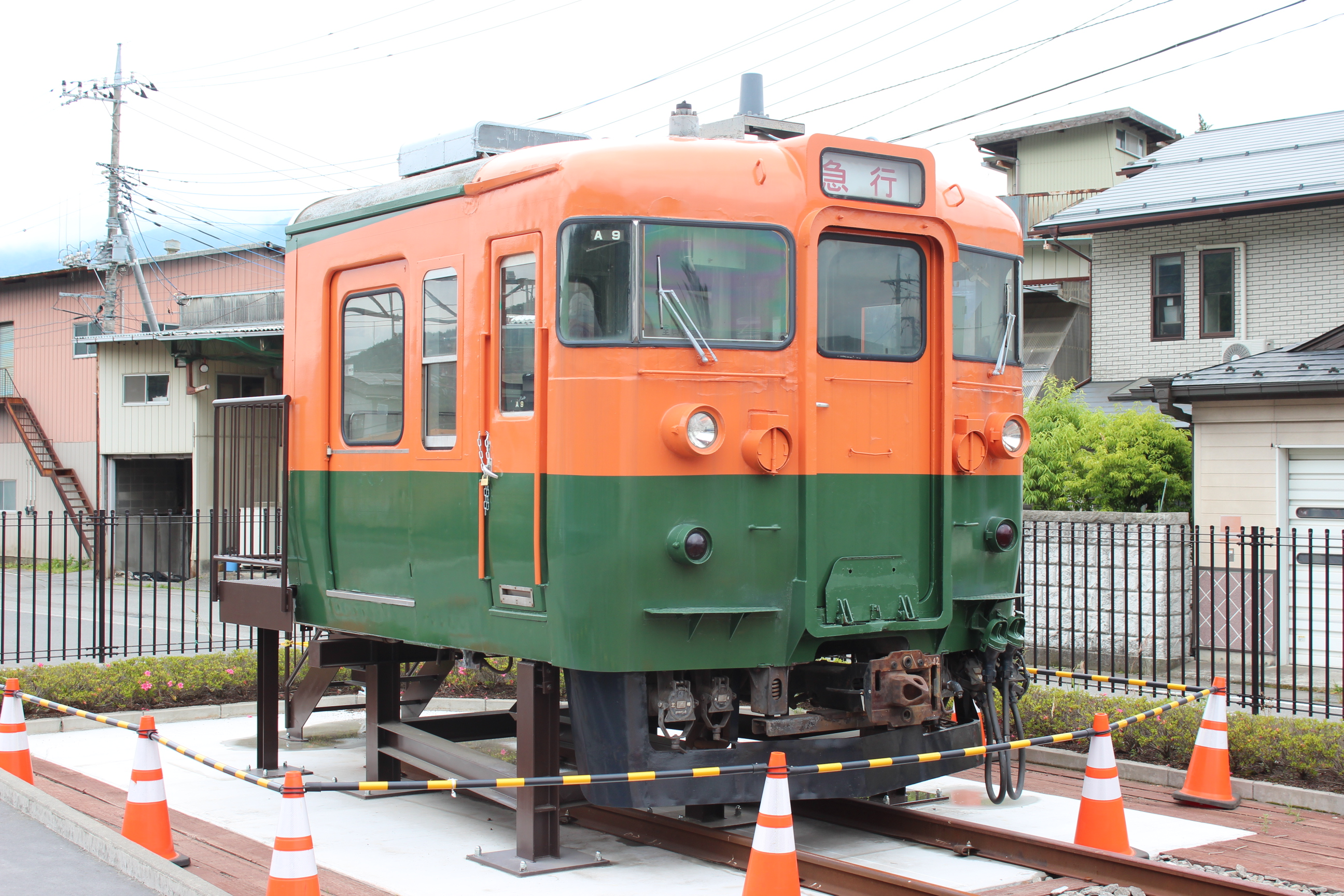
The cab end of car KuMoHa 169 27 preserved next to Shimoyoshida Station on the Fujikyuko Line in Yamanashi Prefecture
