= Akigase Park =

Park in Japan

Coordinates: 35°50′55.1″N 139°36′18.6″E

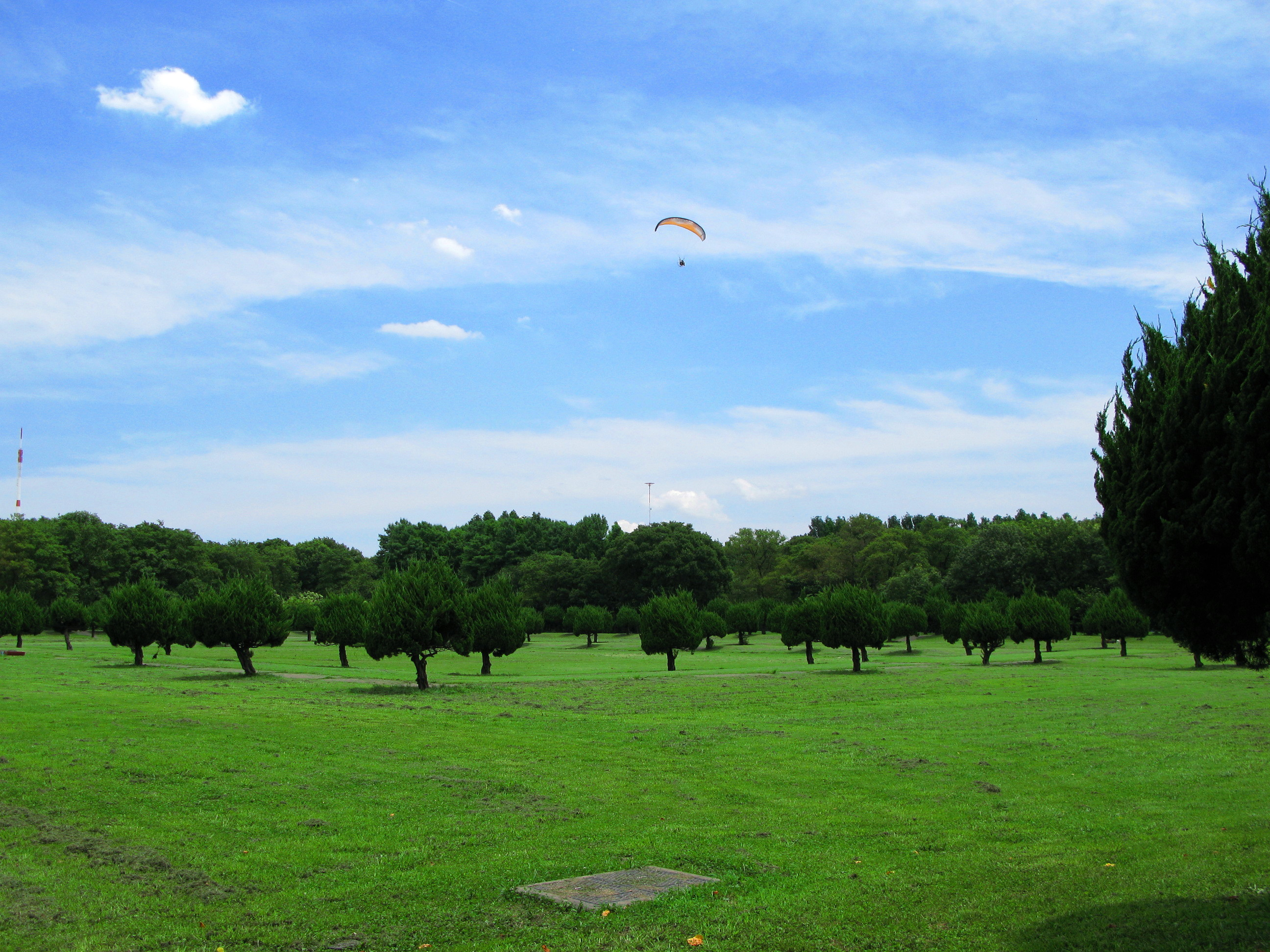
Akagase Park

Akigase Park (秋ヶ瀬公園, Akigase kōen) is a park in Japan that occupies a section of flood plain of the Arakawa River, which is located at the western edge of Saitama City. The park covers an area of 100.1ha on the eastern side of the river between its northern boundary, 3 km north of the Akigase Bridge, and the southern boundary, the Hanekura Bridge.

In 1971, former Urawa City established the park as a measure to manage the rising issue of insufficient park availability stemmed from rapid urban expansion. Baseball fields, soccer fields, and tennis courts, along with patches of pristine forest make up its grounds.

== Access ==
- Taking a bus from Urawa Station toward Shiki Station for 20 minutes and getting off at Sakurasō Park Stop.
