= Asaka, Saitama =

Asaka 朝霞市
- City
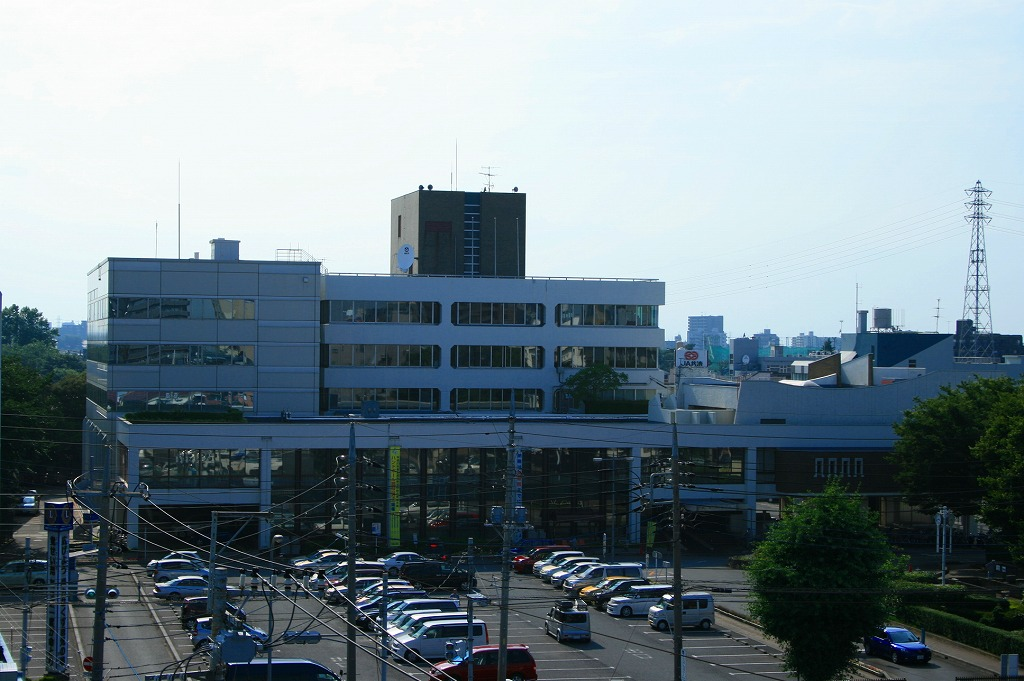
- Asaka City Hall

- Flag Seal

- Location of Asaka in Saitama Prefecture

- Location within Japan
- Coordinates: 35°47′49.9″N 139°35′38″E
- Country: Japan
- Region: Kantō
- Prefecture: Saitama

Area
  - Total: 18.34 km^{2} (7.08 sq mi)

Population (January 1, 2021)
  - Total: 143,195
  - Density: 7,808/km^{2} (20,220/sq mi)
- Time zone: UTC+9 (Japan Standard Time)
- Tree: Zelkova serrata
- Flower: Azalea
- Phone number: 048-463-1111
- Address: 1-1-1 Honcho, Asaka-shi, Saitama-ken 351-8501
- Website: Official website

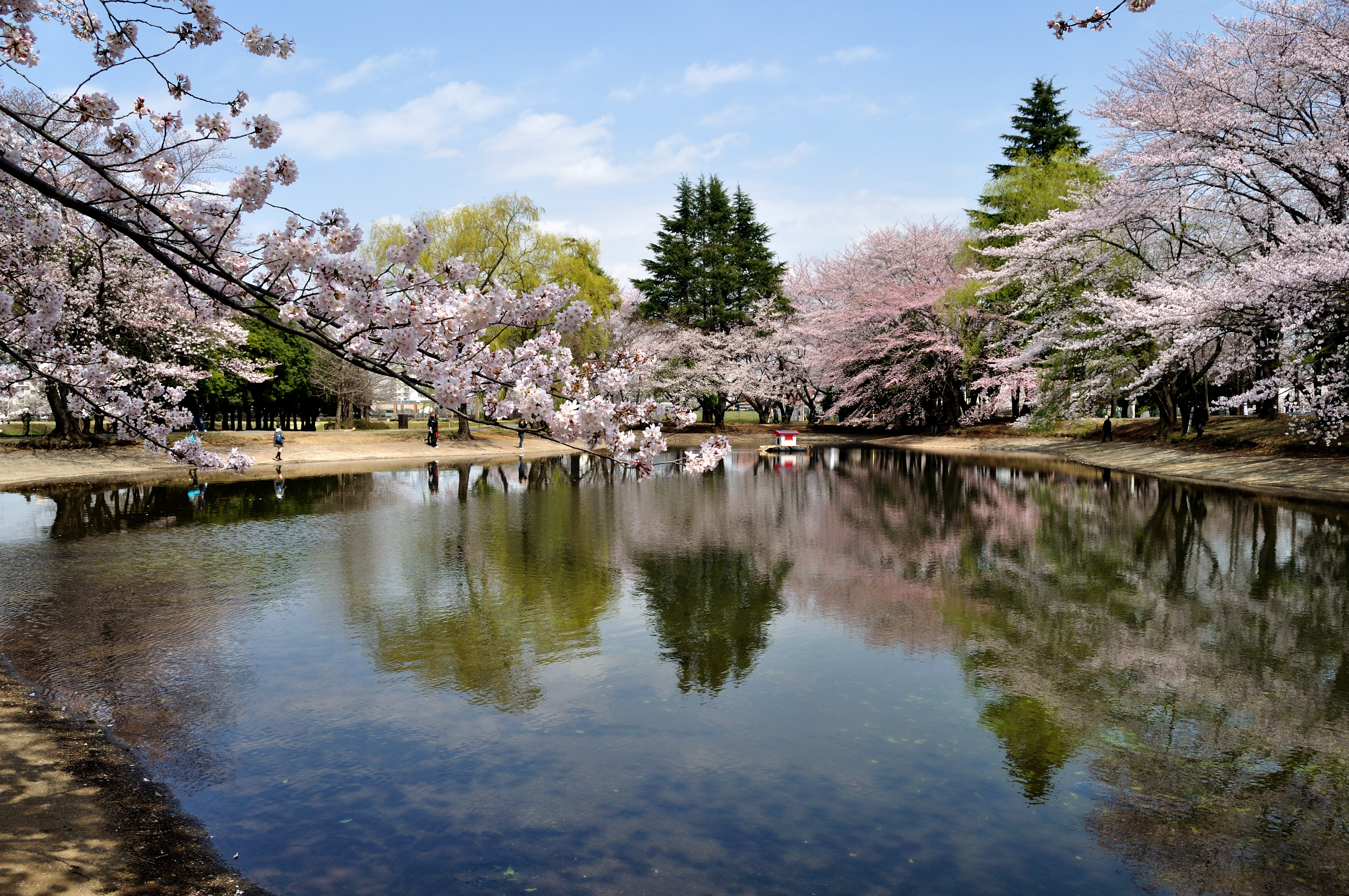
Pond at JGSDF Camp Asaka

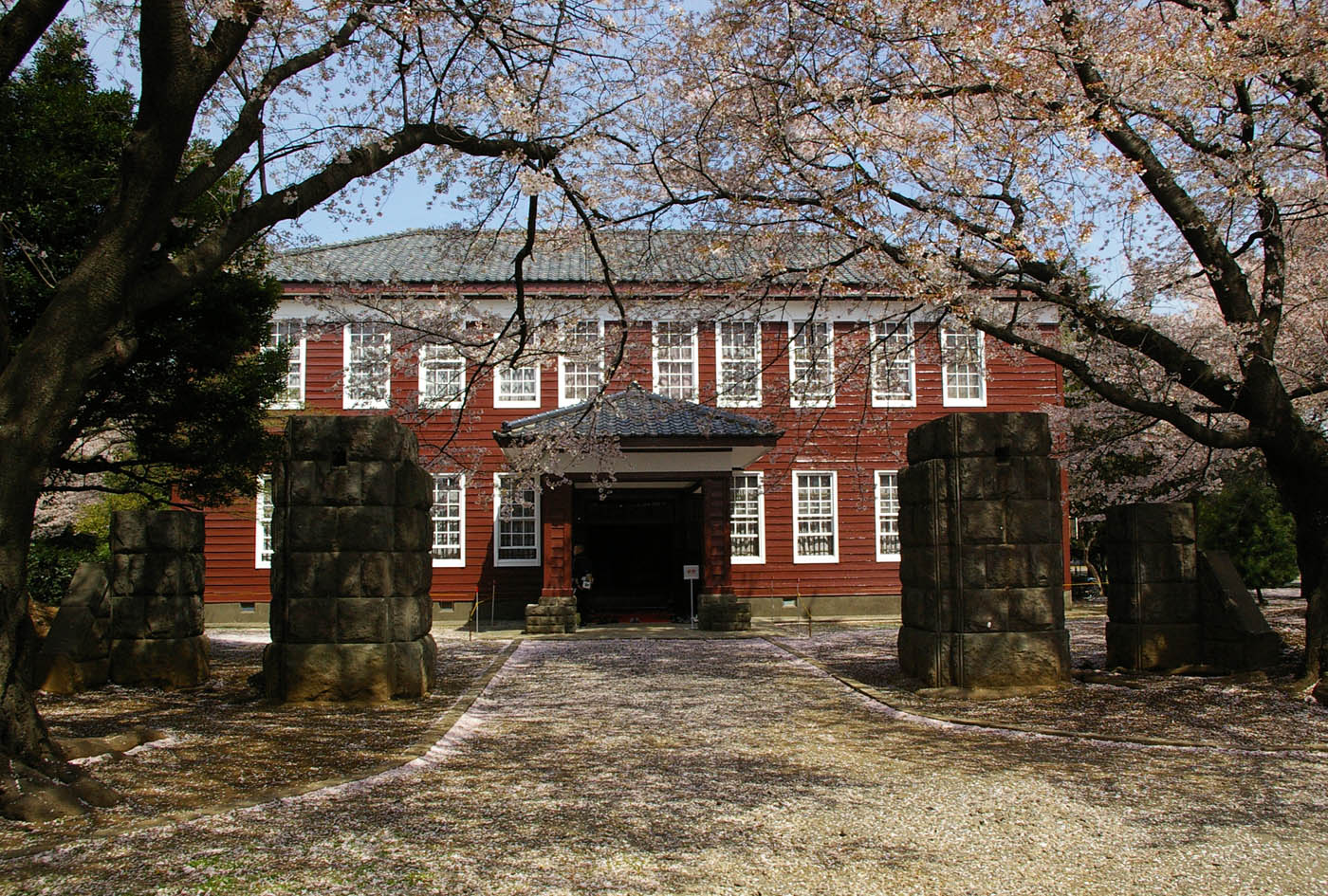
former IJA Officer Preparatory School at JGSDF Camp Asaka

Asaka (朝霞市, Asaka-shi; Japanese pronunciation: [ä̀.sä́.kä́(.ɕì)]) is a city located in Saitama Prefecture, Japan. As of 1 January 2021, the city had an estimated population of 143,195 and a population density of 7800 persons per km^{2}. The total area of the city is 18.34 square kilometres (7.08 sq mi).

== Geography ==
Located in far southern Saitama Prefecture, Asaka in the center of the Musashino Terrace on the central reaches of the Arakawa River, which runs along the city border with Saitama in the northeastern part of the city,

=== Surrounding municipalities ===
- Saitama Prefecture
  - Niiza
  - Saitama (Minami-ku, Sakura-ku)
  - Shiki
  - Toda
  - Wako
- Tokyo Metropolis
  - Nerima-ku

=== Climate ===
Asaka has a humid subtropical climate (Köppen Cfa) characterized by warm summers and cool winters with light to no snowfall. The average annual temperature in Ageo is 15.1 °C. The average annual rainfall is 1427 mm with September as the wettest month. The temperatures are highest on average in August, at around 26.8 °C, and lowest in January, at around 4.4 °C.

== Demographics ==
Per Japanese census data, the population of Asaka has grown roughly tenfold since the 1950s.

Historical population
Year	Pop.	±%
1950	14,685	—
1960	24,182	+64.7%
1970	67,938	+180.9%
1980	90,088	+32.6%
1990	103,617	+15.0%
2000	119,712	+15.5%
2010	129,691	+8.3%
2020	141,083	+8.8%

== History ==
The area of modern Asaka developed as a series of four post stations on the Kawagoe Kaidō highway from the Muromachi period onwards. During the Edo Period, the area was noted as a center for copper crafts. Following the Meiji restoration, the village of Hizaori was created within Niikura District, Saitama with the establishment of the modern municipalities system on April 1, 1889. Niikura District was abolished in 1894 and became part of Kitaadachi District. It was raised to town status on May 1, 1921, and renamed Asaka after Prince Yasuhiko Asaka who was an honorary chairman of the Tokyo Golf Club, which relocated to the area at that time. On April 1, 1955, Asaka annexed the neighboring village of Uchimagi. At the 1964 Summer Olympics in neighboring Tokyo, the town hosted the riding part of the modern pentathlon event at Asaka Nezu Park. Asaka was elevated to city status on March 15, 1967. In 2005, a proposal to merge Asaka with Shiki, Wako, and Niiza to form a new city with a combined population sufficient to qualify for core city status was defeated in a referendum, largely due to opposition from Wako.

== Government ==
Asaka has a mayor-council form of government with a directly elected mayor and a unicameral city council of 24 members. Asaka contributes two members to the Saitama Prefectural Assembly. In terms of national politics, the city is part of Saitama 4th district of the lower house of the Diet of Japan.

== Economy ==
Due to its location, Asaka is primarily a bedroom community with over 37% of its population commuting to the Tokyo metropolis for work. The area is also a distribution hub for northern Tokyo.

== Education ==
Asaka has ten public elementary schools and five public middle schools operated by the city government, and two public high schools operated by the Saitama Prefectural Board of Education. Toyo University also has a campus in Asaka.

== Transportation ==
=== Railway ===
JR East – Musashino Line

- Kita-Asaka

Tōbu Railway - Tōbu Tōjō Line

- Asaka - Asakadai

=== Highway ===
- National Route 254

== Military facilities ==
- JGSDF Camp Asaka

== In popular culture ==
The manga Monster Musume is set in Asaka.

== Noted people from Asaka ==
- Daieishō Hayato, sumo wrestler
- Akira Nakamura, professional baseball player
- Shohei Takashima, professional baseball player
- Yuhi, professional wrestler
