= Niiza Station =

Railway station in Niiza, Saitama Prefecture, Japan

JM29 Niiza Station 新座駅
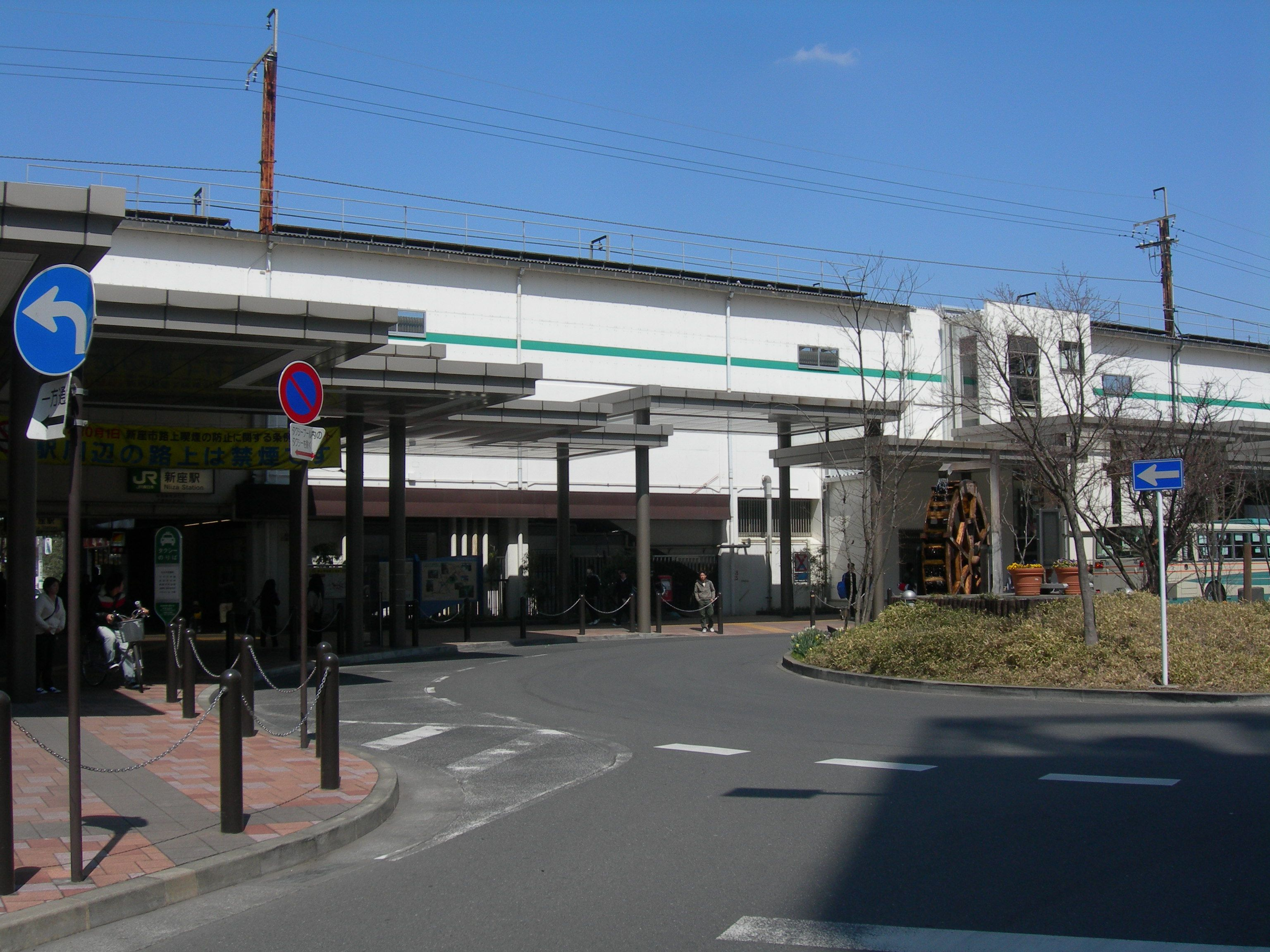
- The south side of the station in March 2009

General information
- Location: 5 Nobitome, Niiza-shi, Saitama-ken 352–0011; Japan
- Coordinates: 35°48′13.7916″N 139°33′22.9″E
- Operator: JR East
- Line: Musashino Line
- Distance: 19.7 km from Fuchūhommachi
- Platforms: 2 side platforms
- Tracks: 3
- Connections: Bus terminal

Other information
- Status: Staffed
- Station code: JM29
- Website: Official website

History
- Opened: 1 April 1973

Passengers
- FY2019: 21,213 daily

Services
Preceding station	JR East	Following station
Higashi-Tokorozawa JM30 towards Fuchūhommachi or Hachiōji	Musashino	Kita-Asaka JM28 towards Ōmiya
Higashi-Tokorozawa JM30 towards Fuchūhommachi	Musashino Line	Kita-Asaka JM28 towards Kaihimmakuhari or Tokyo
Location
- Location within Saitama Prefecture Location within Japan

Niiza Station (新座駅, Niiza-eki) is a passenger railway station located in the city of Niiza, Saitama, Japan, operated by East Japan Railway Company (JR East).

== Lines ==
Niiza Station is served by the orbital Musashino Line from Fuchūhommachi to Nishi-Funabashi and Tokyo. It is located 19.7 km (12.2 mi) from Fuchūhommachi Station.

== Station layout ==
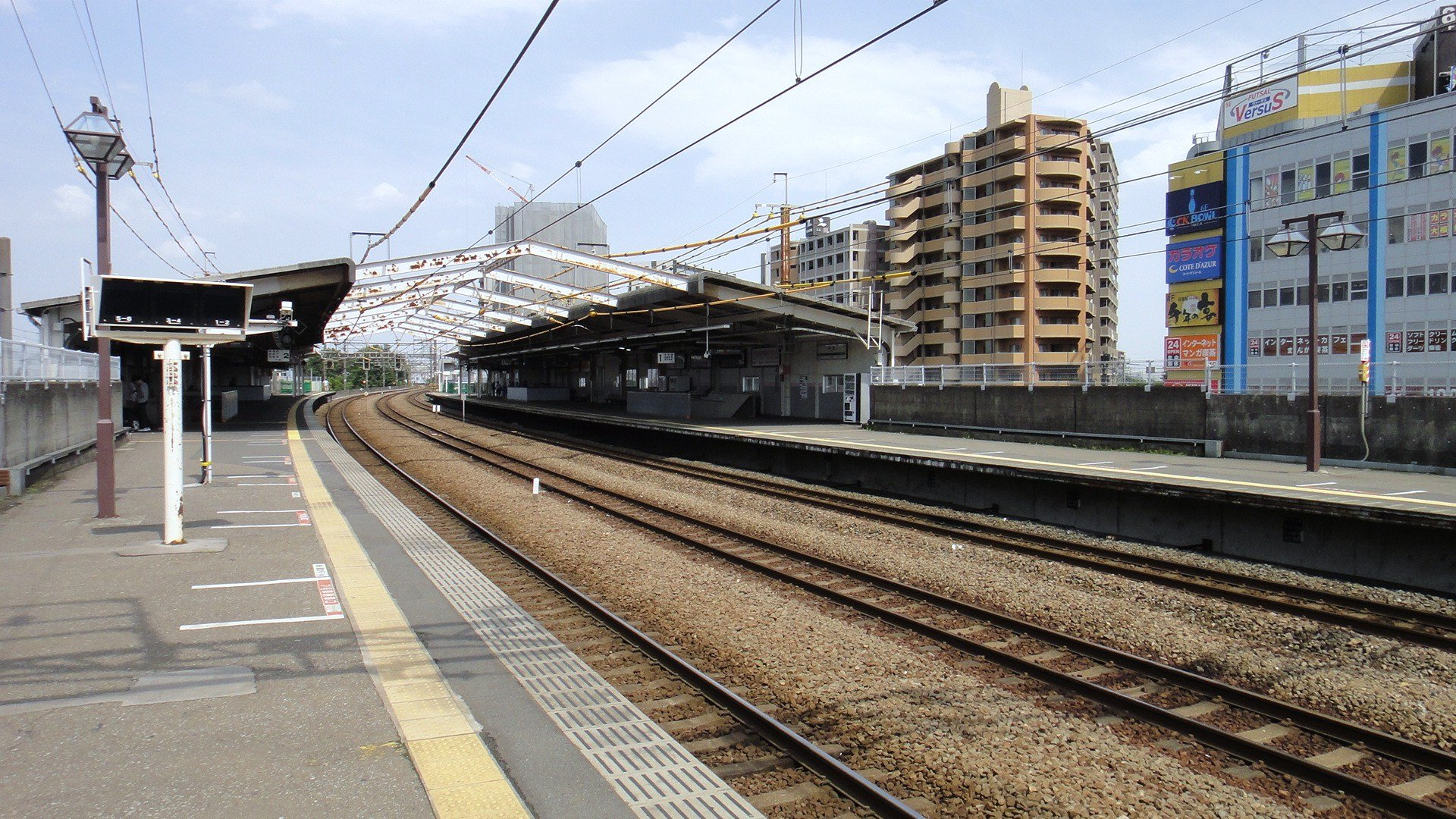
View of the platforms looking eastward from platform 2 in May 2011

The elevated station consists of two opposed side platforms serving two tracks, with the station building underneath. There is also a centre through-track for west-bound freight services accessing Niiza Freight Terminal to the west of the station. The station is staffed.

The Astro Boy theme tune is used as the departure melody.

=== Platforms ===
1	Musashino Line	for Nishi-Kokubunji and Fuchūhommachi
2	Musashino Line	for Musashi-Urawa, Shim-Matsudo, Nishi-Funabashi, Tokyo, and Kaihimmakuhari

== History ==
The station opened on 1 April 1973.

== Passenger statistics ==
In fiscal 2019, the station was used by an average of 21,213 passengers daily (boarding passengers only).

== Surrounding area ==
- Atomi University
- Jumonji University
- Rikkyo University Niiza Campus
- Rikkyo Niiza High School
- Niiza Freight Terminal (JR Freight)
- National Route 254
- National Route 463

== See also ==
- List of railway stations in Japan
