= Asakadai Station =

Railway station in Asaka, Saitama Prefecture, Japan

TJ13 Asakadai Station 朝霞台駅
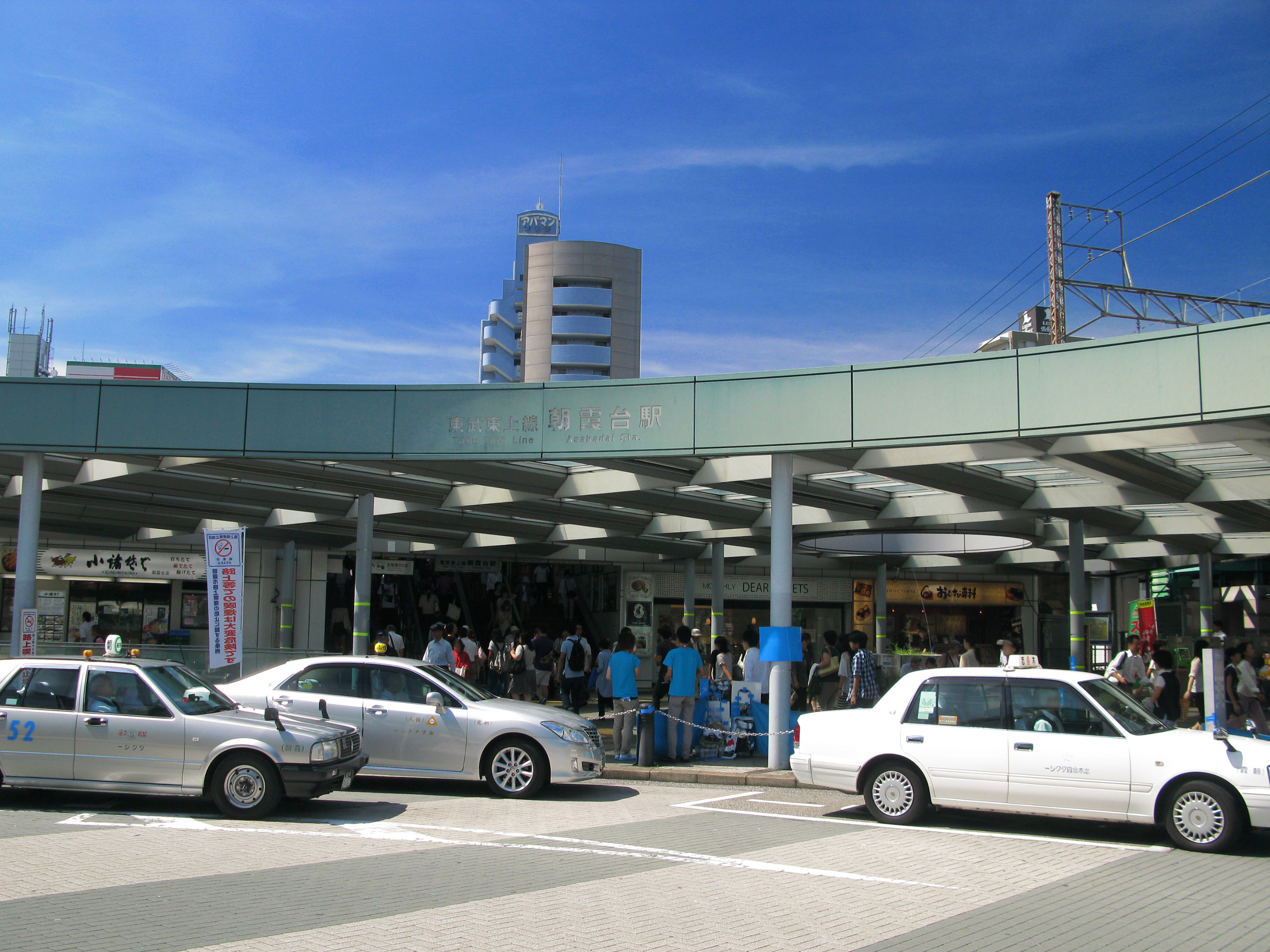
- The north entrance in September 2012

General information
- Location: 1-4-17 Higashi-benzai, Asaka-shi, Saitama-ken 351-0022; Japan
- Coordinates: 35.8143°N 139.5872°E
- Operator: Tōbu Railway
- Line: Tōbu Tōjō Line
- Distance: 16.4 km from Ikebukuro
- Platforms: 2 island platforms
- Tracks: 4
- Connections: Kita-Asaka Station (Musashino Line); Bus terminal

Construction
- Structure type: At-grade
- Accessible: Yes

Other information
- Status: Staffed
- Station code: TJ-13
- Website: Official website

History
- Opened: 6 August 1974

Passengers
- FY2019: 161,762 daily

Services
Preceding station	Tobu Railway	Following station
Kawagoe TJ21 towards Ogawamachi	Kawagoe	Ikebukuro TJ01 Terminus
Kawagoe TJ21 towards Ogawamachi	F Liner	Wakōshi TJ11 towards Motomachi-Chūkagai
Kawagoe TJ21 towards Yorii	Tojo Line Rapid Express	Wakōshi TJ11 towards Ikebukuro
Shiki TJ14 towards Yorii	Tojo Line Express Semi Express Local	Asaka TJ12 towards Ikebukuro
Location
- Location within Saitama Prefecture Location within Japan

Asakadai Station (朝霞台駅, Asakadai-eki) is a passenger railway station located in the city of Asaka, Saitama, Japan, operated by the private railway operator Tōbu Railway.

== Lines ==
The station is served by the Tōbu Tōjō Line from Ikebukuro in Tokyo, with some services inter-running via the Tokyo Metro Yurakucho Line to Shin-Kiba and the Tokyo Metro Fukutoshin Line to Shibuya and onward via the Tokyu Toyoko Line and Minato Mirai Line to Motomachi-Chūkagai. Located between Asaka and Shiki stations, it is 16.4 km from the Tōbu Tōjō Line terminus at Ikebukuro. Rapid Express, Express, Semi express, and Local services stop at this station.

The station is adjacent and at right angles to Kita-Asaka Station on the Musashino Line operated by JR East.

== Station layout ==
The station is composed of two island platforms serving four tracks. The station building is located above the platforms, which are situated in a cutting.

=== Platforms ===
1/2	Tōbu Tōjō Line	for Shiki, Kawagoe, Shinrin-kōen, and Ogawamachi
3/4	Tōbu Tōjō Line	for Wakōshi, Narimasu, and Ikebukuro; Tokyo Metro Yurakucho Line for Shin-Kiba; Tokyo Metro Fukutoshin Line for Shibuya; Tōkyū Tōyoko Line for Yokohama; Tōkyū Shin-Yokohama Line for Shin-Yokohama via Sōtetsu Shin-Yokohama Line for Ebina and Shōnandai; Minatomirai Line for Motomachi-Chūkagai

Rapid Express, Express, and Semi-Express trains usually use platforms 1 and 4 in their respective directions. Local trains usually use platforms 2 and 3 in their respective directions.

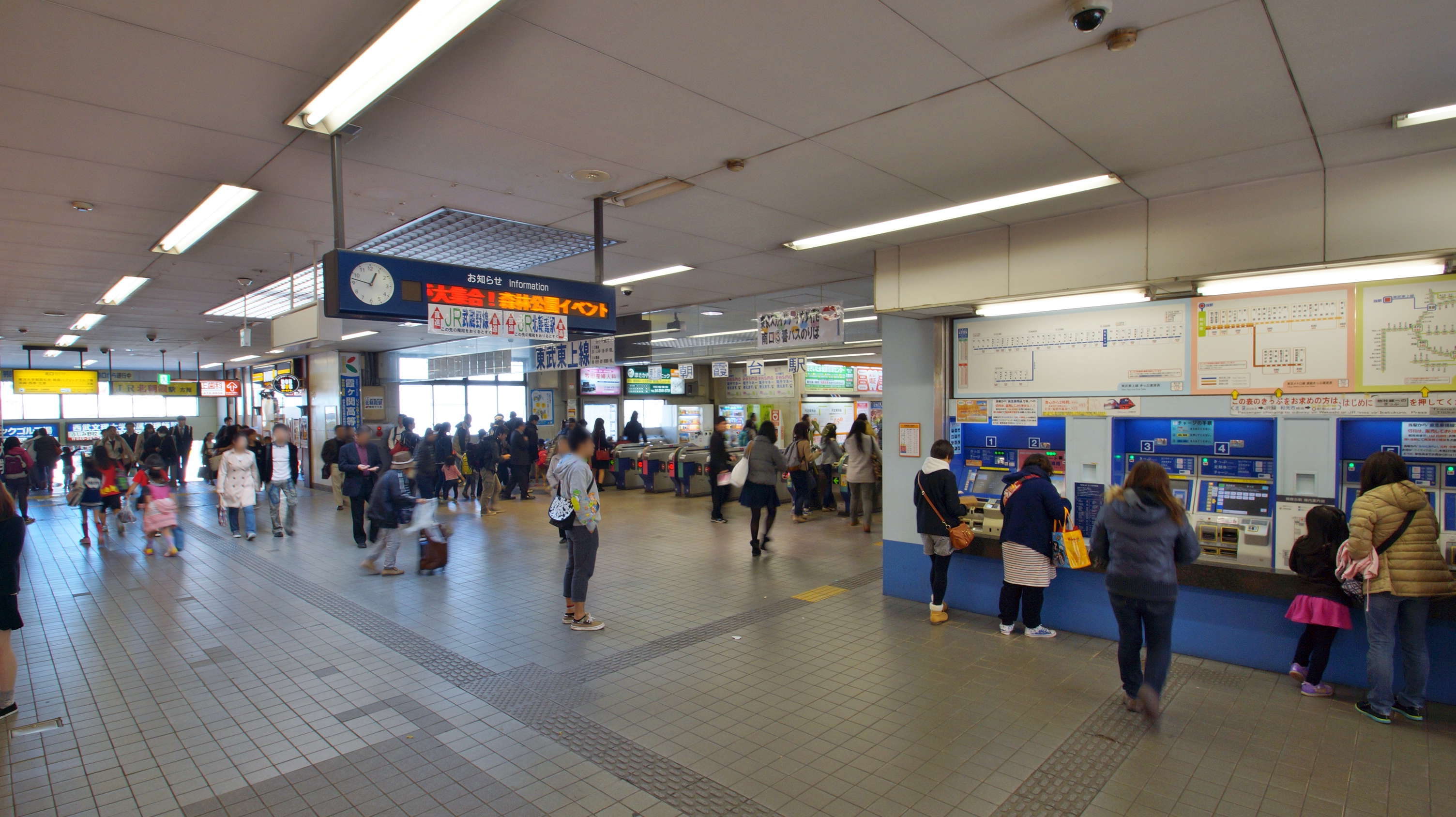
The ticket vending machines and ticket barriers in November 2014

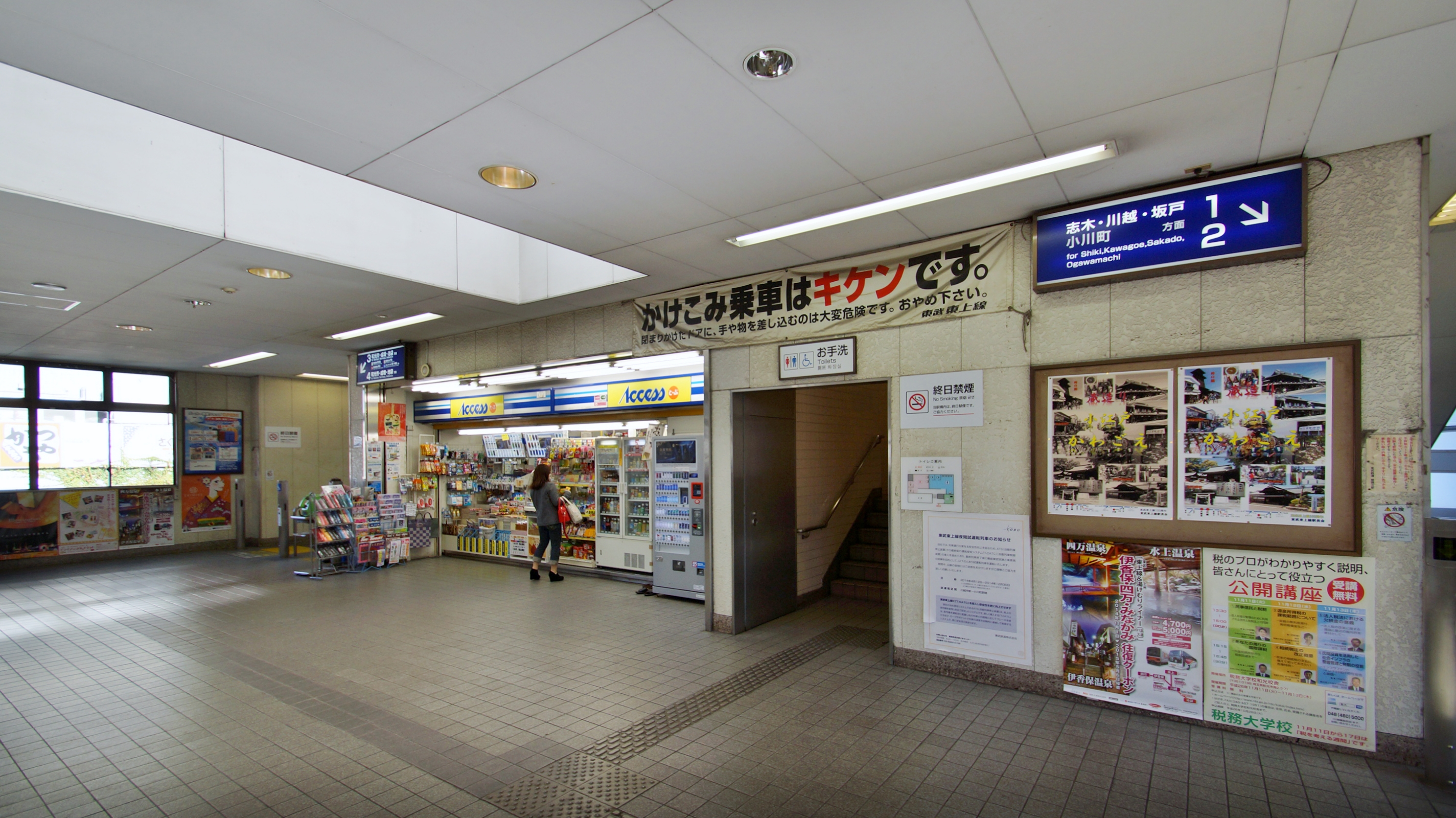
The station kiosk and toilets inside the ticket barriers in November 2014

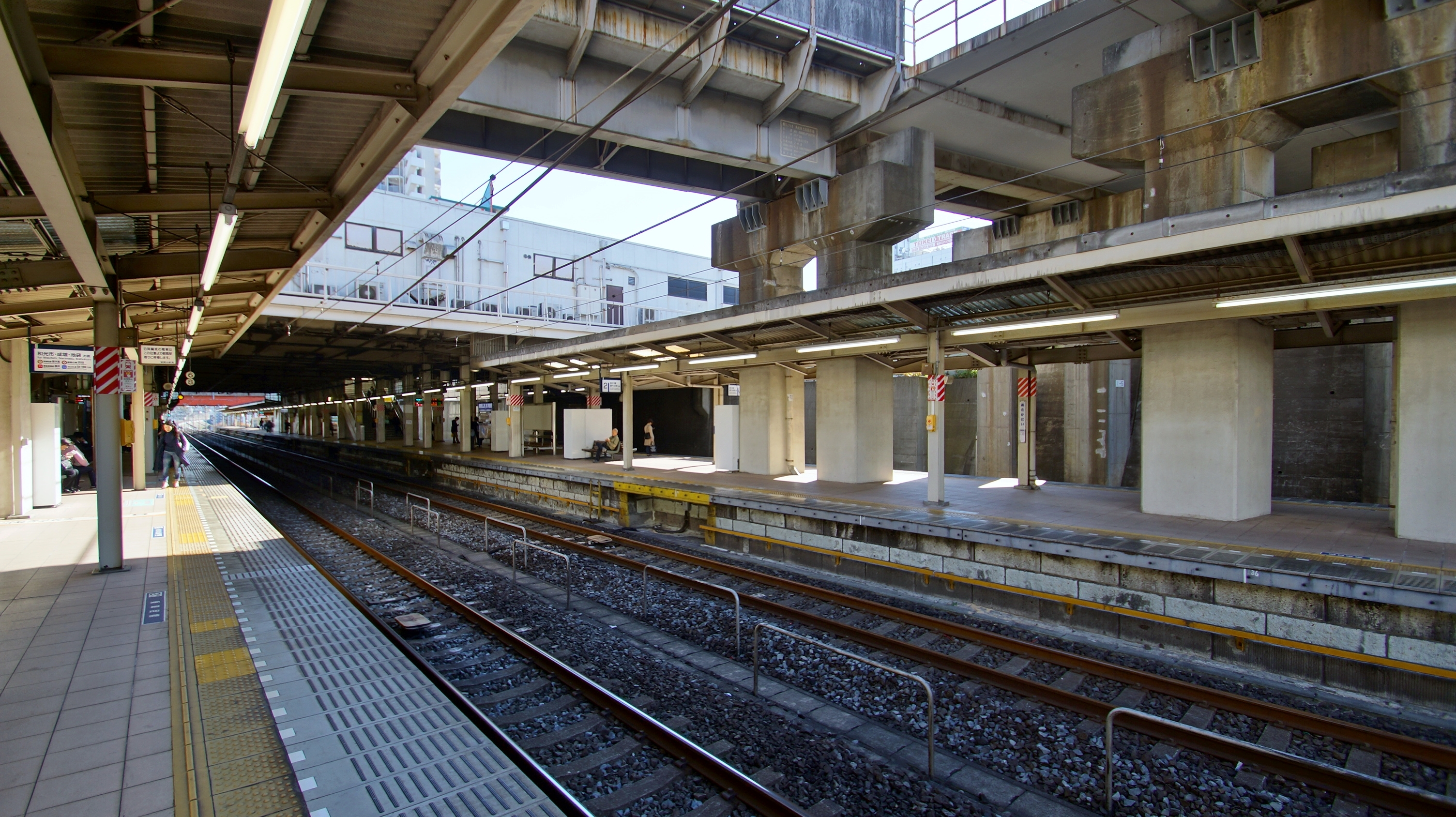
The north end of the platforms in November 2014

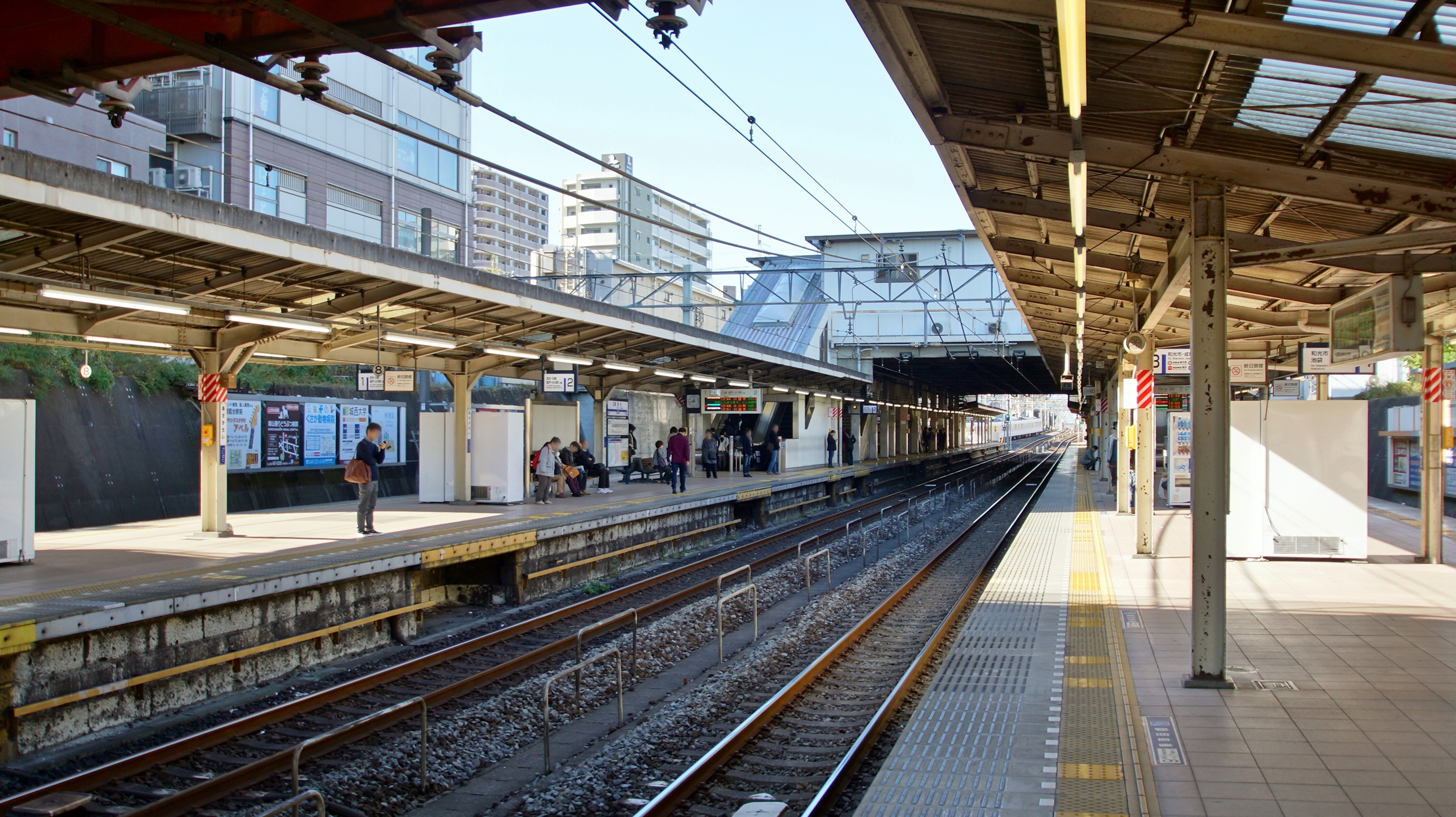
The south end of the platforms in November 2014

== History ==
The station opened on 6 August 1974.

Through-running to and from Shibuya via the Tokyo Metro Fukutoshin Line commenced on 14 June 2008.

From 17 March 2012, station numbering was introduced on the Tōbu Tōjō Line, with Asakadai Station becoming "TJ-13".

Through-running to and from Yokohama and Motomachi-Chukagai via the Tokyu Toyoko Line and Minatomirai Line commenced on 16 March 2013.

From March 2023, Asakadai Station became a Rapid Express service stop following the abolishment of the Rapid (快速, Kaisoku) services and reorganization of the Tōbu Tōjō Line services. In addition, through service via the Tōkyū Shin-yokohama Line, Sōtetsu Shin-yokohama Line, Sōtetsu Main Line, and Sōtetsu Izumino Line to Shin-Yokohama, Ebina, and Shōnandai commenced.

== Passenger statistics ==
In fiscal 2019, the station was used by an average of 161,762 passengers daily.

Passenger figures for previous years (boarding passengers only) are as shown below.

Fiscal year	Daily average
1980	24,549
1990	46,495
2000	61,429
2010	72,610
2015	79,109

== Surrounding area ==
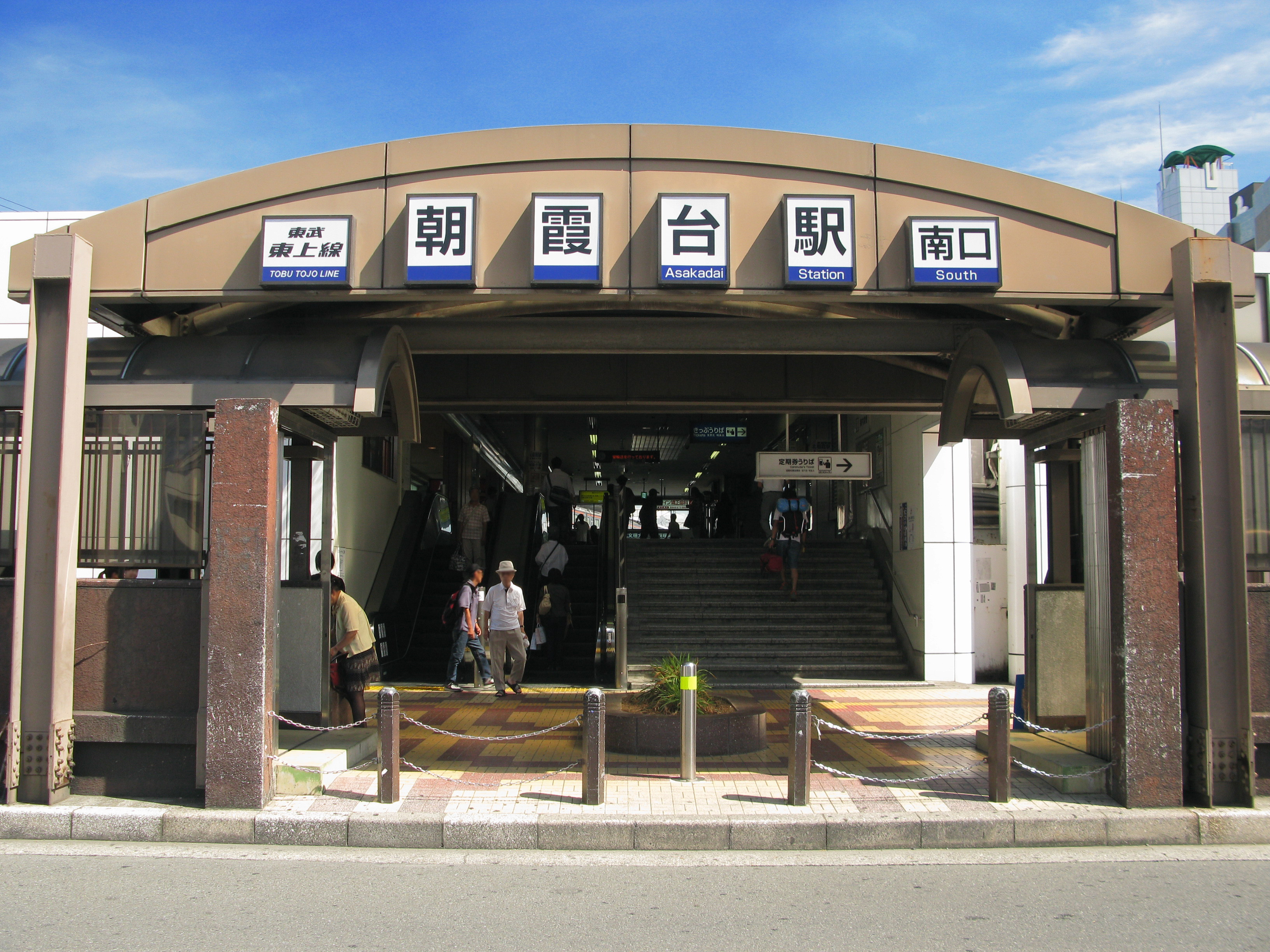
The south entrance in September 2012

- Kita-Asaka Station (JR Musashino Line)
- Toyo University Asaka Campus

== Bus services ==
From 17 July 2008, there is a direct express bus service to/from Narita Airport. The bus stop is on the south side of the station.

== See also ==
- List of railway stations in Japan
