= Kita-Asaka Station =

Railway station in Asaka, Saitama Prefecture, Japan

JM28 Kita-Asaka Station 北朝霞駅
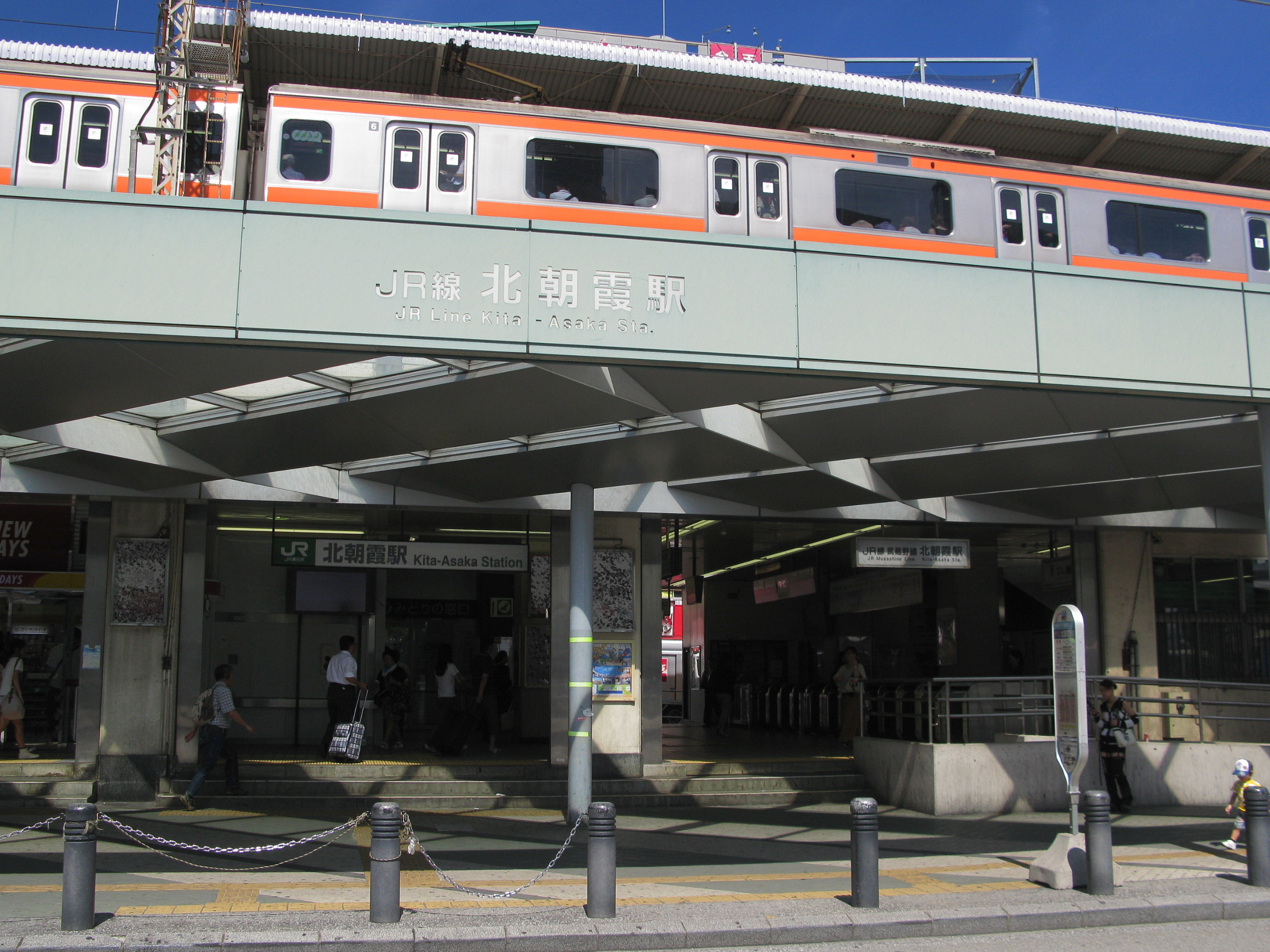
- The south entrance in September 2012

General information
- Location: 1-1-11 Hamazaki, Asaka-shi, Saitama-ken 351-0033; Japan
- Coordinates: 35.8153°N 139.5875°E
- Operator: JR East
- Line: Musashino Line
- Distance: 22.8 km from Fuchūhommachi
- Platforms: 1 island platform
- Tracks: 2
- Connections: Asakadai Station (Tobu Tojo Line); Bus terminal

Other information
- Status: Staffed (Midori no Madoguchi)
- Station code: JM28
- Website: Official website

History
- Opened: 1 April 1973

Passengers
- FY2019: 70,577 daily

Services
Preceding station	JR East	Following station
Niiza JM29 towards Fuchūhommachi or Hachiōji	Musashino	Ōmiya Terminus
Niiza JM29 towards Fuchūhommachi	Musashino Line	Nishi-Urawa JM27 towards Kaihimmakuhari or Tokyo
Location
- Location within Saitama Prefecture Location within Japan

Kita-Asaka Station (北朝霞駅, Kita-Asaka-eki) is a passenger railway station located in the city of Asaka, Saitama, Japan, operated by East Japan Railway Company (JR East).

== Lines ==
Kita-Asaka Station is served by the orbital Musashino Line from Fuchūhommachi to Nishi-Funabashi and Tokyo. It is located adjacent and at right angles to Asakadai Station on the Tobu Tojo Line to Ikebukuro in Tokyo. The station is located 22.8 kilometers from Fuchūhommachi Station.

== Station layout ==
The station consists of an elevated island platform serving two tracks. The station has a Midori no Madoguchi staffed ticket office. The station has toilet facilities located on the mezzanine level, and both escalator and lift access from the ground level entrance to the elevated platform. Universal access toilets are located outside the station.

=== Platforms ===
1	Musashino Line	for Nishi-Kokubunji and Fuchūhommachi
2	Musashino Line	for Musashi-Urawa, Shim-Matsudo, Nishi-Funabashi, Tokyo, and Kaihimmakuhari

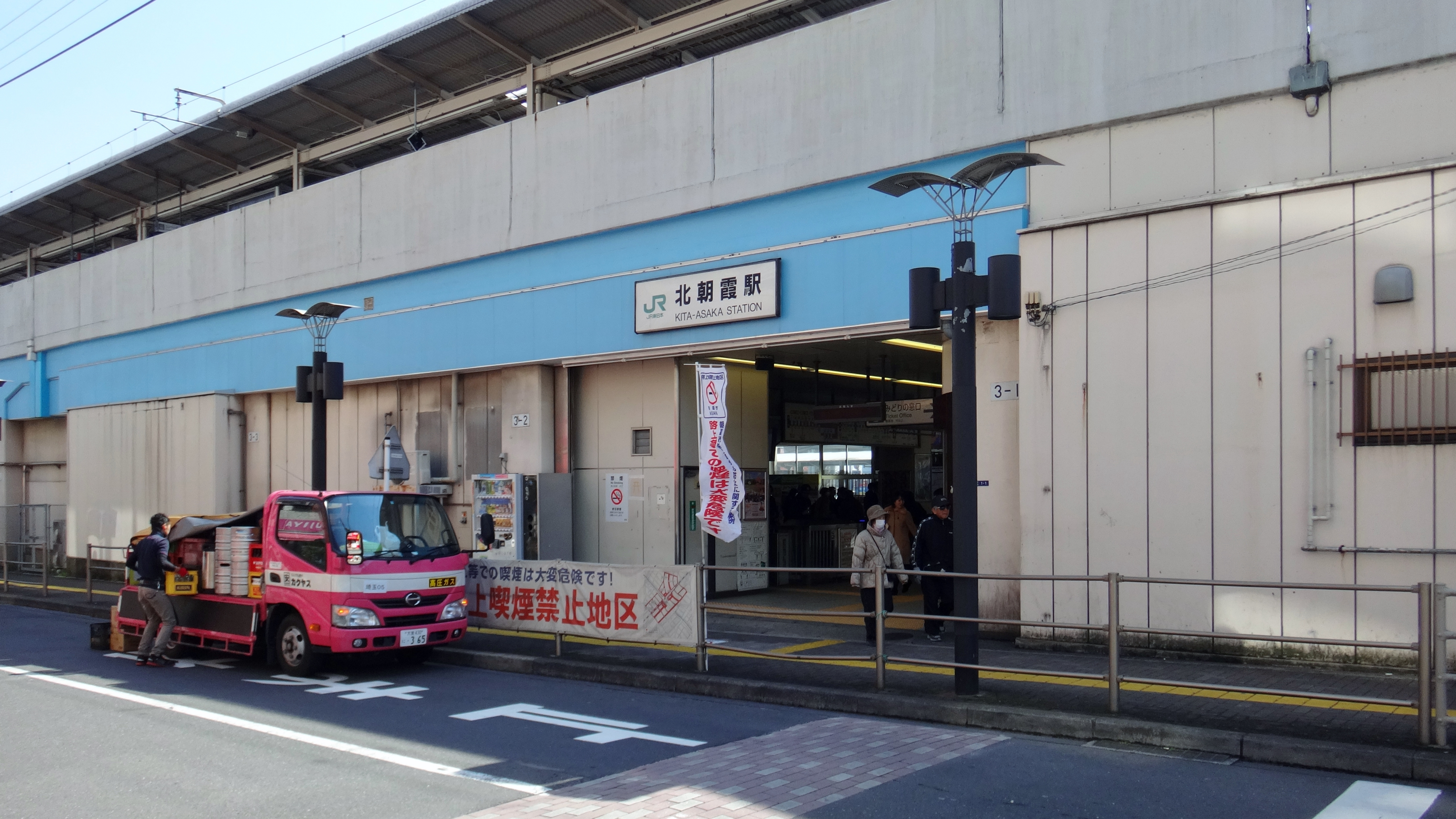
The north entrance in March 2016

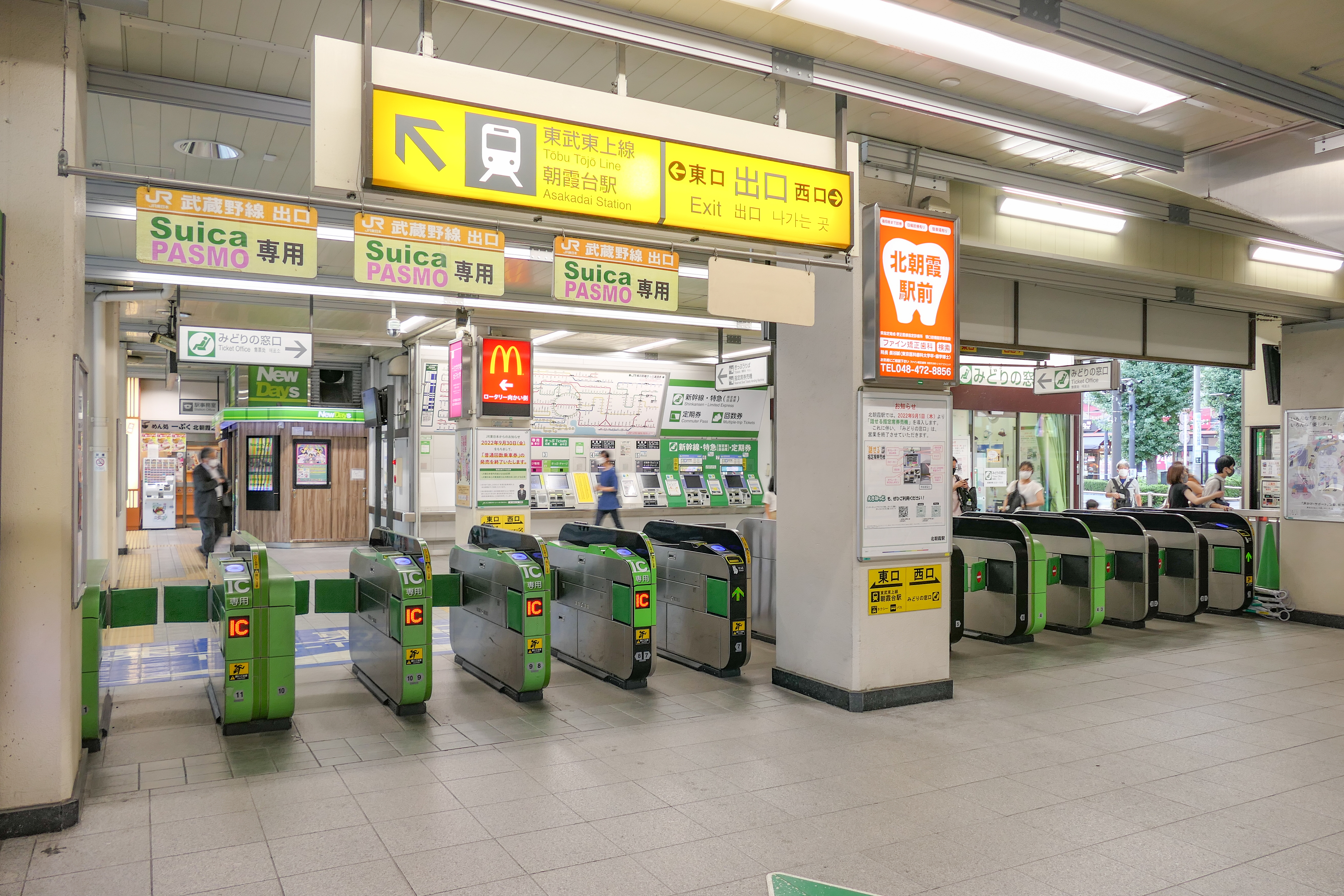
The ticket barriers in August 2022

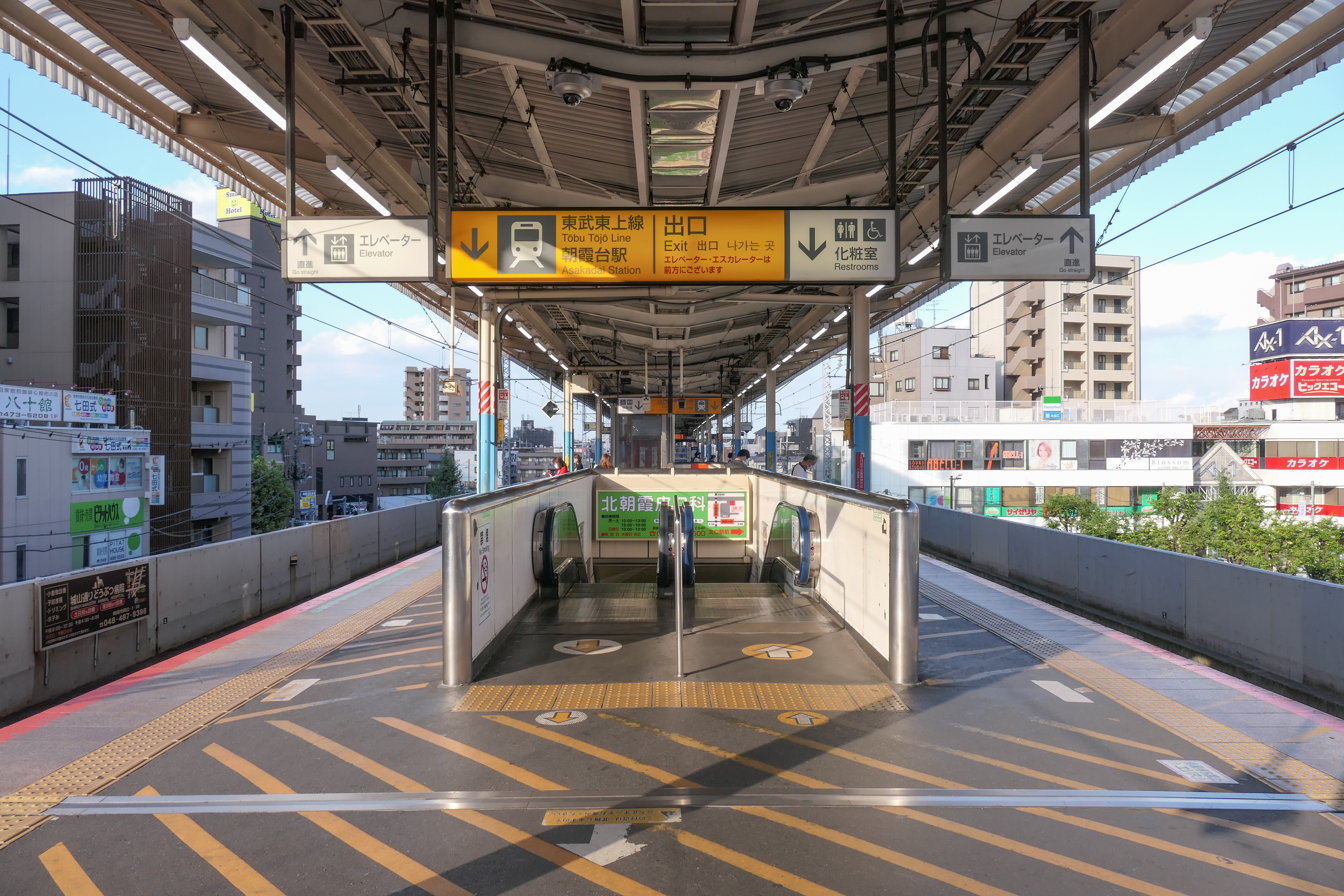
The platform in August 2022

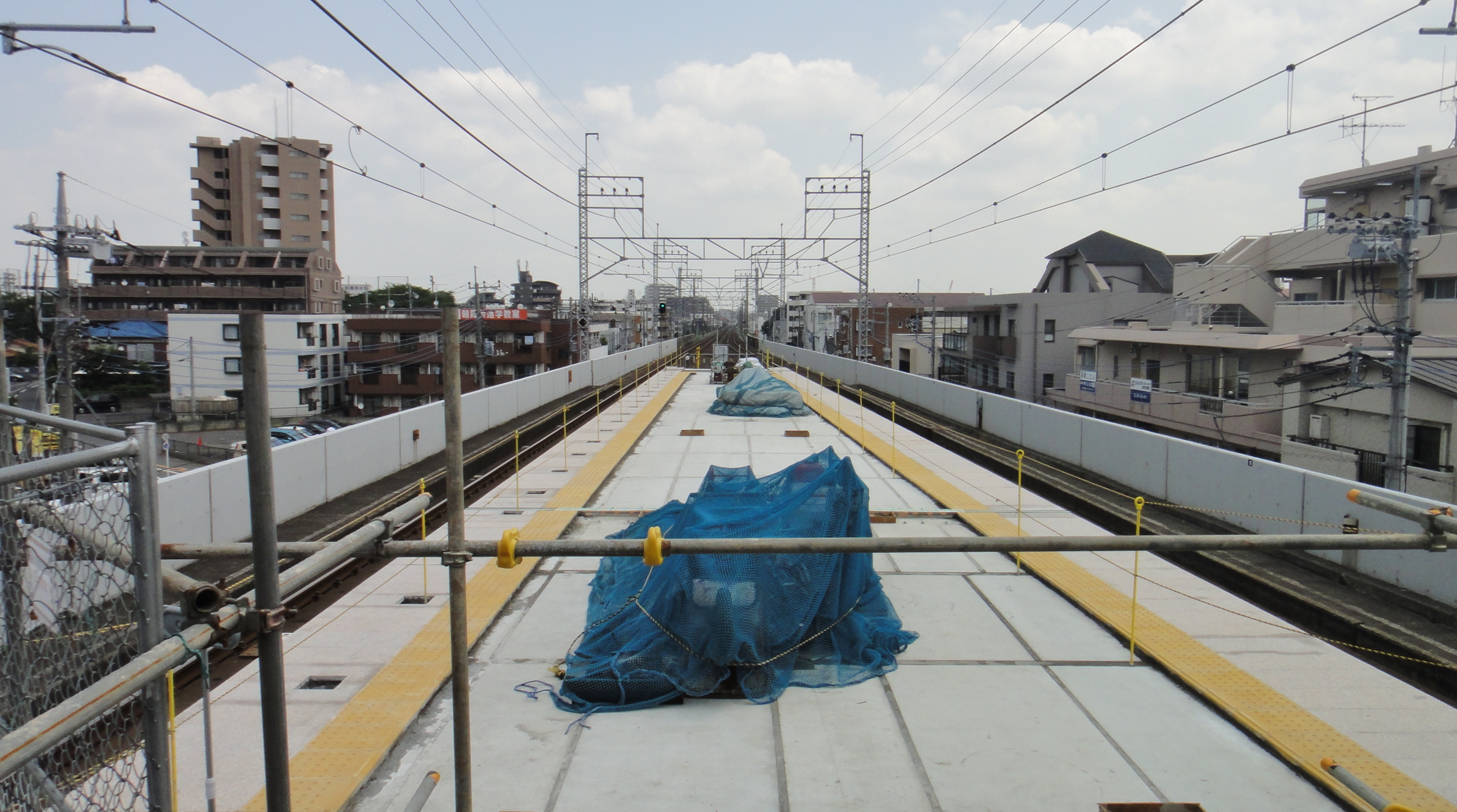
The 2-car-length platform extension under construction in July 2014

== History ==
The station opened on 1 April 1973. With the privatization of JNR on 1 April 1987, the station came under the control of JR East.

In April 2014, work started to extend the platform by approximately 40 m (130 ft) to the east (toward Nishi-Urawa) to allow the train stopping positions to be offset by two car lengths on either side and alleviate crowding on the platform during busy periods. Costing approximately 200 million yen, work was scheduled to be completed around December 2014.

== Passenger statistics ==
In fiscal 2019, the station was used by an average of 70,577 passengers daily (boarding passengers only), making it the third busiest station on the Musashino Line after Nishi-Funabashi and Minami-Koshigaya. The passenger figures (boarding passengers only) for previous years are as shown below.

Fiscal year	Daily average
2000	53,524
2001	54,907
2002	55,897
2003	57,581
2004	58,429
2005	56,832
2006	58,114
2007	59,899
2008	60,855
2009	61,912
2010	62,958
2011	63,263
2012	65,178
2013	67,382
2014	66,972

== Surrounding area ==
- Asakadai Station (on the Tobu Tojo Line)
- Toyo University Asaka Campus
- Asaka Municipal Museum
- Kita-Asaka Community Centre
- Asakadai Central General Hospital
- Asaka No. 2 Junior High School
- City Inn Kita Asaka

== Bus services ==
Buses from in front of the station are operated by Tobu Bus, Kokusai Kogyo (KKJ), as well as "Wakuwaku" community bus services operated by the city of Asaka.

== See also ==
- List of railway stations in Japan
