= Higashi-Tokorozawa Station =

Railway station in Tokorozawa, Saitama Prefecture, Japan

JM30 Higashi-Tokorozawa Station 東所沢駅
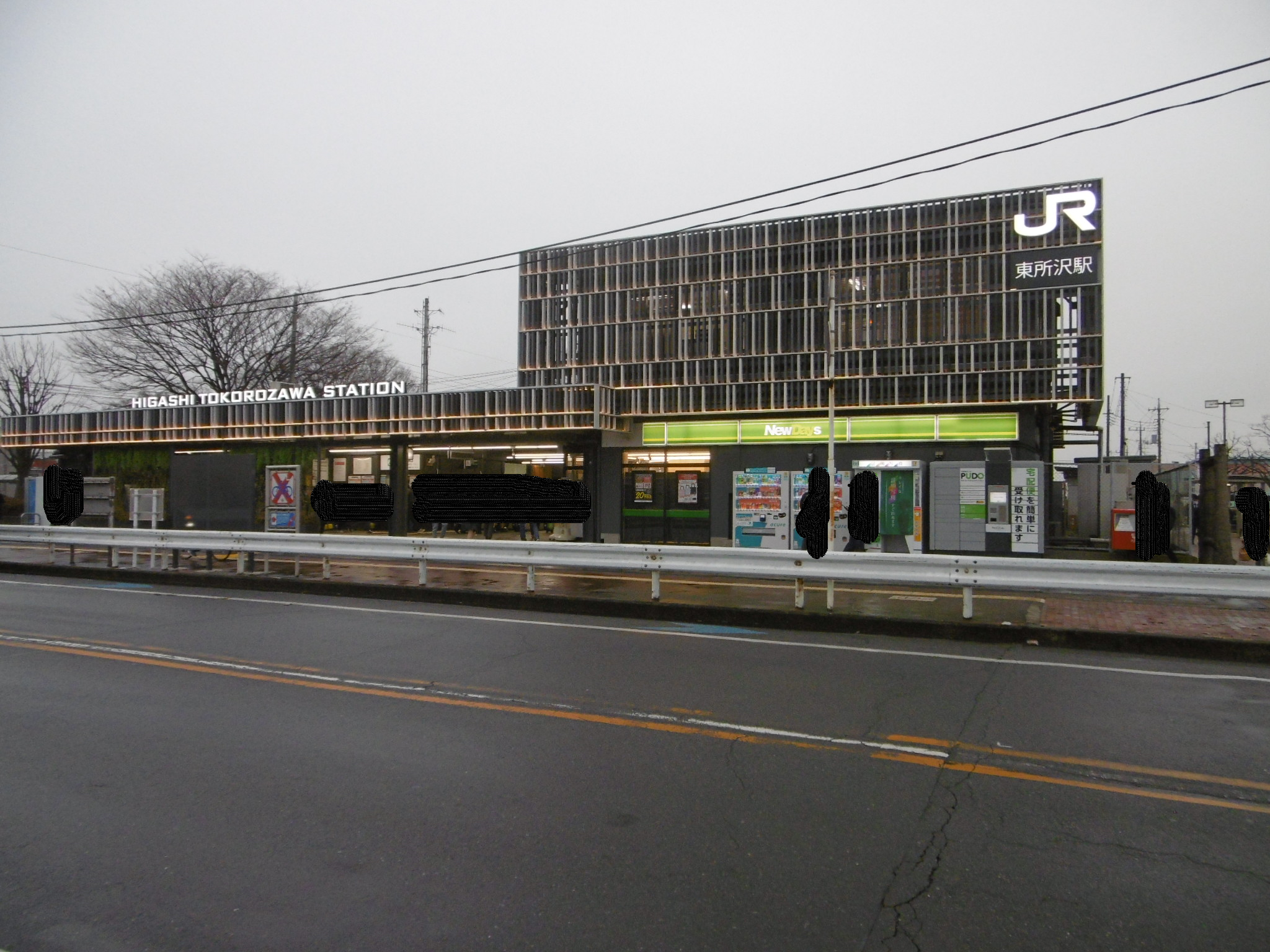
- Station front, February 2021

General information
- Location: 5-21 Higashi-Tokorozawa, Tokorozawa-shi, Saitama-ken 359–0021; Japan
- Coordinates: 35.7948°N 139.5146°E
- Operator: JR East
- Line: ■ Musashino Line
- Distance: 15.7 km from Fuchūhommachi
- Platforms: 2 island platforms

Other information
- Status: Staffed (Midori no Madoguchi )
- Website: Official website

History
- Opened: 1 April 1973

Passengers
- FY2019: 15,088 daily

Services
Preceding station	JR East	Following station
Shin-Akitsu JM31 towards Fuchūhommachi or Hachiōji	Musashino	Niiza JM29 towards Ōmiya
Shin-Akitsu JM31 towards Fuchūhommachi	Musashino Line	Niiza JM29 towards Kaihimmakuhari or Tokyo
Location
- Location within Saitama Prefecture Location within Japan

Higashi-Tokorozawa Station (東所沢駅, Higashi-Tokorozawa-eki) is a passenger railway station located in the city of Tokorozawa, Saitama, Japan, operated by East Japan Railway Company (JR East).

== Lines ==
Higashi-Tokorozawa Station is served by the orbital Musashino Line from Fuchūhommachi to Nishi-Funabashi and Tokyo. It is located 15.7 kilometers from Fuchūhommachi Station.

== Station layout ==
The station consists of two island platforms serving four tracks, located one level below ground level, with the station building above. To the east of the station lies Higashi-Tokorozawa Depot, which has 20 storage tracks.

The station has a Midori no Madoguchi staffed ticket office.

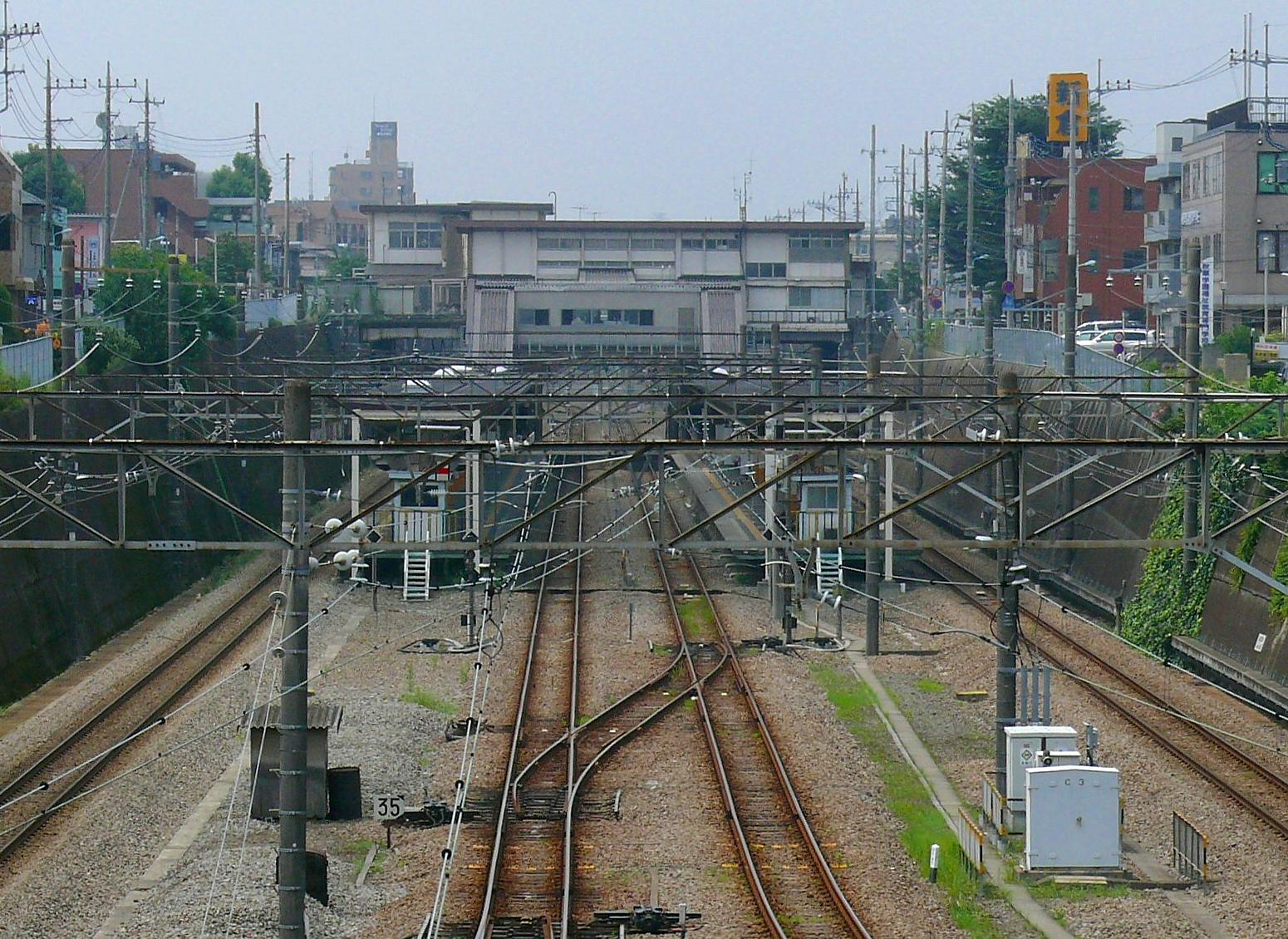
Overview of the station from the east side, July 2008

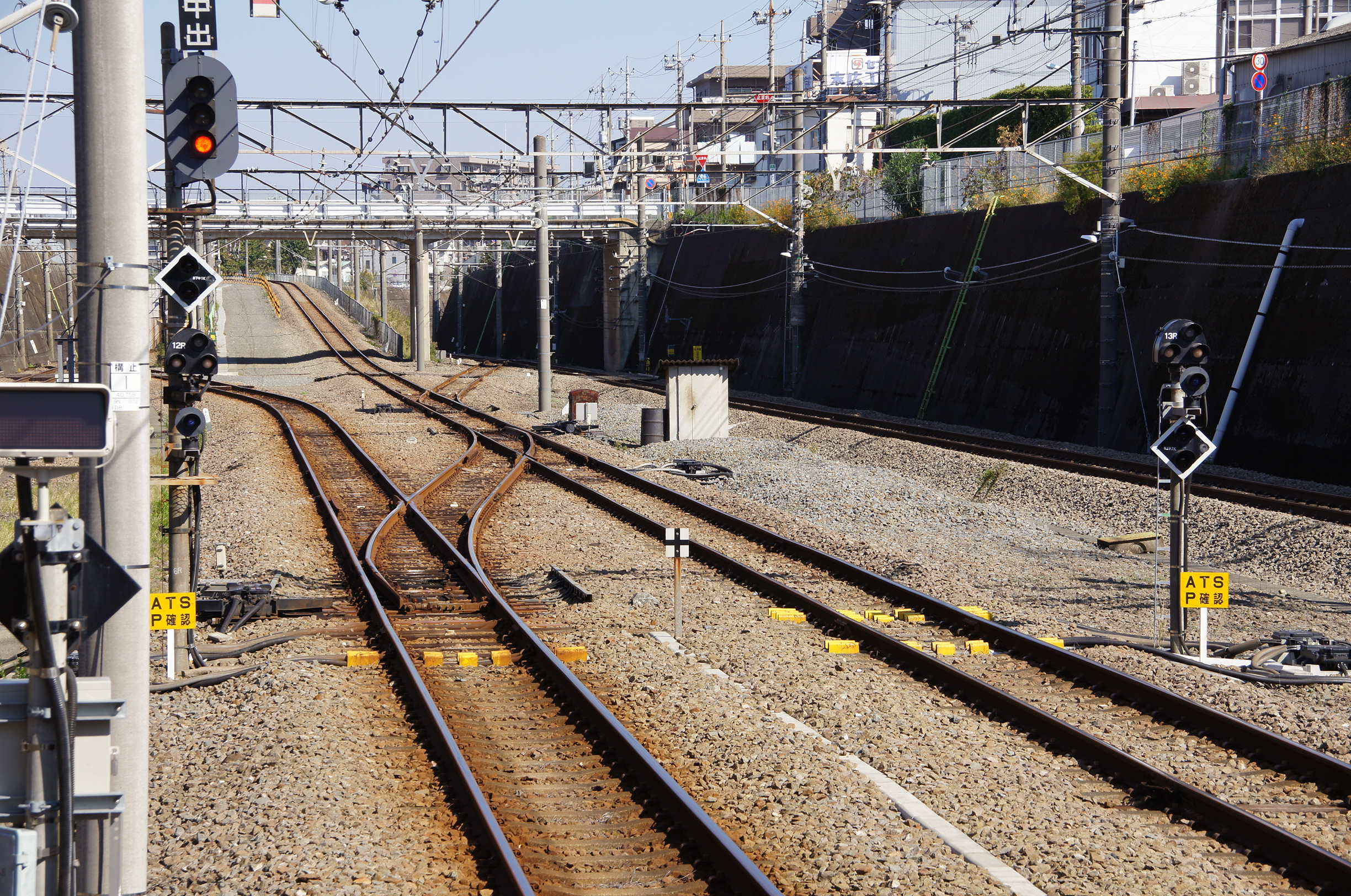
View from the station looking west showing the spur leading to Higashi-Tokorozawa Depot, October 2012

=== Platforms ===
1,2	Musashino Line	for Nishi-Kokubunji and Fuchūhommachi
3,4	Musashino Line	for Musashi-Urawa, Shim-Matsudo, Nishi-Funabashi, Tokyo, and Kaihimmakuhari

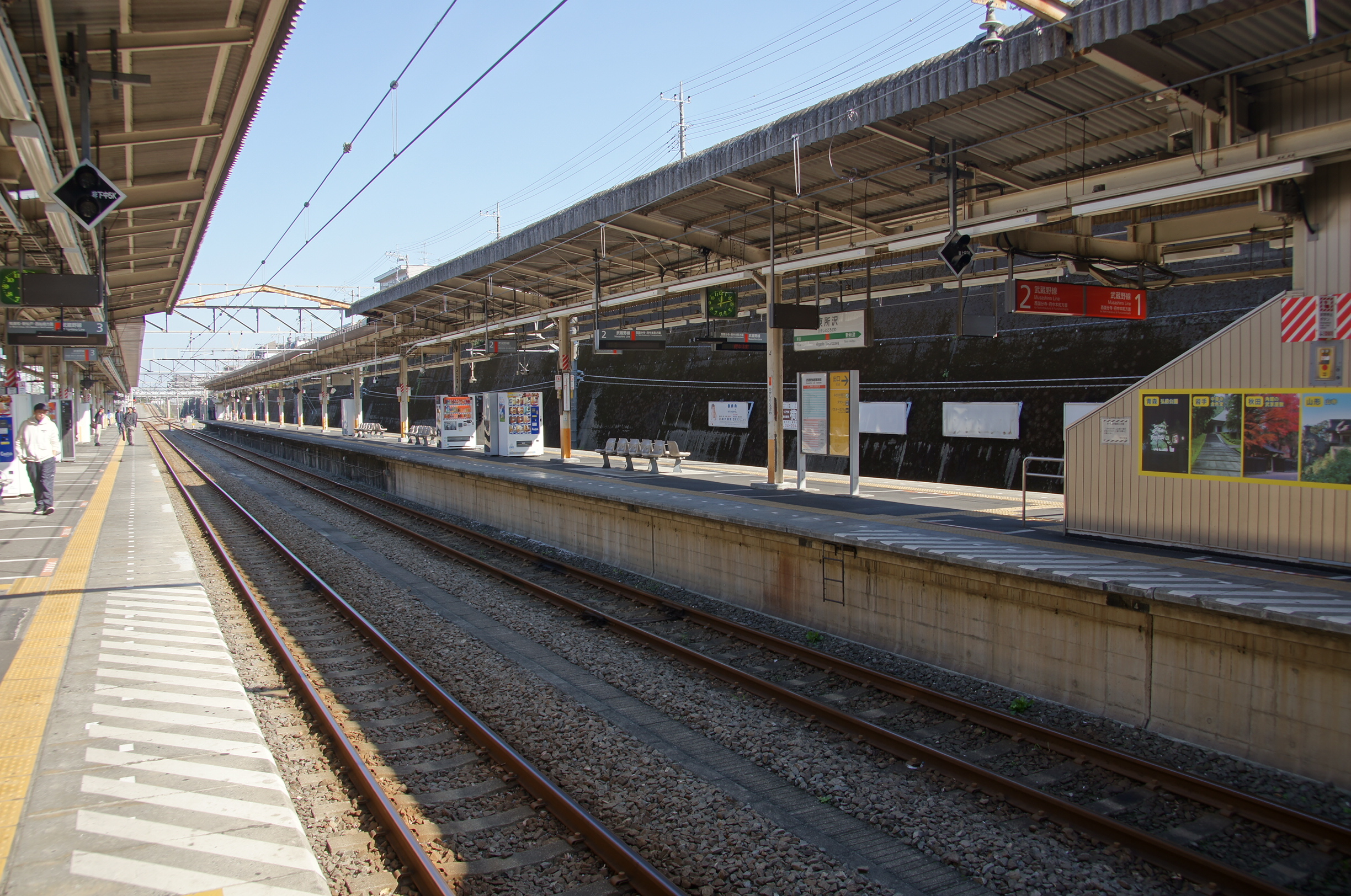
View from the west end of platforms 3 & 4, October 2012

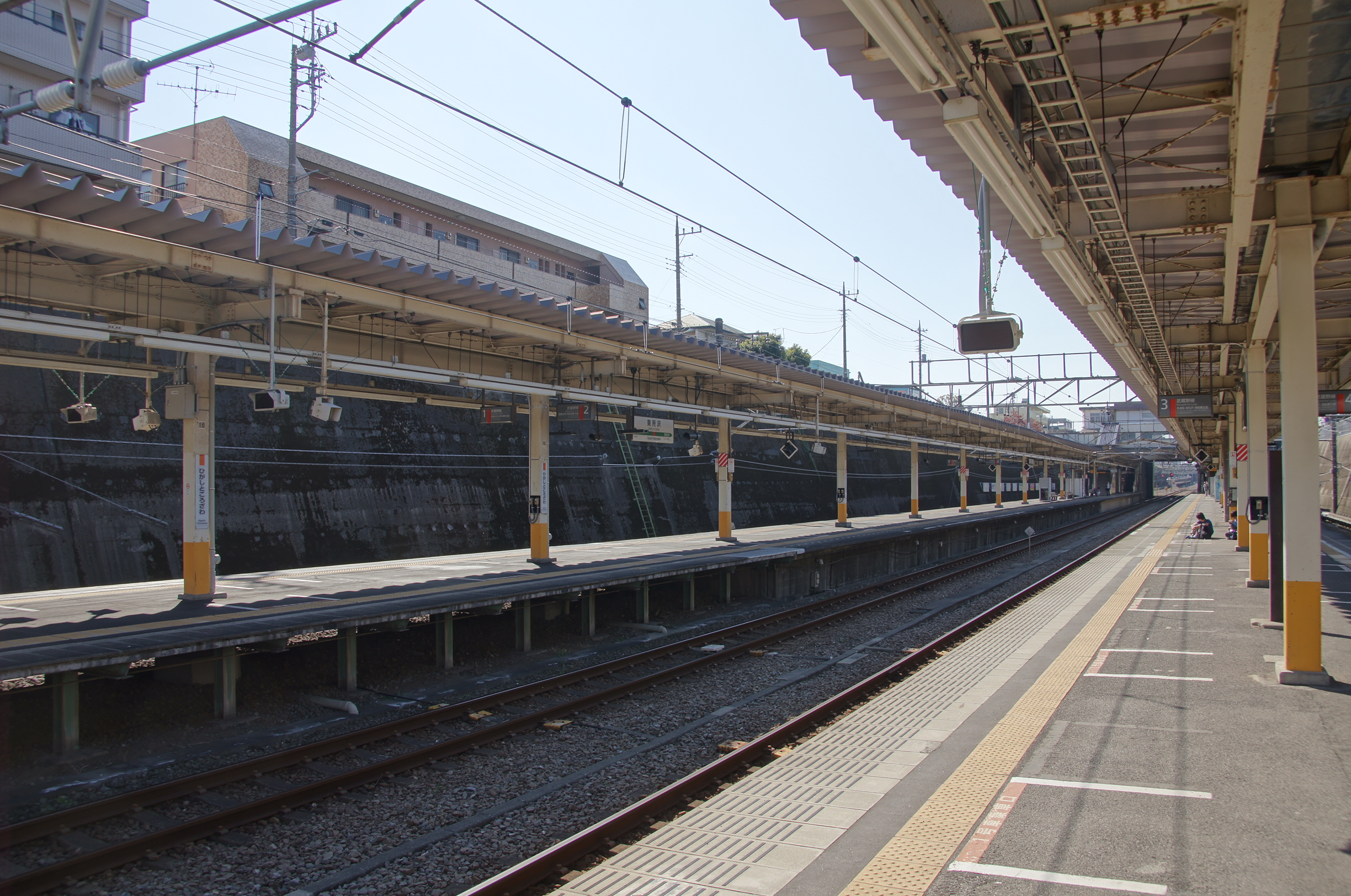
View from the east end of platforms 3 & 4, October 2012

== History ==
The station opened on 1 April 1973.

== Passenger statistics ==
In fiscal 2019, the station was used by an average of 15,088 passengers daily (boarding passengers only).

The passenger figures for previous years are as shown below.

Fiscal year	Daily average
2000	12,726
2005	13,847
2010	14,483
2015	15,322

== Surrounding area ==
- Shukutoku University Mizuhodai Campus
- Higashi-Tokorozawa Park
- Higashi-Tokorozawa Depot (JR East)
- Tokorozawa Sakura Town

== See also ==
- List of railway stations in Japan
