= Shohei Takashima =

Japanese baseball player (born 1990)

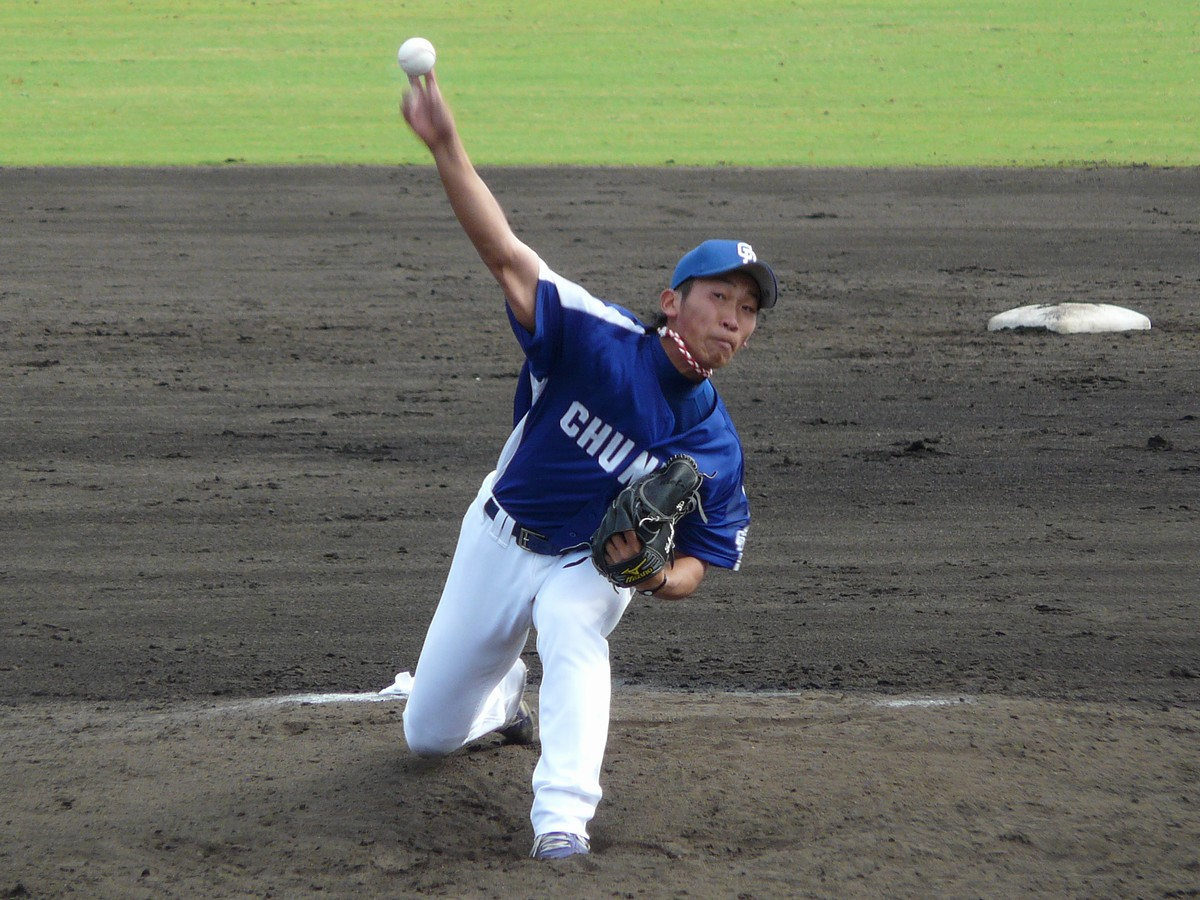
- Pitcher
- Born: August 4, 1990 (age 35); Asaka, Saitama, Japan
- Batted: Right Threw: Right

NPB debut
- June 6, 2010, for the Chunichi Dragons

Last NPB appearance
- June 6, 2010, for the Chunichi Dragons

NPB statistics
- Win–loss record: 0–0
- ERA: 45.00
- Strikeouts: 1
- Stats at Baseball Reference

Teams
- Chunichi Dragons (2010)

Shohei Takashima (髙島 祥平, Takashima Shōhei; born August 4, 1990) is a Japanese former professional baseball pitcher. He played one game in Nippon Professional Baseball in 2010 for the Chunichi Dragons. He attended Teikyo High School.
