= Asaka Station (Saitama) =

Railway station in Asaka, Saitama Prefecture, Japan

TJ12 Asaka Station 朝霞駅
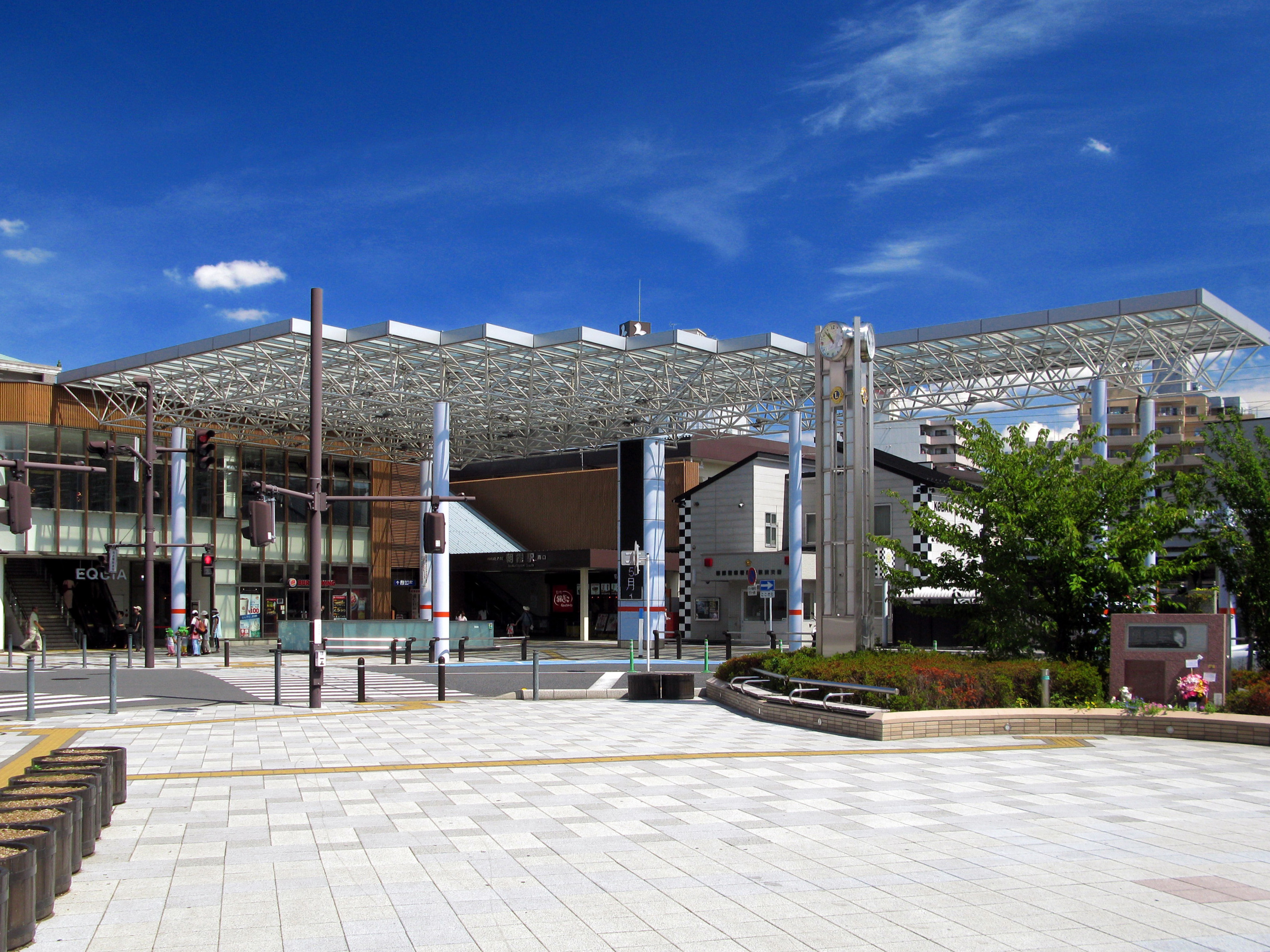
- The south entrance in September 2012

General information
- Location: 2-13-52 Honchō, Asaka-shi, Saitama-ken 351-0011; Japan
- Coordinates: 35.7969°N 139.6001°E
- Operator: Tōbu Railway
- Line: Tōbu Tōjō Line
- Distance: 14.0 km from Ikebukuro
- Platforms: 2 island platforms
- Tracks: 4

Other information
- Station code: TJ-12
- Website: Official website

History
- Opened: 1 May 1914
- Former names: Hizaori (until 1932)

Passengers
- FY2019: 69,779 daily

Services
Preceding station	Tobu Railway	Following station
Asakadai TJ13 towards Yorii	Tojo Line Express Semi Express Local	Wakōshi TJ11 towards Ikebukuro
Location
- Location within Saitama Prefecture Location within Japan

Asaka Station (朝霞駅, Asaka-eki) is a passenger railway station located in the city of Asaka, Saitama, Japan, operated by the private railway operator Tōbu Railway.

== Lines ==
The station is served by the Tōbu Tōjō Line from Ikebukuro in Tokyo, with some services inter-running via the Tokyo Metro Yurakucho Line to Shin-Kiba and the Tokyo Metro Fukutoshin Line to Shibuya and onward via the Tokyu Toyoko Line and Minato Mirai Line to Motomachi-Chukagai. Located between Wakōshi and Asakadai stations, it is 14.0 km from the Ikebukuro terminus. Express, Semi Express and Local services stop at this station.

== Station layout ==
The station consists of two island platforms serving four tracks, with an elevated station building located above the platforms. Chest-high platform edge doors are scheduled to be added by the end of fiscal 2020.

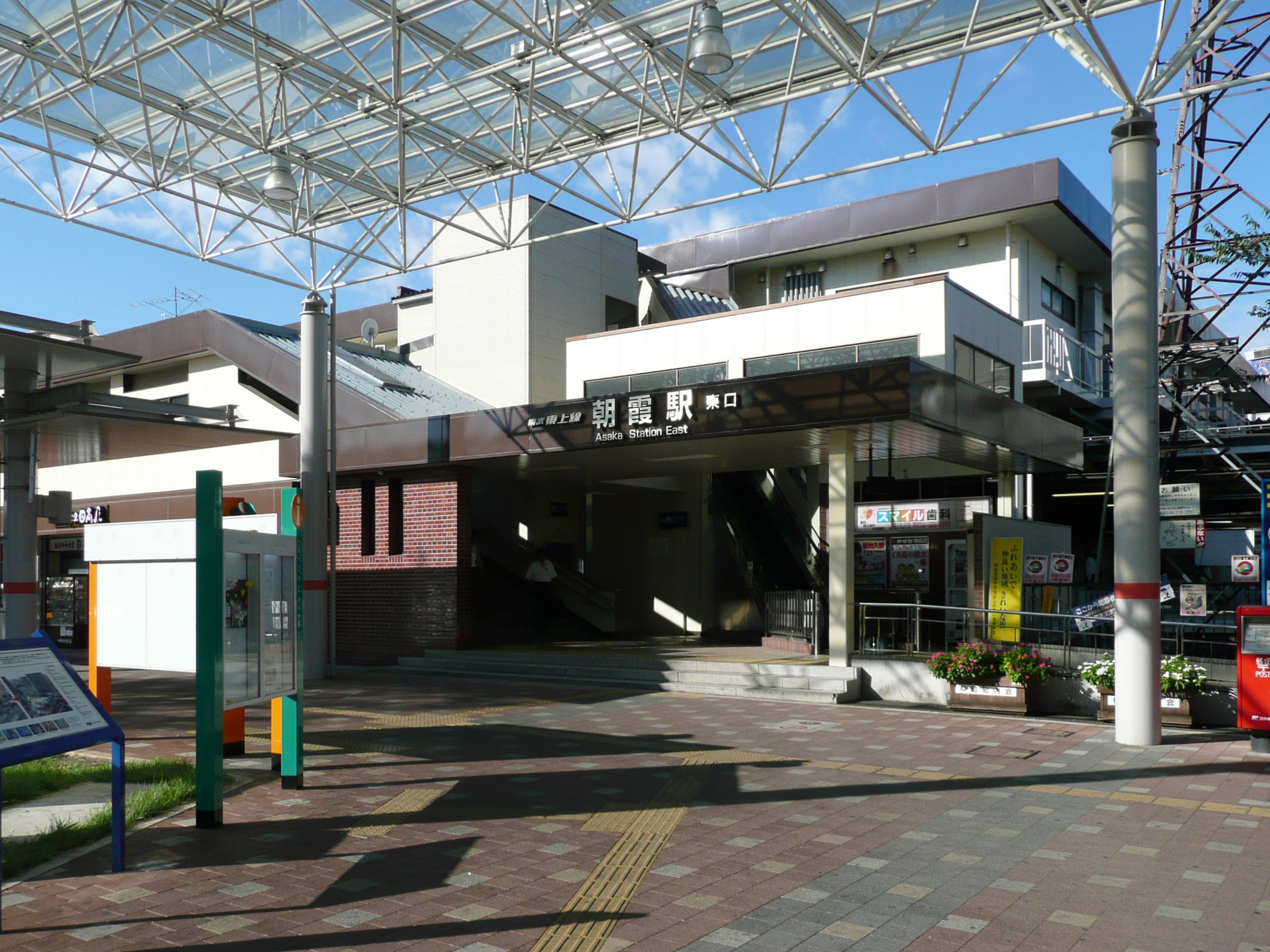
The east entrance in September 2011

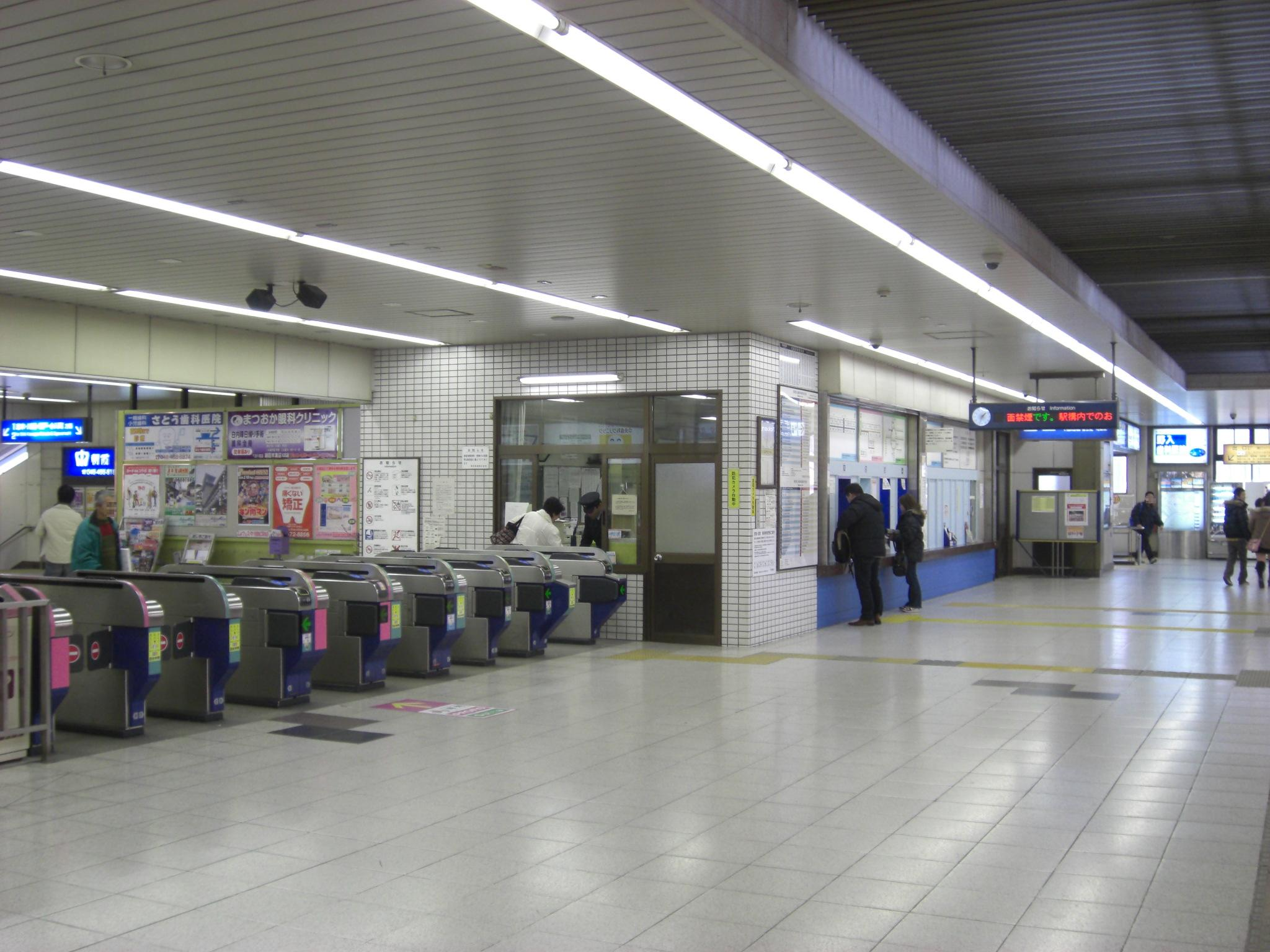
The ticket barriers in February 2009

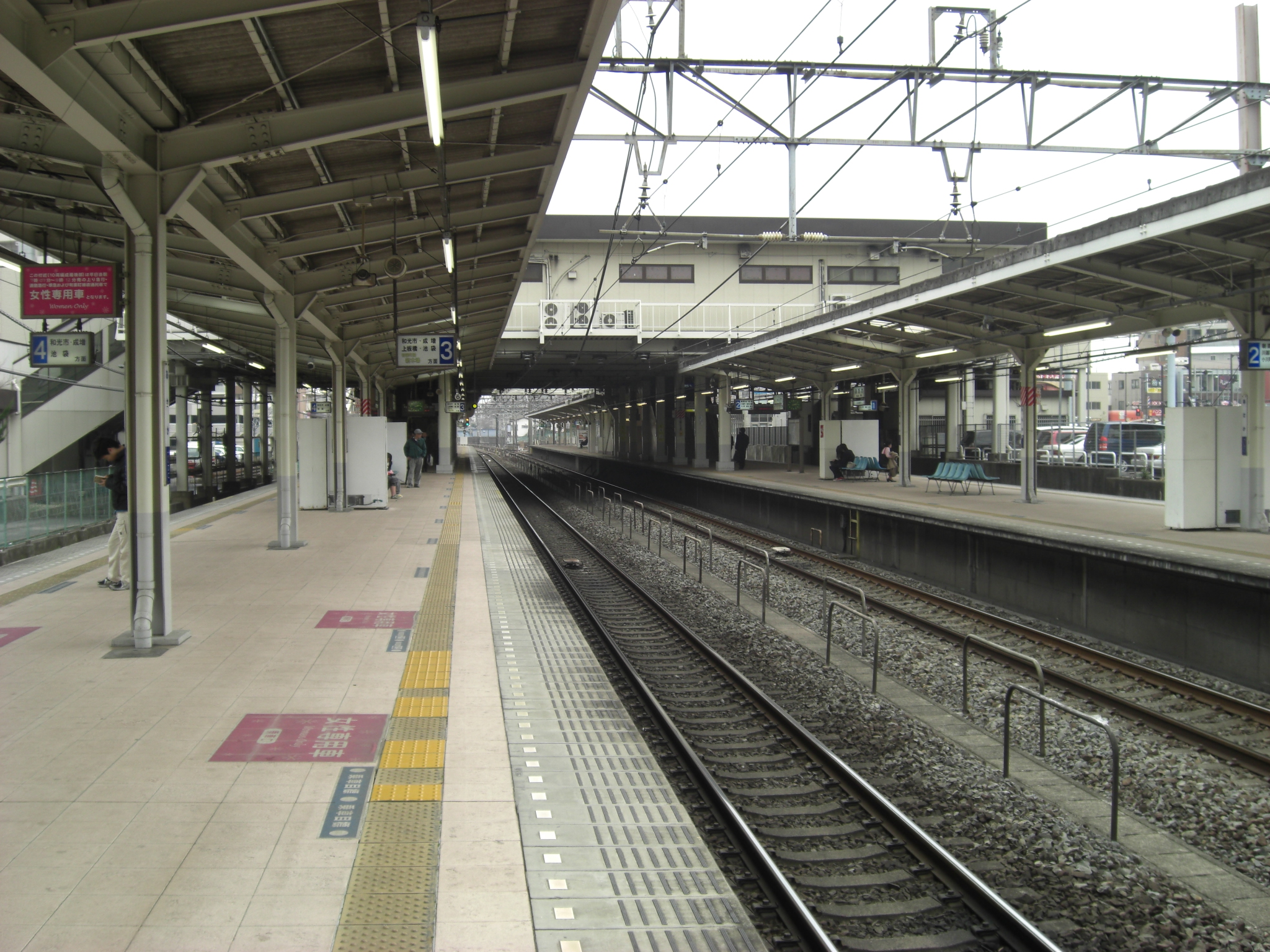
View of the platforms in March 2008

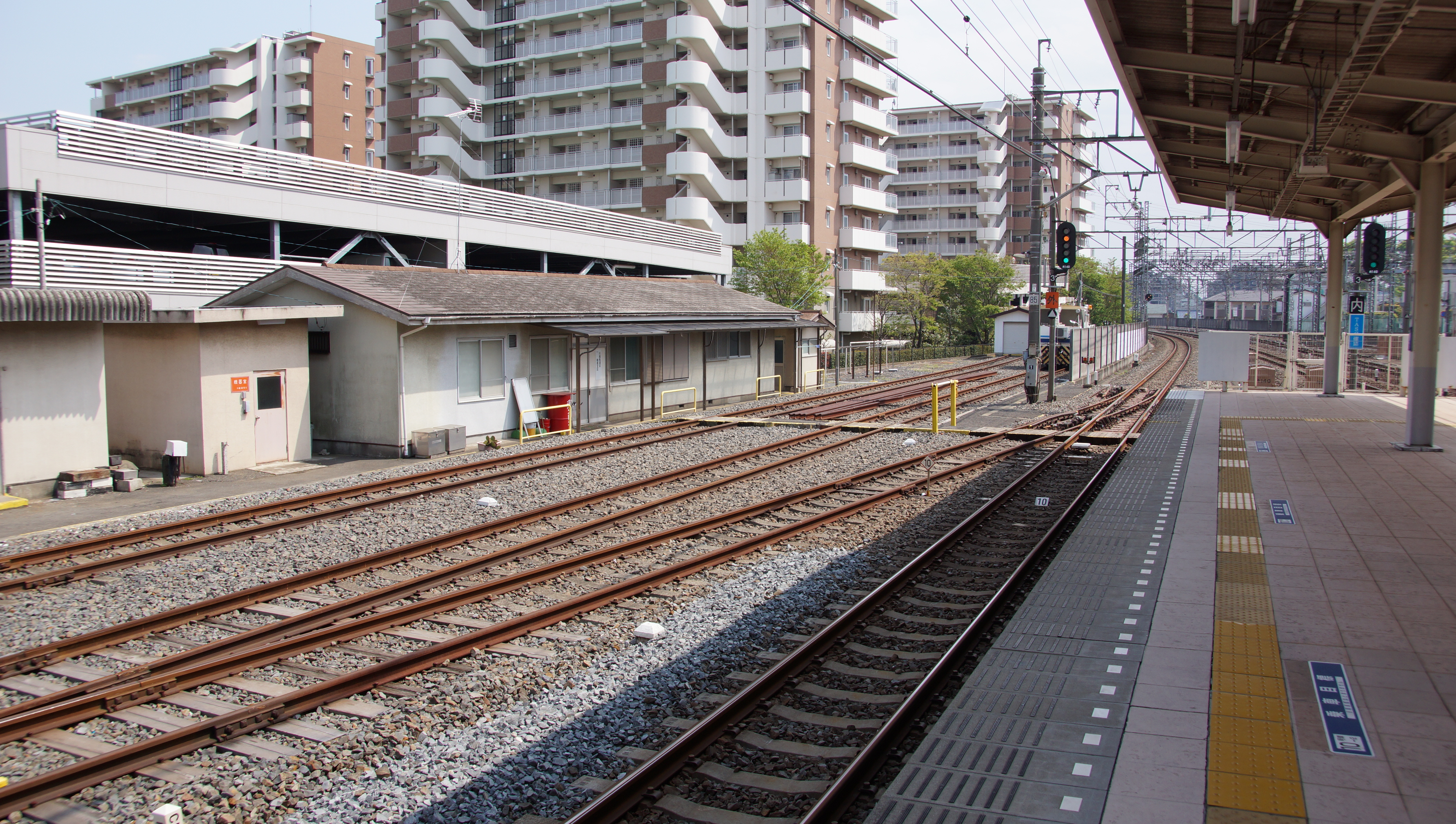
The permanent way maintenance sidings on the east side of the station in April 2014

=== Platforms ===
1	■ Tōbu Tōjō Line	for Shiki, Kawagoe, Sakado, and Ogawamachi (Express, Semi express services)
2	■ Tōbu Tōjō Line	for Shiki, Kawagoe, Sakado, and Ogawamachi (Local services)
3	■ Tōbu Tōjō Line	for Wakōshi, Narimasu, and Ikebukuro; Tokyo Metro Yurakucho Line for Shin-Kiba; Tokyo Metro Fukutoshin Line for Shibuya; Tōkyū Tōyoko Line for Yokohama; Tōkyū Shin-Yokohama Line for Shin-Yokohama via Sōtetsu Shin-Yokohama Line for Ebina and Shōnandai; Minatomirai Line for Motomachi-Chukagai
4	■ Tōbu Tōjō Line	for Wakōshi, Narimasu, and Ikebukuro (Express, Semi express services)

It is planned to have platform edge doors on the Up platform (tracks 3 and 4) in use from 23 March 2019.

== History ==
The station first opened as Hizaori Station (膝折駅) on 1 May 1914, coinciding with the opening of the Tōjō Railway line from Ikebukuro. It was renamed Asaka Station on 10 May 1932.

Through-running to and from Shibuya via the Tokyo Metro Fukutoshin Line commenced on 14 June 2008.

From 17 March 2012, station numbering was introduced on the Tōbu Tōjō Line, with Asaka Station becoming "TJ-12".

Through-running to and from Yokohama and Motomachi-Chukagai via the Tokyu Toyoko Line and Minatomirai Line commenced on 16 March 2013.

From March 2023, Asaka Station became an Express service stop following the abolishment of the Rapid (快速, Kaisoku) services and reorganization of the Tōbu Tōjō Line services. In addition, through service via the Tōkyū Shin-yokohama Line, Sōtetsu Shin-yokohama Line, Sōtetsu Main Line, and Sōtetsu Izumino Line to Shin-Yokohama, Ebina, and Shōnandai commenced.

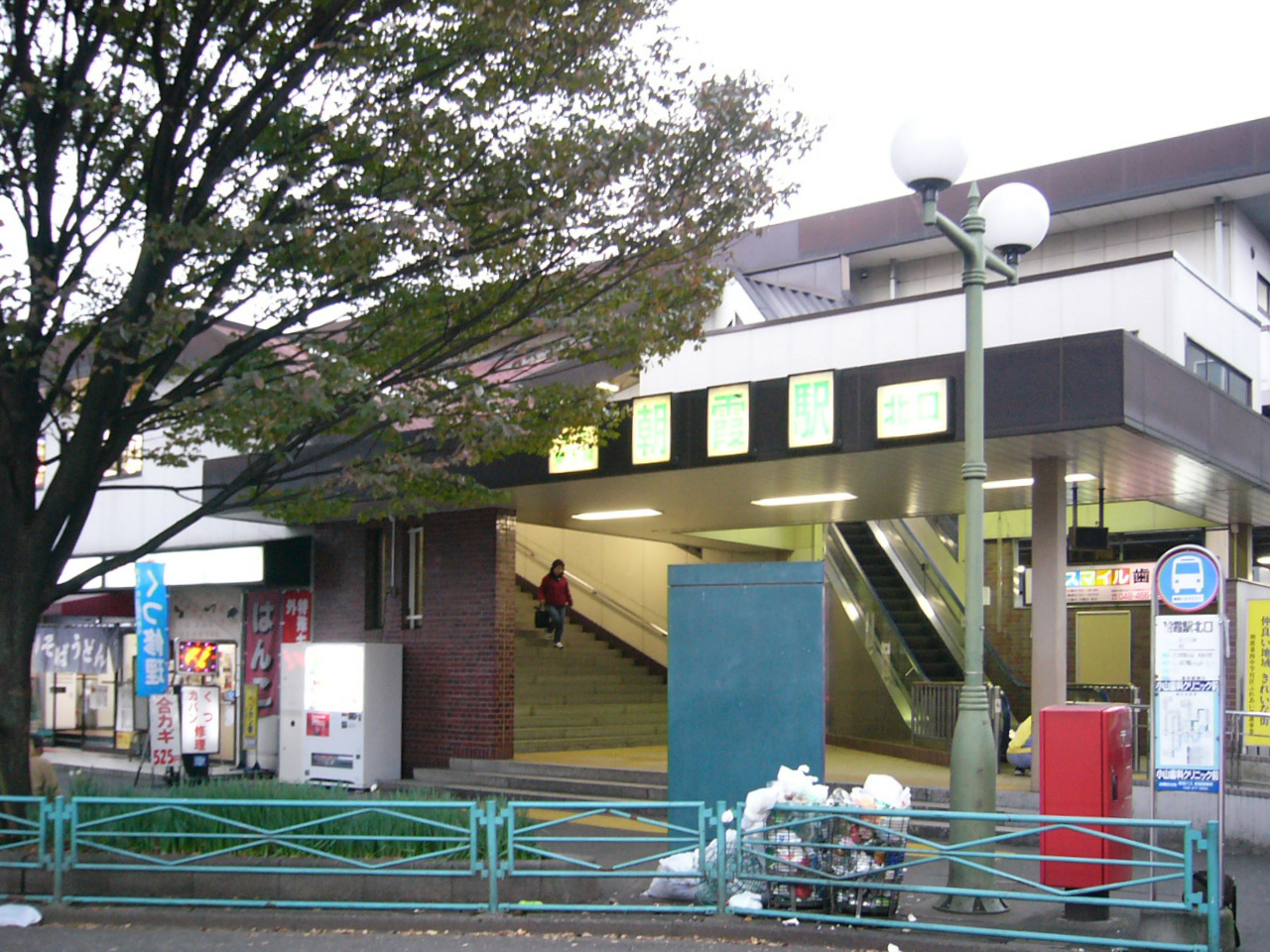
The north entrance (present-day east entrance) in November 2004 before redevelopment

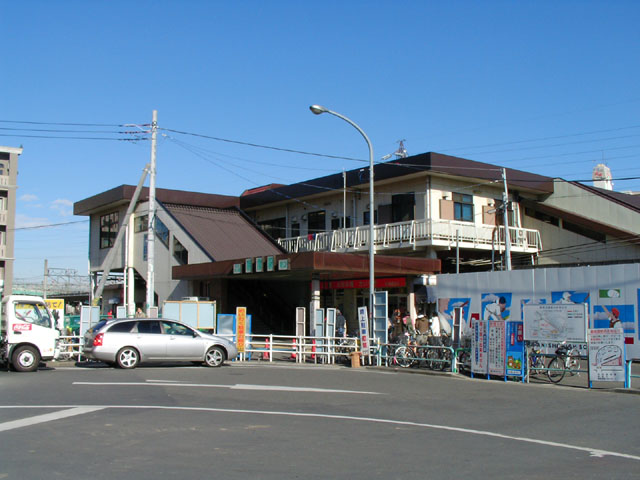
The south entrance in January 2005 before redevelopment

== Passenger statistics ==
In fiscal 2019, the station was used by an average of 69,779 passengers daily.

== Surrounding area ==
- Asaka City Hall
- Asaka Post Office
- JGSDF Camp Asaka

== Bus services ==
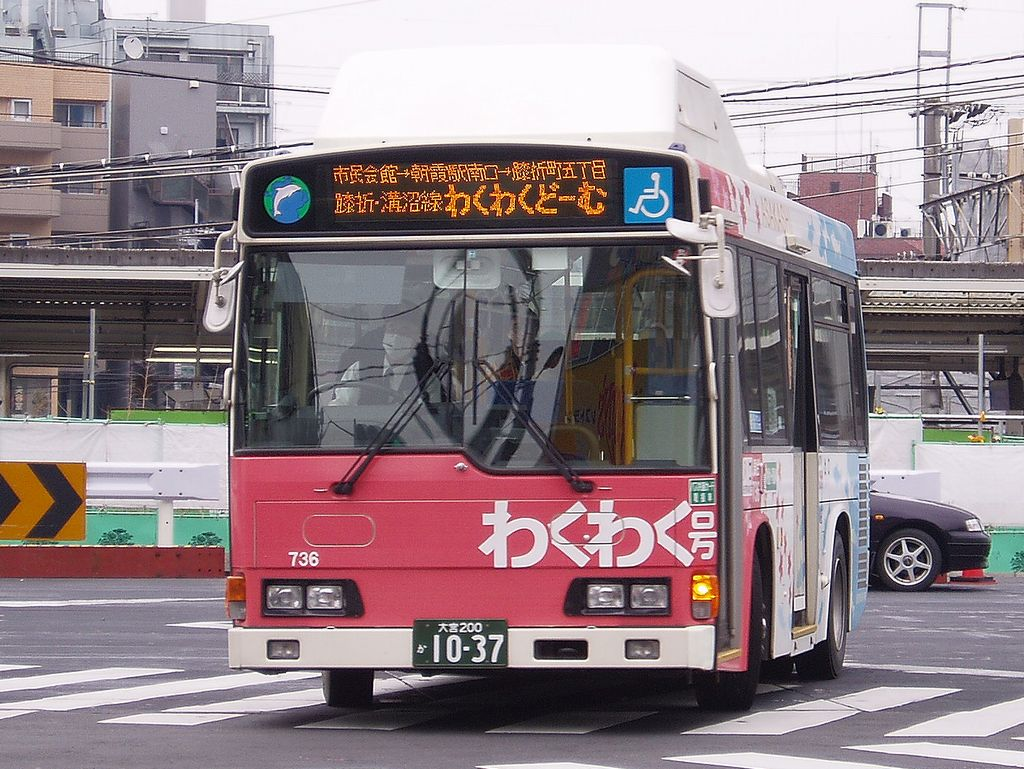
A "Wakuwaku" community bus in front of Asaka Station in April 2006

The station is served by "Wakuwaku" community bus services operated by the city of Asaka.

== See also ==
- Asaka Station (Osaka), on the Hanwa Line in Sakai, Osaka
- List of railway stations in Japan
