= Hinode Station =

Railway station in Tokyo, Japan

Coordinates: 35.6492°N 139.7593°E

U04 Hinode Station 日の出駅
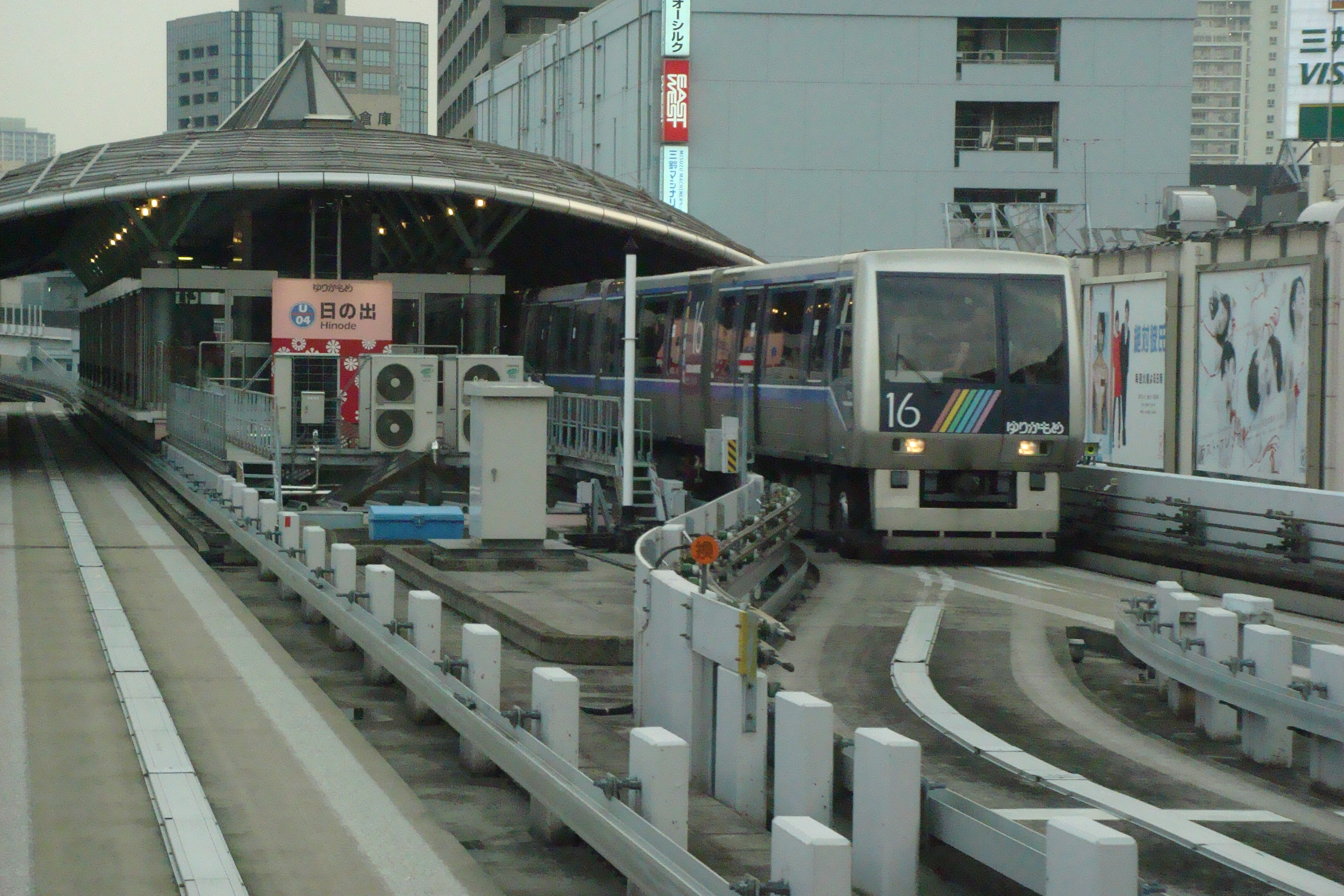
- Hinode Station in 2008

General information
- Location: Minato, Tokyo; Japan
- Operator: Yurikamome, Inc.
- Line: Yurikamome
- Connections: Bus stop

Other information
- Station code: U-04

History
- Opened: 1 November 1995

Passengers
- FY2023: 2,404 (daily)

Services
Preceding station	Yurikamome	Following station
Takeshiba U03 towards Shimbashi	New Transit Yurikamome	Shibaura-futō U05 towards Toyosu
Location

Hinode Station (日の出駅, Hinode-eki) is a station on the Yurikamome Line in Minato, Tokyo, Japan. It is numbered "U-04".

== Station layout ==
The station consists of an elevated island platform.

=== Platforms ===
1	Yurikamome	for Daiba, Aomi, Ariake, and Toyosu
2	Yurikamome	for Shimbashi

== History ==
Hinode Station opened on 1 November 1995.
