= Shibaura-futō Station =

Railway station in Tokyo, Japan

Coordinates: 35.6417°N 139.7578°E

U05 Shibaura-futō Station 芝浦ふ頭駅
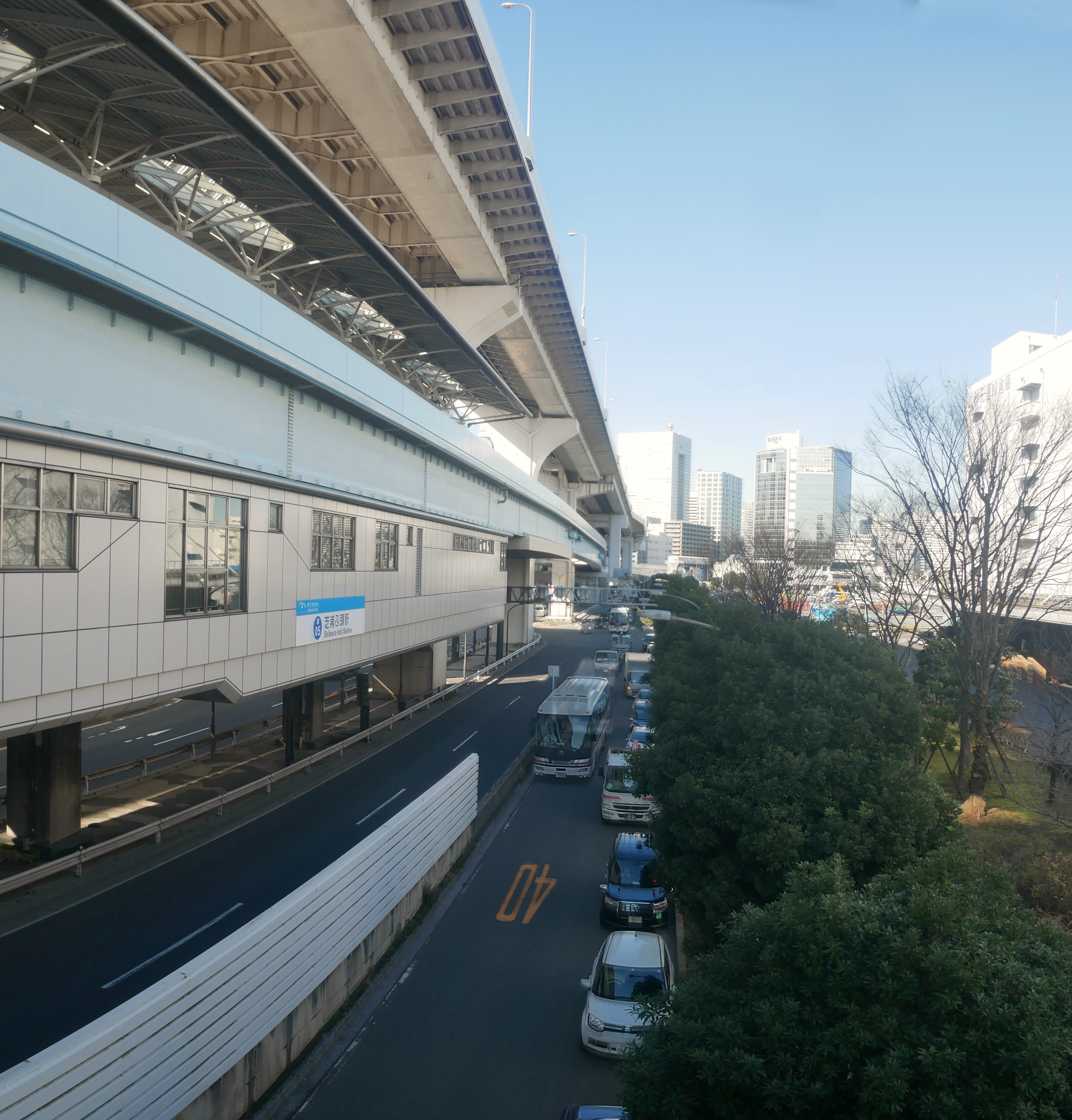

General information
- Location: Minato, Tokyo; Japan
- Operator: Yurikamome, Inc.
- Line: Yurikamome
- Connections: Bus stop

Other information
- Station code: U-05

History
- Opened: 1 November 1995

Passengers
- FY2023: 4,907 (daily)

Services
Preceding station	Yurikamome	Following station
Hinode U04 towards Shimbashi	New Transit Yurikamome	Odaiba-kaihinkōen U06 towards Toyosu
Location

Shibaura-futō Station (芝浦ふ頭駅, Shibaura-futō-eki; lit. "Shibaura Pier Station") is a station on the Yurikamome Line in Minato, Tokyo, Japan. It is numbered "U-05".

== Station layout ==
The station consists of an elevated island platform. It is located below a highway.

=== Platforms ===
1	Yurikamome	for Daiba, Aomi, Ariake, and Toyosu
2	Yurikamome	for Shimbashi

== History ==
Shibaura-futō Station opened on 1 November 1995.
