= Shiodome Station =

Railway and metro station in Tokyo, Japan

Coordinates: 35°39′46.06″N 139°45′35.42″E

U02 Shiodome Station 汐留駅

- Yurikamome station building

General information
- Location: 1-chome, Higashi-Shinbashi District, Minato City, Tokyo; Japan
- Operator: Toei Subway; Yurikamome
- Lines: Ōedo Line; Yurikamome
- Platforms: 2 island platforms (1 for each line)
- Tracks: 4 (2 for each line)

Construction
- Structure type: Underground (Ōedo Line); Elevated (Yurikamome)

Other information
- Station code: E19, U02

History
- Opened: 2 November 2002; 23 years ago

Passengers
- FY2023: 34,991 daily (Ōedo Line); 7,463 daily (Yurikamome)

Services
Preceding station	Toei Subway	Following station
Daimon towards Hikarigaoka	Ōedo Line	Tsukijishijō towards Tochōmae
Preceding station	Yurikamome	Following station
Shimbashi U01 Terminus	New Transit Yurikamome	Takeshiba U03 towards Toyosu
Location
- Location within Tokyo Yamanote Loop Location within Tokyo wards area Location within Japan

Shiodome Station (汐留駅, Shiodome-eki) is a railway station in Minato, Tokyo, Japan. It serves as an interchange for the Toei Ōedo Line (E-19) and Yurikamome (U-02).

== Line ==
- Yurikamome
- Toei Ōedo Line

== Station layout ==
The two parts of the station are not directly linked to one another, and passengers must exit out to ground-level to transfer between them.

=== Toei ===
The Toei part of the station has an underground island platform with two tracks on either side.

1	Ōedo Line	for Ryōgoku and Iidabashi
2	Ōedo Line	for Daimon and Roppongi

Toei ticket gates, 2026

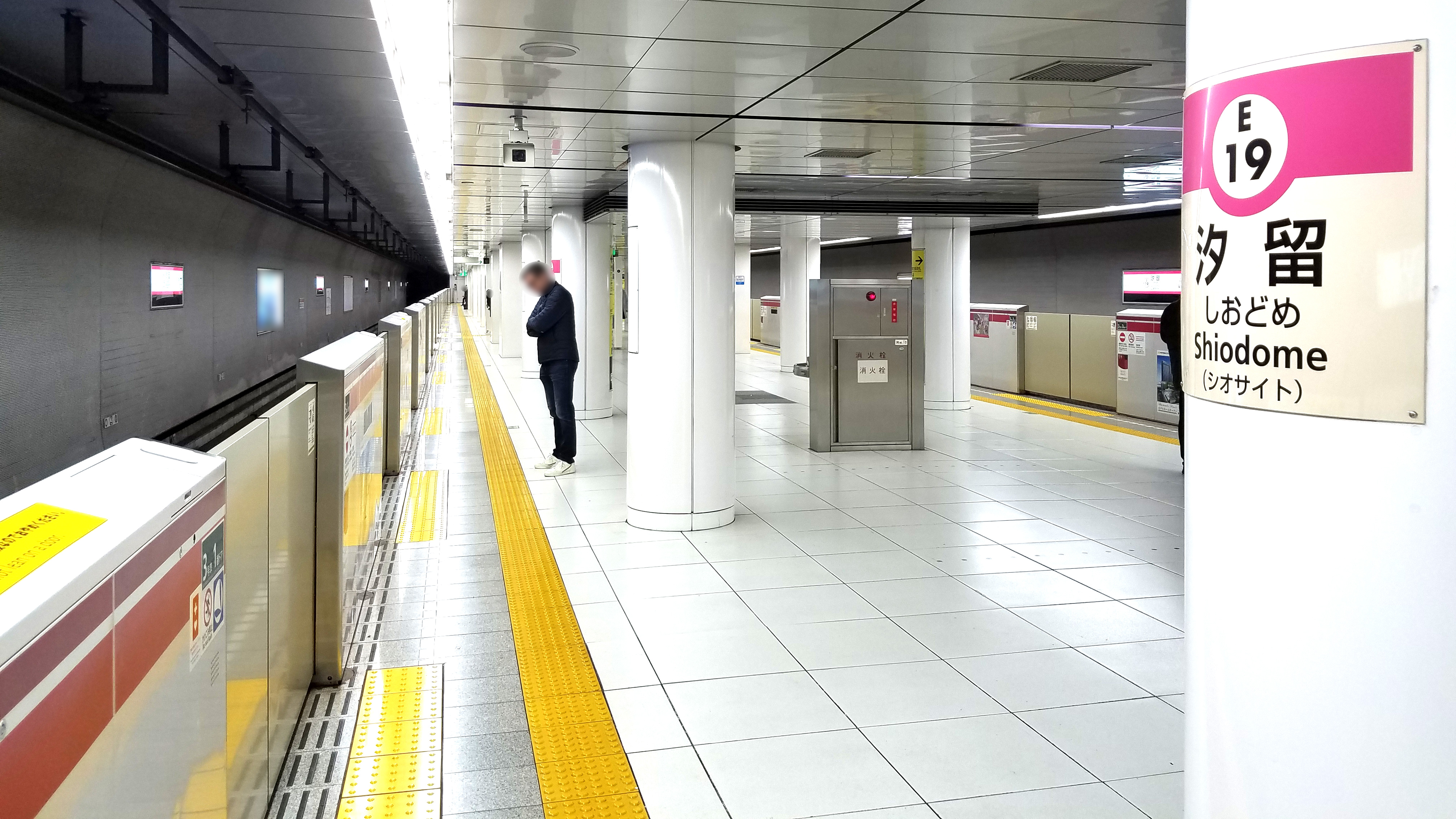
Toei platforms, December 2019

=== Yurikamome ===
The Yurikamome uses an elevated island platform with two tracks on either side.

1	Yurikamome	for Daiba, Aomi, Ariake, and Toyosu
2	Yurikamome	for Shimbashi

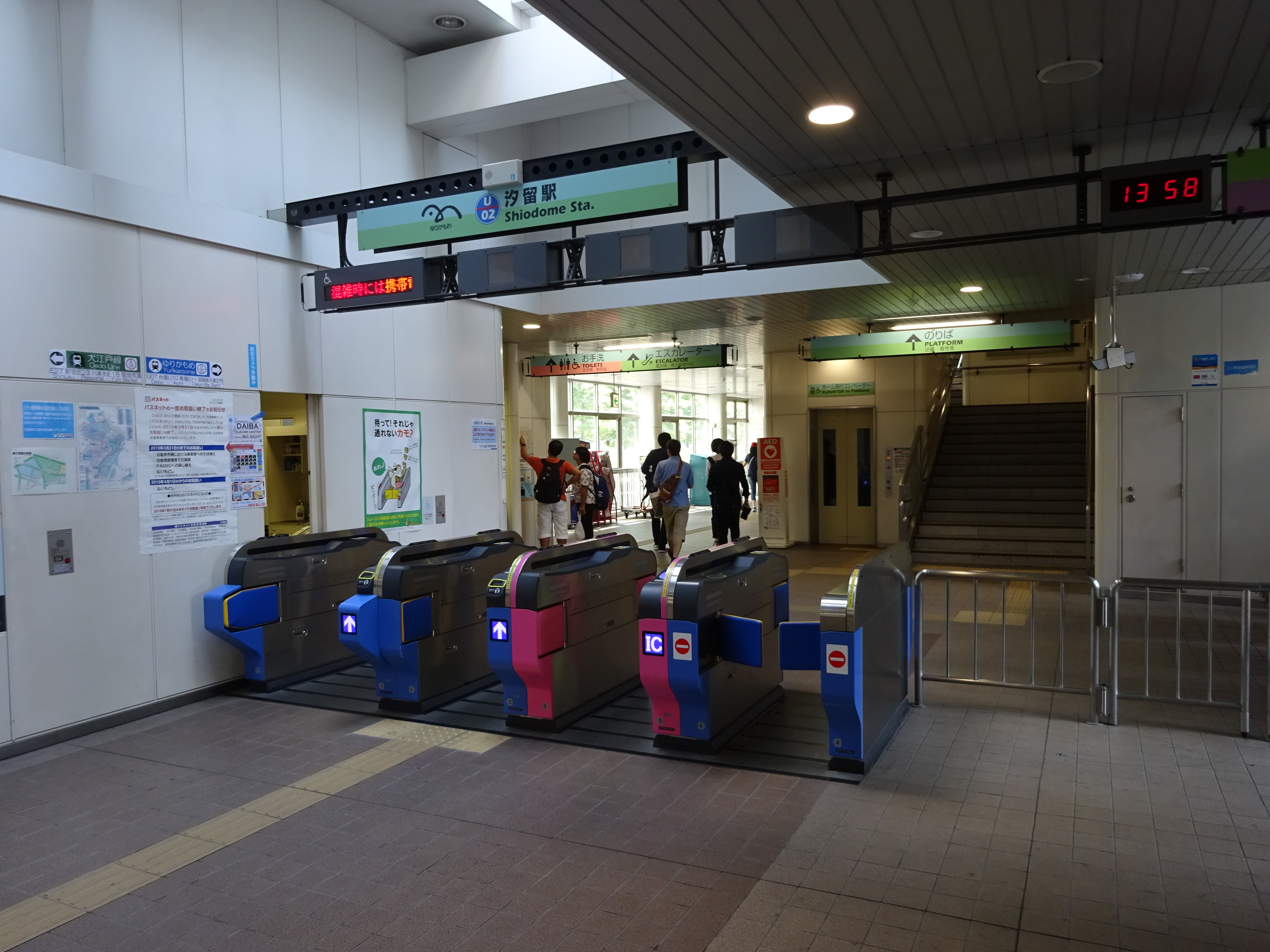
Yurikamome ticket gates

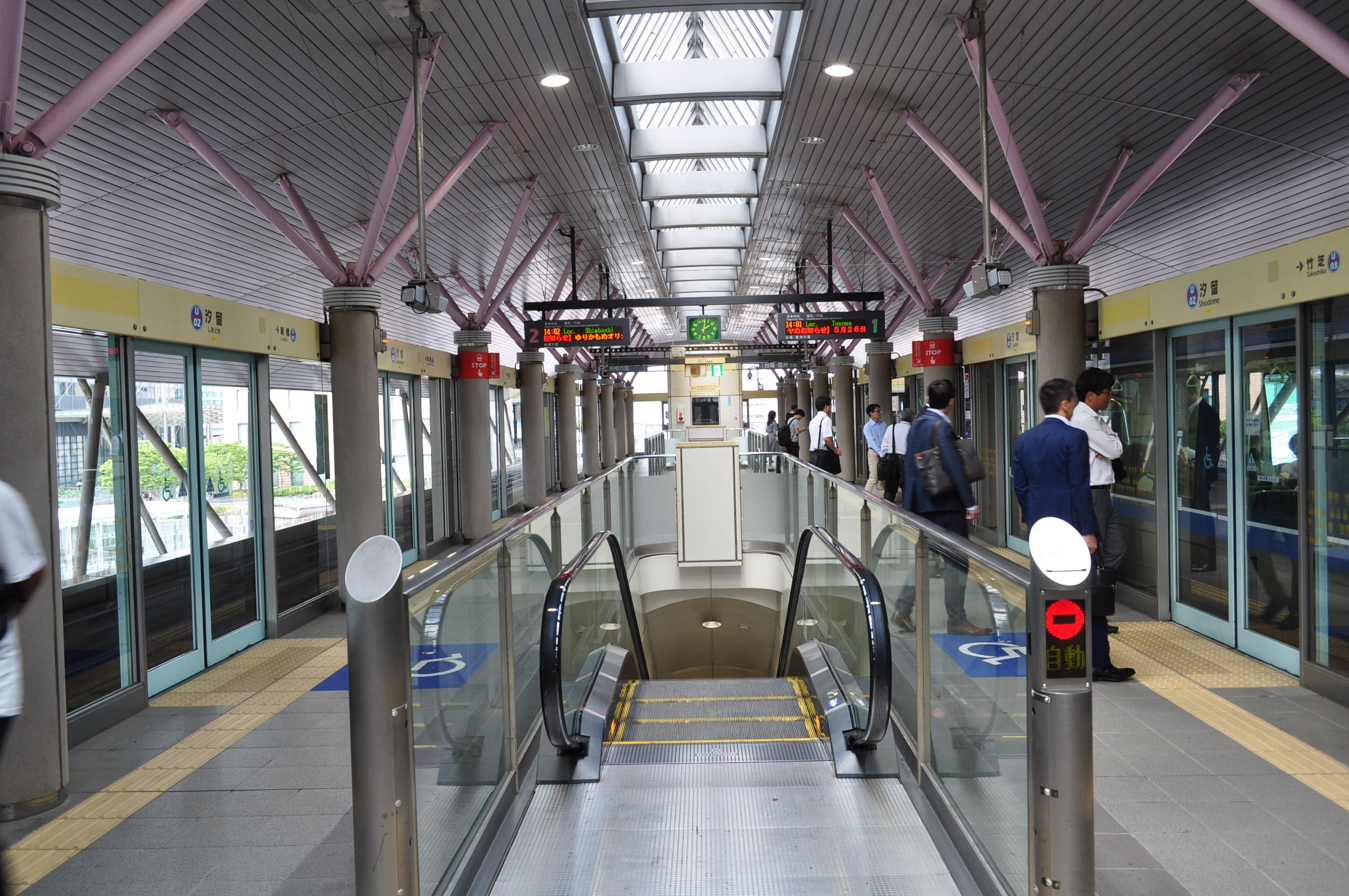
Yurikamome platforms, 2018

== History ==
Although the structures of both the Yurikamome and Toei stations were completed on 1 November 1995 and 12 December 2000, they were not opened yet as the surrounding area was undergoing redevelopment. The stations simultaneously opened for service on 2 November 2002.

== See also ==
- List of railway stations in Japan
