= Odaiba-kaihinkōen Station =

Railway station in Tokyo, Japan

Coordinates: 35.6298°N 139.7784°E

U06 Odaiba-kaihinkōen Station お台場海浜公園駅
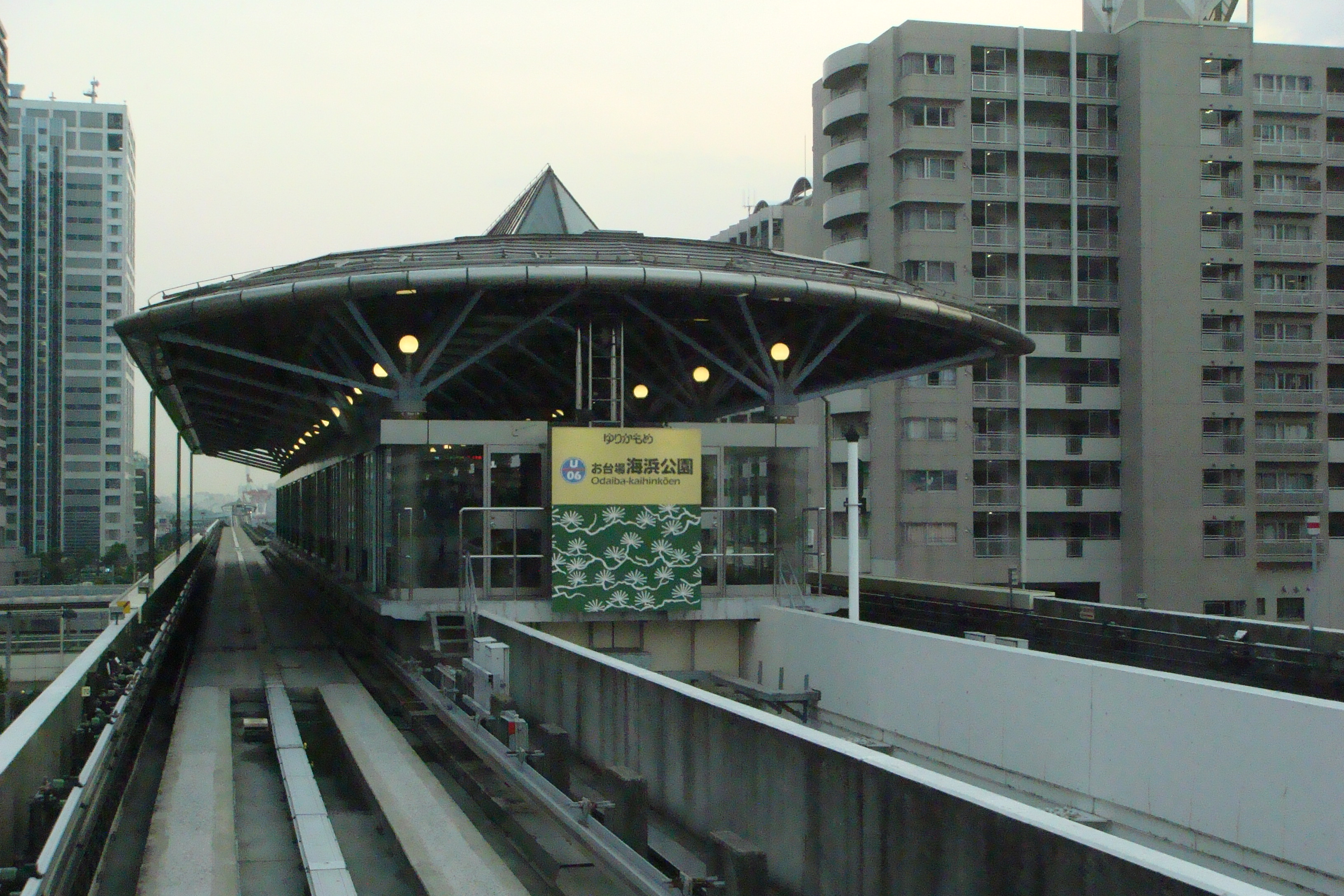
- Odaiba-kaihinkōen Station in 2008

General information
- Location: Minato, Tokyo; Japan
- Operator: Yurikamome, Inc.
- Line: Yurikamome
- Connections: Bus stop

Other information
- Station code: U-06

History
- Opened: 1 November 1995

Passengers
- FY2023: 13,195 (daily)

Services
Preceding station	Yurikamome	Following station
Shibaura-futō U05 towards Shimbashi	New Transit Yurikamome	Daiba U07 towards Toyosu
Location

Odaiba-kaihinkōen Station (お台場海浜公園駅, Odaiba-kaihinkōen-eki; lit. "Odaiba Seaside Park") is a station on the Yurikamome Line in Minato, Tokyo, Japan. It is numbered "U-06".

== Station layout ==
The station consists of an elevated island platform.

=== Platforms ===
1	Yurikamome	for Daiba, Aomi, Ariake, and Toyosu
2	Yurikamome	for Shimbashi

== History ==
Odaiba-kaihinkōen Station opened on 1 November 1995.
