= Ariake Coliseum =

Indoor sporting arena in Japan

Coordinates: 35°38′11″N 139°47′25″E

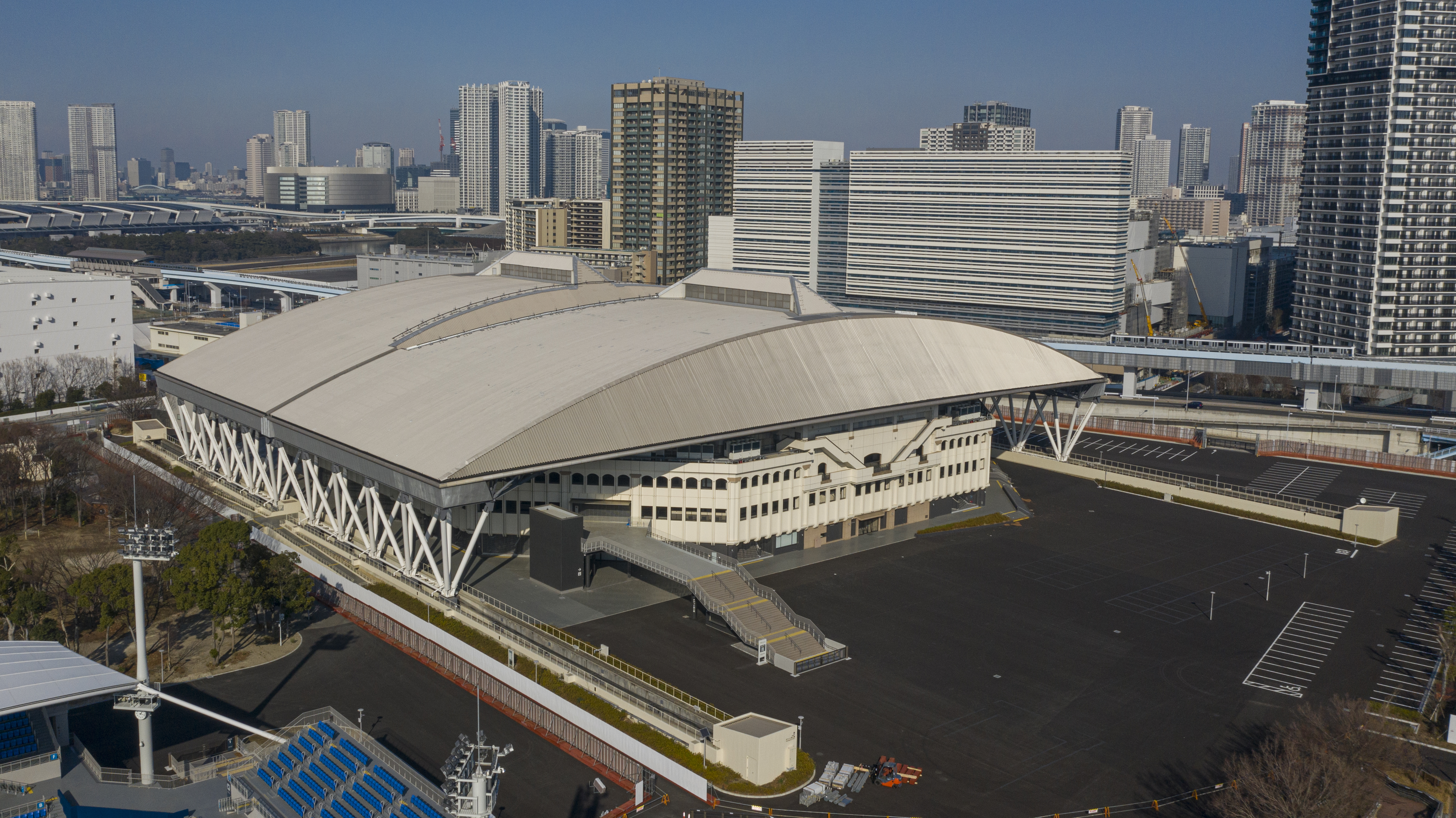
- Interactive map of Ariake Coliseum
- Location: Kōtō, Tokyo, Japan
- Owner: Tokyo Metropolitan Government
- Capacity: 10,000
- Public transit: Rinkai (Kokusai-Tenjijō: R-03); Yurikamome (Ariake-Tennis-no-mori: U-13); Tokyo BRT (Ariake-Tennis-no-mori: B-04)

Construction
- Groundbreaking: 1985
- Opened: 1987

Tenants
- Japan Open (1987–present); All Japan Tennis (1987–present); Nichirei International Championships (1990–1996); Toyota Princess Cup (1997–2002); Tokyo Apache (bj league) (2005–2009); FIVB World Grand Prix (2006–2007); FIVB World League (2008–2009); Toray Pan Pacific Open (2008–present); 2020 Summer Olympics

Ariake Coliseum (有明コロシアム, Ariake Koroshiamu) is an indoor sporting arena in Ariake Tennis Park located in Ariake, Kōtō, Tokyo, Japan. It has a capacity of 10,000 and is one of the few professional tennis venues which has a retractable roof.

When Ariake Coluseum first opened, it had no roof, but its sliding roof was installed in April 1991, making it the first stadium in Japan with a retractable roof, and the third overall after the Rod Laver Arena in Melbourne and the SkyDome in Toronto.

== Events ==
The arena is used as the center court for the Japan Open and the Pan Pacific Open, held in Ariake Tennis Forest Park.

This venue will also host Road FC 24, instead of Ryogoku Kokugikan.

The venue also hosted the tennis events for the 2020 Summer Olympics.

In 1995, Fuji TV's hit cooking show Iron Chef held its 1995 World Cup there, with the court converted into an outdoor version of Kitchen Stadium. Iron Chef Japanese Rokusaburo Michiba won the four-person single elimination tournament to determine the best chef in the world, with the other participants being Pierre Gagnaire, Gianfranco Vissani and Xu Cheng.

This was also the homeground arena for Pro Wrestling NOAH from the year 2000 with the Destiny event. Since then, they had been doing shows actively until 2015.

== See also ==
- List of tennis stadiums by capacity
