= Tokyo International Cruise Terminal =

Cruise ship terminal in Tokyo, Japan

- 東京国際クルーズターミナル
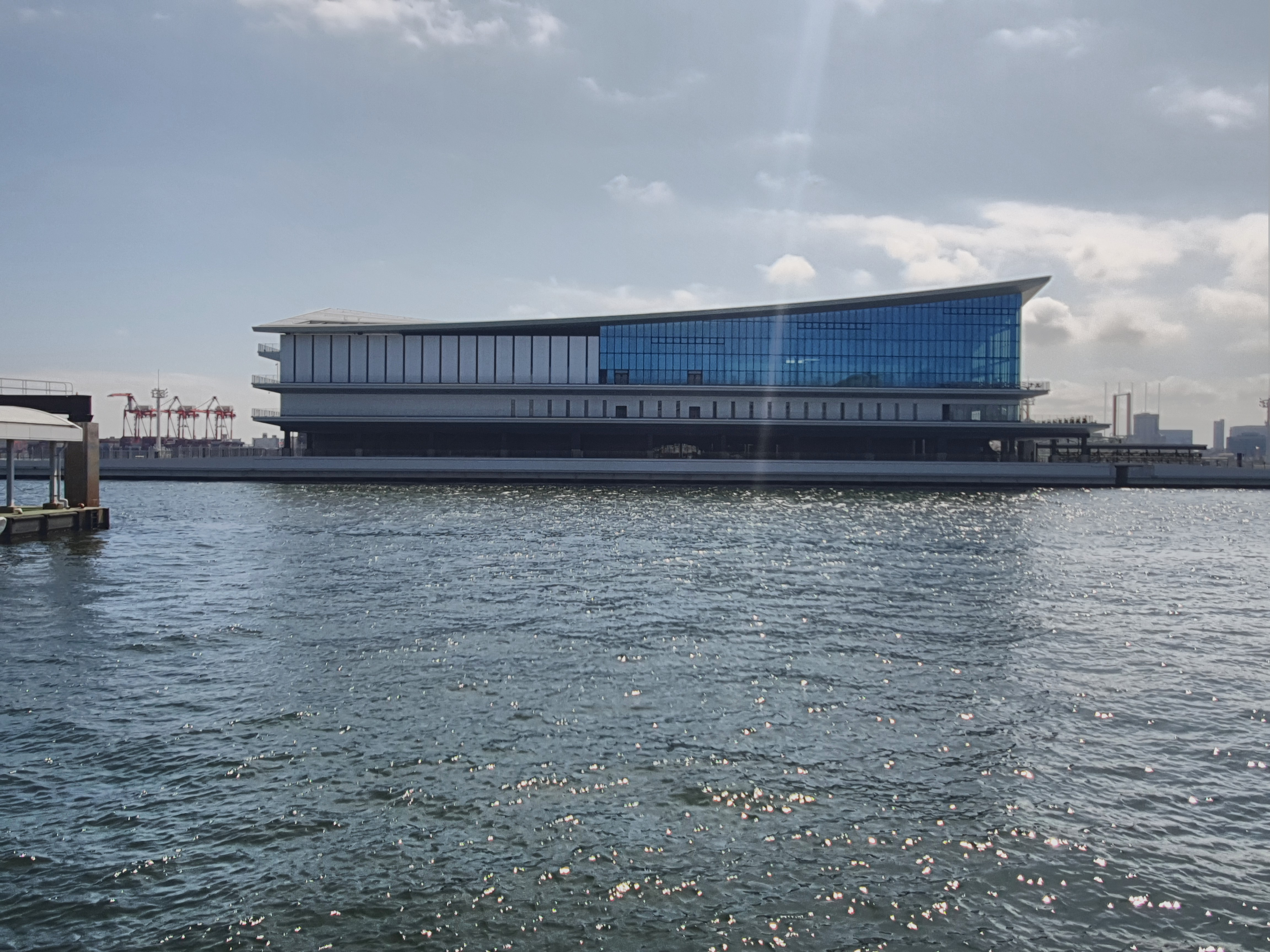
- Tokyo International Cruise Terminal
- Interactive map of the Tokyo International Cruise Terminal area

General information
- Type: Passenger ship terminal
- Location: Aomi, Tokyo, Japan
- Coordinates: 35°37′3.7″N 139°46′14.5″E
- Construction started: June 2018
- Completed: June 2020
- Opened: 10 September 2020
- Owner: Tokyo Metropolitan Government
- Operator: Tokyo Port Terminal Corporation

Height
- Height: 35 m (115 ft)

Technical details
- Size: 214,238 m^{2} (2,306,040 sq ft)
- Floor count: 4
- Floor area: 19,114 m^{2} (205,740 sq ft)

Design and construction
- Architects: Yasui Architects & Engineers
- Main contractor: Penta-Ocean

Other information
- Public transit: Yurikamome (Tokyo International Cruise Terminal)

The Tokyo International Cruise Terminal (Japanese: 東京国際クルーズターミナル, Hepburn: Tōkyō Kokusai Kurūzu Tāminaru) is a cruise ship terminal located in the Aomi area of Tokyo, Japan. Operated by the Tokyo Port Terminal Corporation on behalf of the Tokyo Metropolitan Government, it opened on 10 September 2020 as Tokyo's primary international cruise gateway.

== Overview ==
International cruise ships serving Tokyo had called at the Harumi Passenger Terminal in Harumi since 23 May 1991. Although equipped with customs, immigration and quarantine (CIQ) facilities, Harumi's location required vessels to pass beneath the Rainbow Bridge, which has a 52-metre (171 ft) air draft. As cruise ships increased in size, larger post-Panamax vessels were unable to clear the bridge. Some ships instead used cargo berths at Shinagawa and Ōi.

In 2015 the Tokyo Metropolitan Government announced plans to construct a new passenger terminal with direct access to Tokyo Bay in time for the 2020 Summer Olympics. The new facility was developed on reclaimed land at Aomi, outside the bridge's navigational constraint.

At opening, the quay measured 430 metres (1,410 ft) and provided one berth, with long-term plans to extend it to 680 metres (2,230 ft) and develop a second berth.

== History ==
The facility's name, Tokyo International Cruise Terminal, was announced on 9 July 2018. On 7 September 2018, the government set the opening date for 14 July 2020 and identified Spectrum of the Seas as the inaugural vessel.

In anticipation of the opening, the nearby Yurikamome station was renamed Tokyo International Cruise Terminal Station on 16 March 2019.

Construction was completed in June 2020, but on 12 June 2020 the opening was postponed due to the global suspension of cruise operations during the COVID-19 pandemic. On 14 August 2020 the revised opening date was set for 10 September 2020, and the Japanese training sailing ship Nippon Maru was designated as the first arriving vessel, calling on 26 August.

On 2 March 2023, the German cruise ship MS Amadea became the first foreign-flag cruise ship to call at the terminal. A welcoming ceremony was held the same day, attended by Tokyo Governor Yuriko Koike.

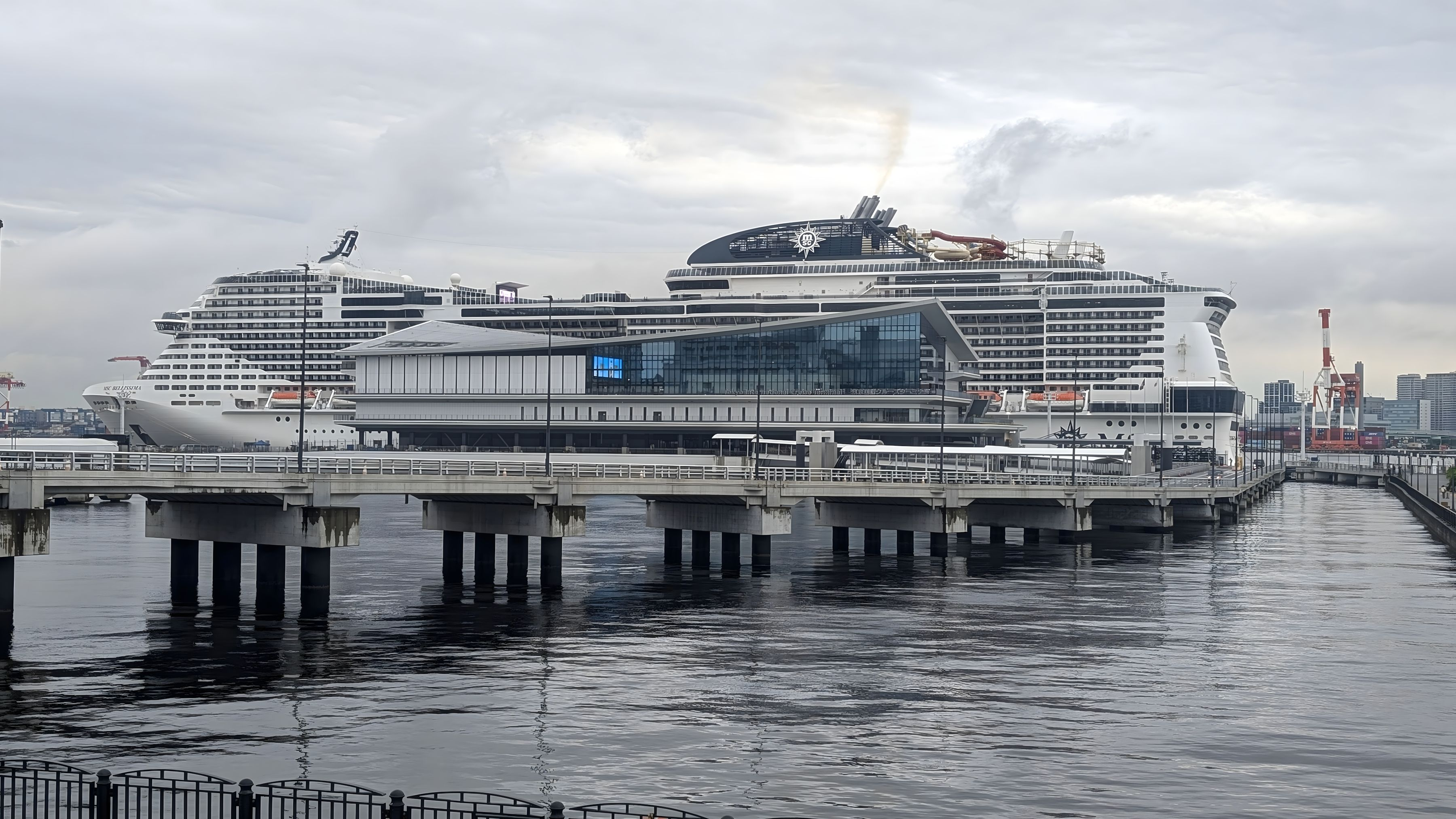
MSC Bellissima at the Tokyo International Cruise Terminal, October 2025

On 12 March 2024, MSC Bellissima made its first call, becoming the largest cruise ship ever to enter Tokyo Port at the time.

On 29 November 2024, Oriental Land Company announced that the terminal would serve as the home port for its planned operations with Disney Cruise Line, with service scheduled to begin in 2029.

== Design and facilities ==
The four-story terminal building has a total floor area of 19,114 square metres (205,740 sq ft) on a 214,238 square metres (2,306,040 sq ft) waterfront site. The wharf extends 430 metres (1,410 ft), with a 30-metre (98 ft) apron and water depth of 11.5 metres (38 ft).

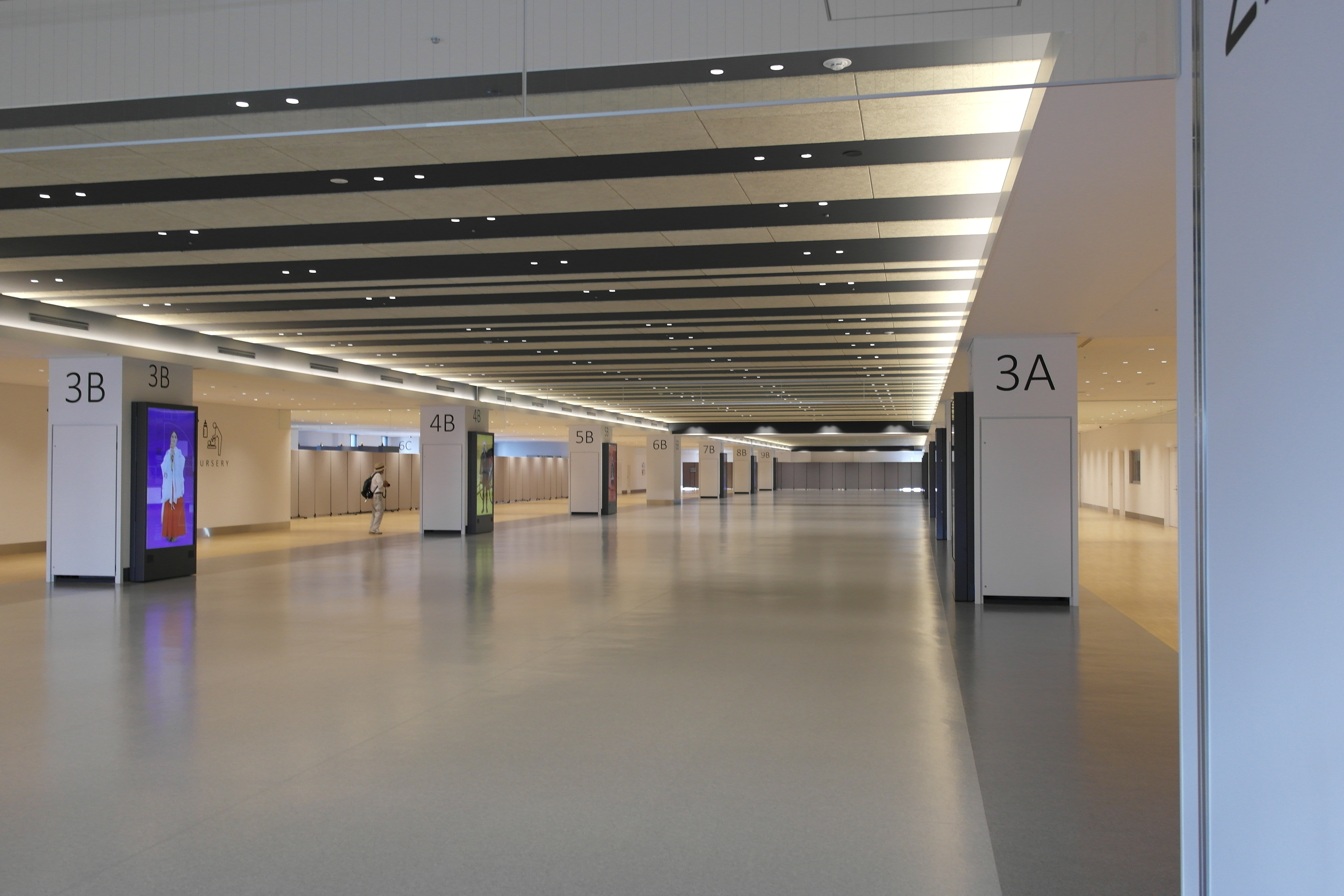
Customs, immigration, and quarantine (CIQ) inspection area

The ground floor contains the main entrance hall. On the second floor, arriving passengers proceed through the arrival lobby, baggage hall, and customs, immigration, and quarantine (CIQ) inspection area, while during embarkation the same space functions as a waiting area. The third floor provides check-in counters and additional CIQ inspection space, and the fourth floor contains reception lounges. When cruise ships are not in port, the facilities are rented out for exhibitions and other events.

The exterior design evokes ocean waves and ship sails, characterized by a sweeping, twisting roof rising to 35 metres (115 ft). Structurally, the pier and terminal building form an integrated unit: steel pipe piles supporting the quay are directly connected to the building's steel columns and anchored deep into the seabed's load-bearing strata.

Because of the roof's complex geometry, a three-dimensional stainless-steel waterproof seam welding method was used during construction. The roof also contributes to environmental performance by admitting natural light from the north and assisting passive heat ventilation in summer and heat retention in winter.

The terminal is approximately an eight-minute walk from Tokyo International Cruise Terminal Station on the Yurikamome.
