= Tokyo Big Sight Station =

Railway station in Tokyo, Japan

Coordinates: 35.6302°N 139.7914°E

U11 Tokyo Big Sight Station 東京ビッグサイト駅
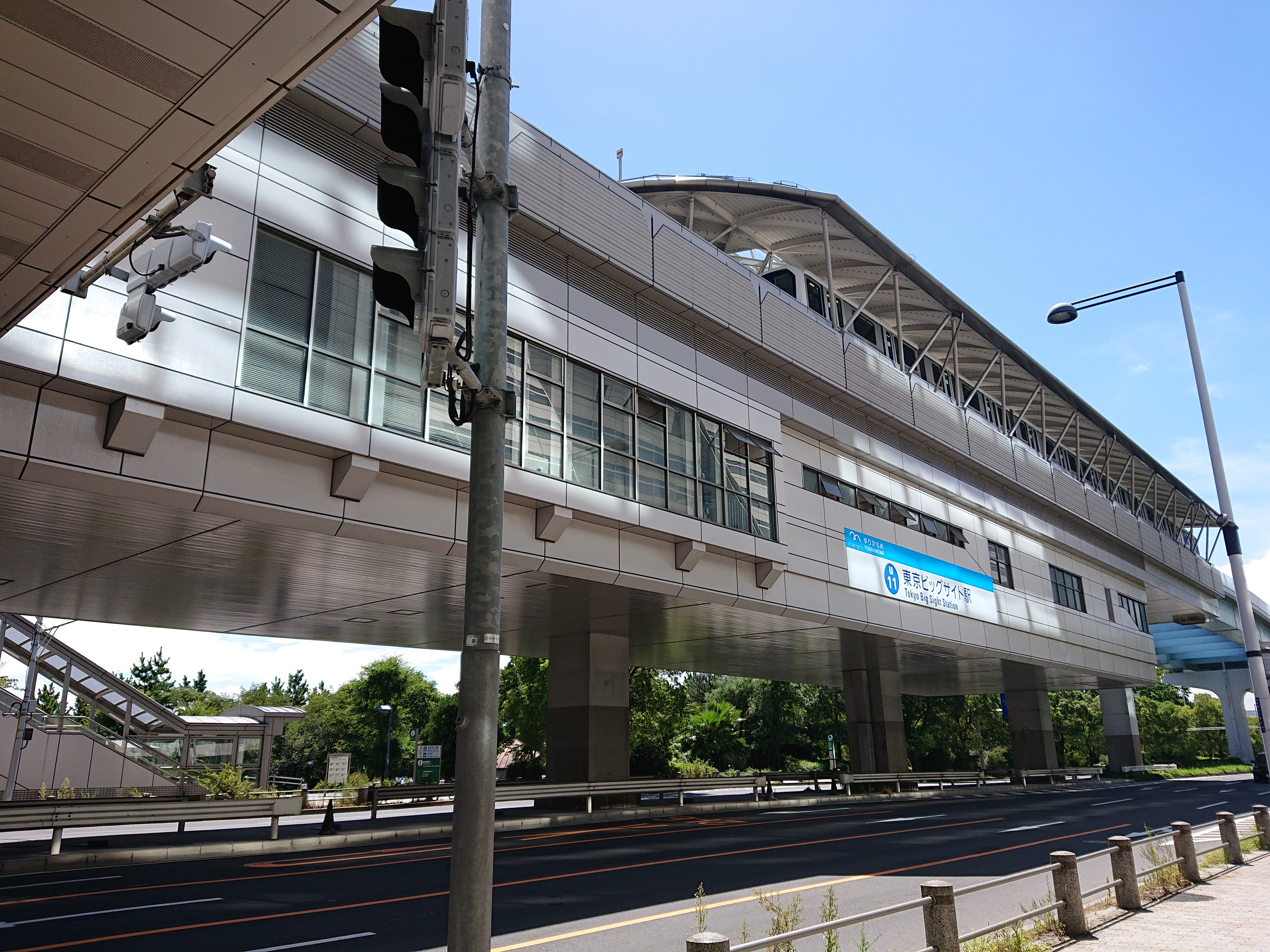

General information
- Location: Kōtō, Tokyo; Japan
- Operator: Yurikamome, Inc.
- Line: Yurikamome

Other information
- Station code: U-11

History
- Opened: 1 November 1995

Passengers
- FY2023: 19,352 (daily)

Services
Preceding station	Yurikamome	Following station
Aomi U10 towards Shimbashi	New Transit Yurikamome	Ariake U12 towards Toyosu
Location

Tokyo Big Sight Station (東京ビッグサイト駅, Tōkyō Biggu Saito-eki) is a station on the Yurikamome Line in Kōtō, Tokyo, Japan. It is numbered "U-11".

== Station layout ==
The station consists of an elevated island platform.

=== Platforms ===
1	Yurikamome	for Toyosu
2	Yurikamome	for Daiba and Shimbashi

== History ==
The station opened on 1 November 1995, with the name Kokusai-tenjijō-seimon Station (国際展示場正門駅, Kokusai-tenjijō-seimon-eki; lit. “International Exhibition Center Main Entrance Station"). On 16 March 2019, it was renamed to its current name.

== Surrounding area ==
- Tokyo Big Sight
