= Telecom Center Station =

Railway station in Tokyo, Japan

Coordinates: 35.6176°N 139.7795°E

U09 Telecom Center Station テレコムセンター駅
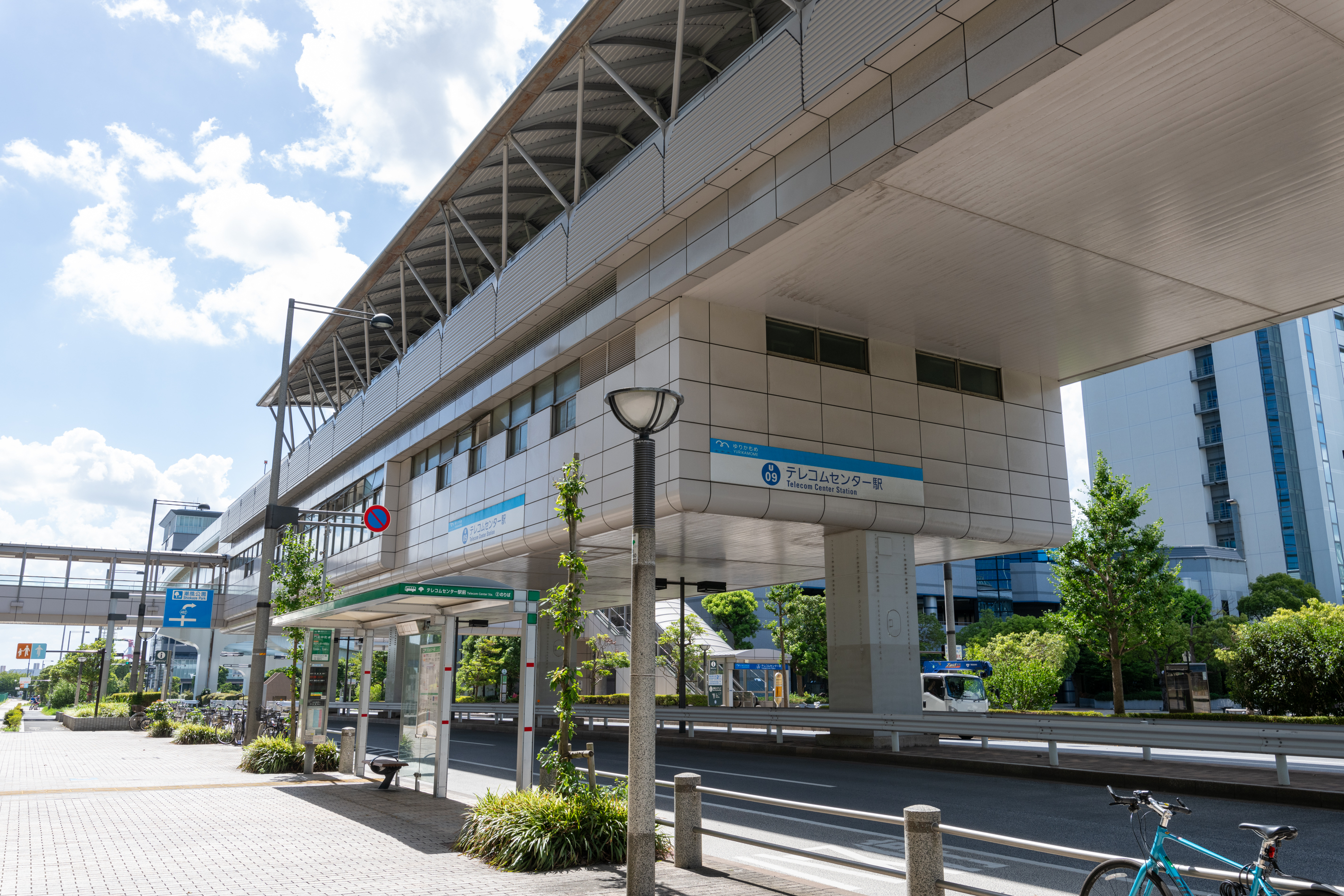

General information
- Location: Kōtō, Tokyo; Japan
- Operator: Yurikamome, Inc.
- Line: Yurikamome
- Connections: Bus stop

Other information
- Station code: U-09

History
- Opened: 1 November 1995

Passengers
- FY2023: 8,505 (daily)

Services
Preceding station	Yurikamome	Following station
Tokyo International Cruise Terminal U08 towards Shimbashi	New Transit Yurikamome	Aomi U10 towards Toyosu
Location

Telecom Center Station (テレコムセンター駅, Terekomu Sentā-eki) is a station on the Yurikamome Line in Kōtō, Tokyo, Japan. It is numbered "U-09". It is named after the adjacent Telecom Center building.

== Station layout ==
The station consists of an elevated island platform.

=== Platforms ===
1	Yurikamome	for Toyosu
2	Yurikamome	for Daiba and Shimbashi

== History ==
Telecom Center Station opened on 1 November 1995.
