= Tokyo Garden Theatre =

Indoor event hall in Japan

Tokyo Garden Theater
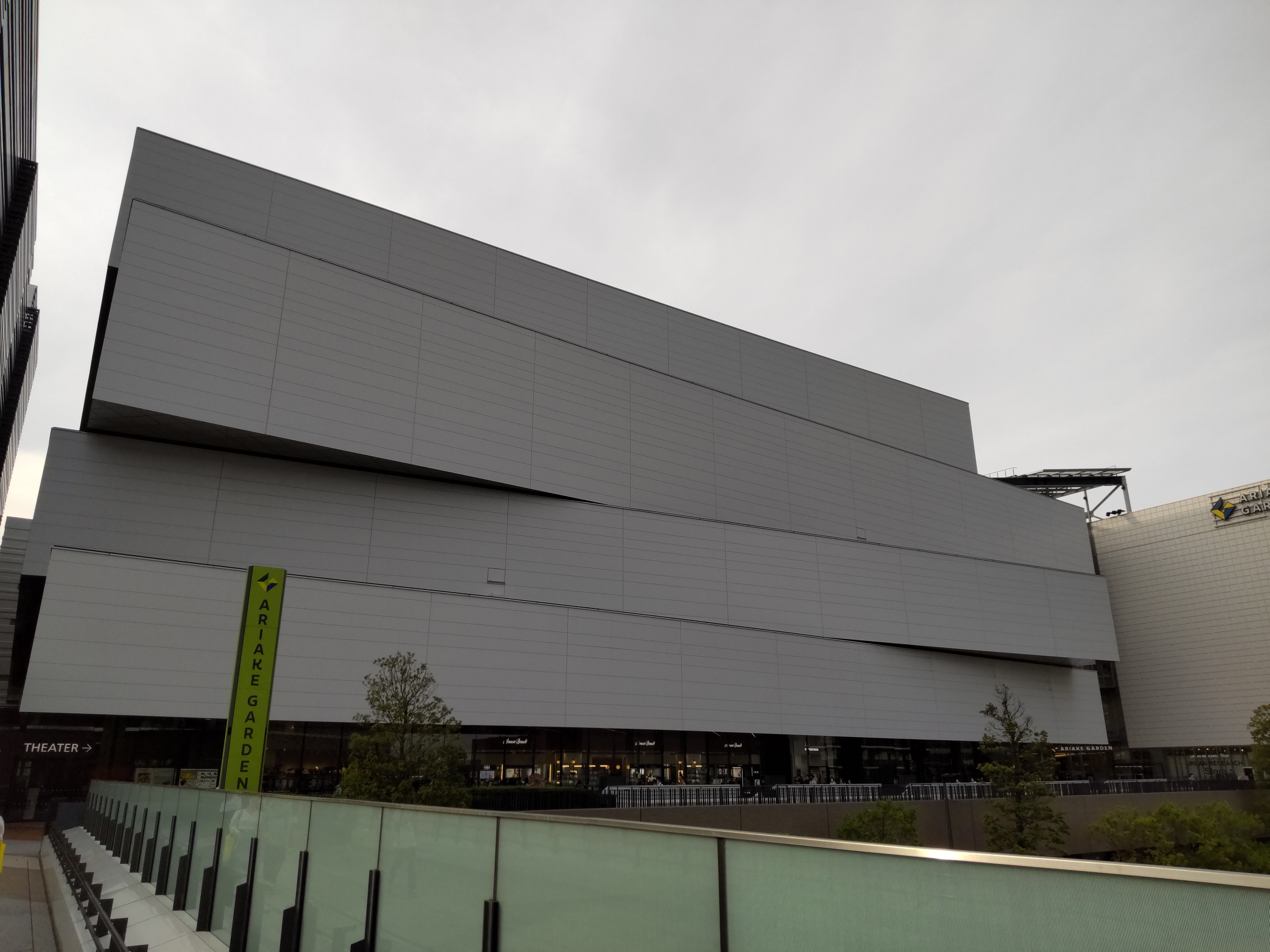
- Exterior of Tokyo Garden Theater from the South entrance
- Interactive map of Tokyo Garden Theater
- Location: 2 Chome-1-6 Ariake, Koto City, Tokyo 135-0063, Japan
- Coordinates: 35°38′17.6″N 139°47′31.7″E
- Owner: Sumitomo Fudosan Retail Management Co., Ltd.
- Capacity: 8,000

Construction
- Opened: June 17, 2020
- Architect: Teppei Fujiwara

Tokyo Garden Theater (東京ガーデンシアター, Tōkyō Gāden Shiatā) is a concert venue located in Koto, Tokyo, Japan. It was opened on June 17, 2020 and has hosted numerous artists since then.

== History ==
The building was part of a plan to build a special city at Ariake, called Tokyo Bay Ariake Complex Development Project, which included Ariake Garden mall, multiple hotels and Tokyo Garden Theater, as a prime location for concert events, with the same amount of attendance as Nippon Budokan. It was set to open on April 24, 2020, then pushed to May 15, 2020, then to June 17, both times due to COVID-19 pandemic. The original opening concert was planned to be held by Kikkawa Koji on May 3-5, 2020, but was postponed. The opening concert was an online festival by J-WAVE on July 17.

Promoted as the Ariake Event Hall, the auditorium features a boasting 8,000 seating in a fan-shape, much like K-Arena Yokohama. Even though it's newly-made, a great amount of notable artists have held shows here, including Alan Walker and Porter Robinson. EXILE vocalist Atsushi Satō held a two-night concert at the Tokyo Garden Theatre in August 2021 as part of EXILE Atsushi Live Tour 2021: Heart to Heart; the shows at this venue were released in a video format later on.

== Access ==
Tokyo Garden Theatre is a four minute walk from Ariake Station on the Yurikamone line.
