= Takeshiba Station =

Railway station in Tokyo, Japan

U03 Takeshiba 竹芝駅
- Takeshiba station, April 2026

General information
- Location: Minato, Tokyo; Japan
- Coordinates: 35.6540°N 139.7619°E
- Owner: Yurikamome, Inc.
- Platforms: 2 side platforms
- Tracks: 2
- Connections: Ferries to Izu Islands; Bus stop

Construction
- Structure type: Elevated
- Accessible: Yes

Other information
- Station code: U-03

History
- Opened: 1 November 1995

Passengers
- JFY23: 4,833 (daily)

Services
Preceding station	Yurikamome	Following station
Shiodome U02 towards Shimbashi	New Transit Yurikamome	Hinode U04 towards Toyosu
Location

Takeshiba station (Japanese: 竹芝駅, Hepburn: Takeshiba-eki) is a station on the Yurikamome Line in Minato, Tokyo, Japan. It is numbered "U-03". The station opened on 1 November 1995. The station has two elevated side platforms. This is the only station of the line that has two side platforms, as all the others stations have one (or two) island platforms.

== See also ==
- List of railway stations in Japan
