= Tokyo BRT =

Bus rapid transit network in Tokyo Bay

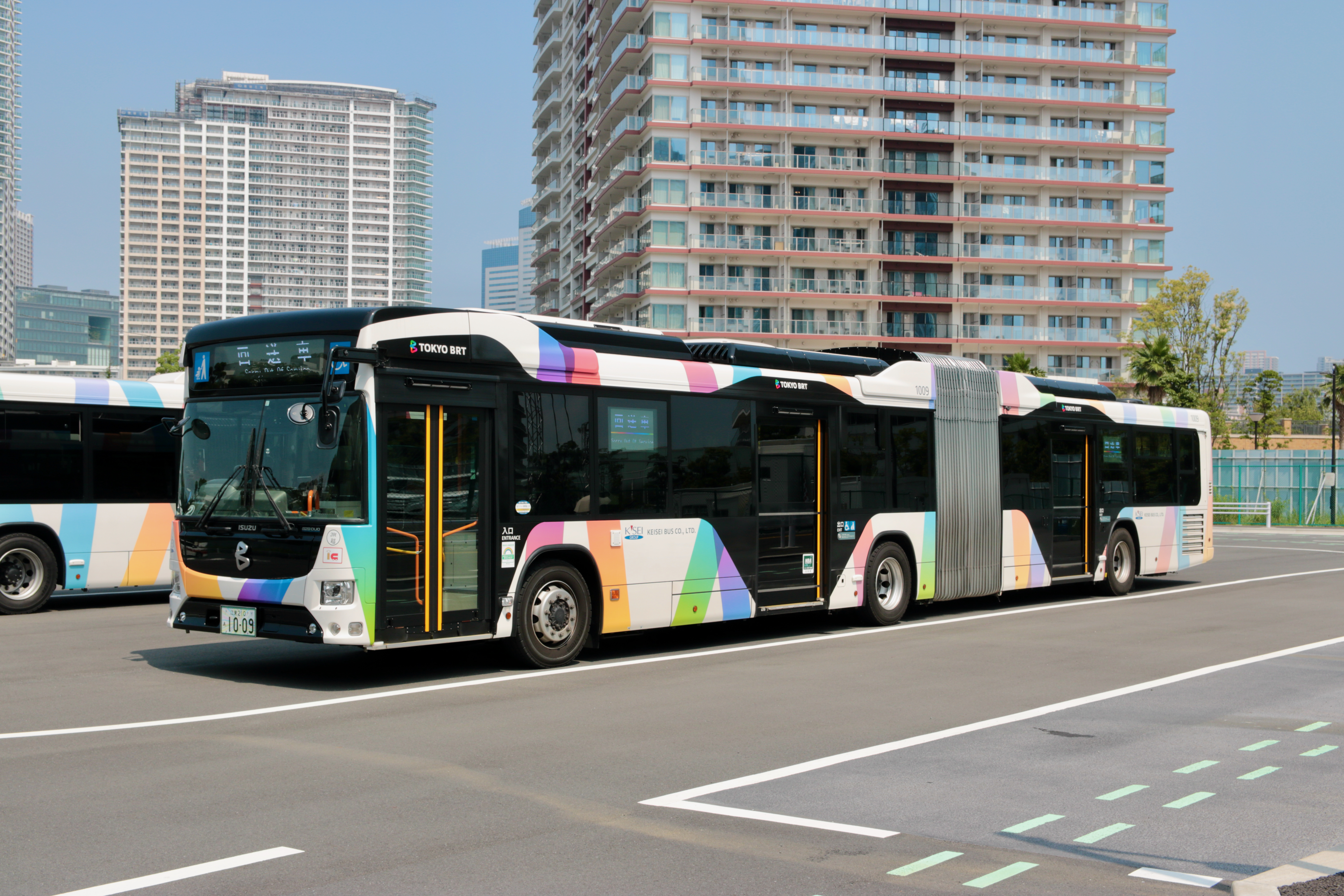
- Tokyo BRT Isuzu Erga Duo
- Parent: Keisei Bus
- Founded: 7 August 2019
- Headquarters: Edogawa-ku, Tokyo
- Service area: Tokyo
- Service type: Bus rapid transit
- Stations: 13
- Fleet: 9 buses
- Chief executive: Yoshiki Kinoshita (Keisei Bus managing director)
- Website: Tokyo BRT (in English)
System map
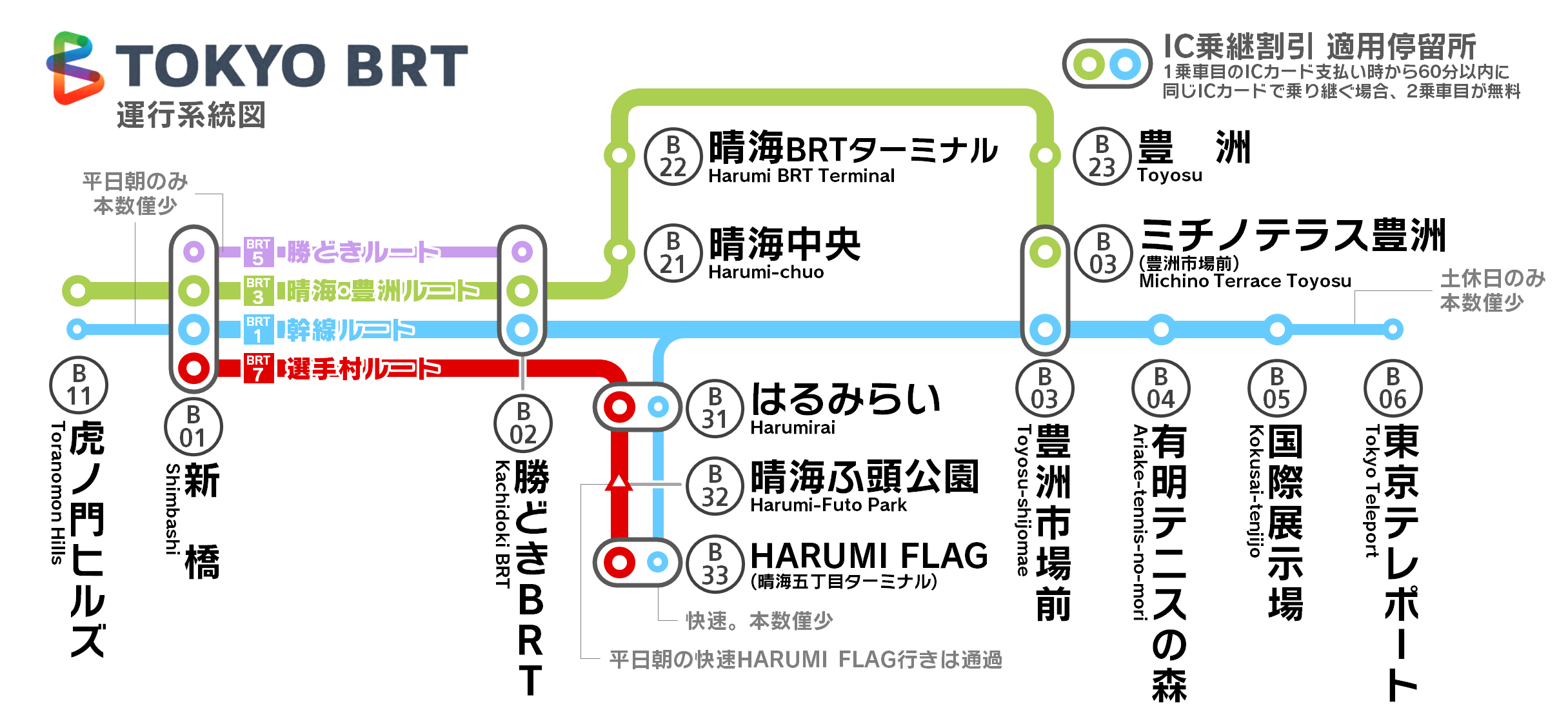

The Tokyo BRT (東京BRT) is a bus rapid transit system operated by Keisei Bus that was established on 8 July 2019. Tokyo BRT buses are parked at a building owned by Tokyo BRT and located in Shinonome, Kōtō. The network's two bases—Okuto Office and Shinonome Barn—are also used by Keisei Bus.

== Overview ==
The Tokyo BRT name was selected after soliciting possible names from the public between August and September 2018. The company also asked for public opinion regarding three possible designs.

Development in the New Tokyo Waterfront district was needed as a result of the closure of Tsukiji Market (with the simultaneous opening of Toyosu Market) as well as the development of the Olympic Village for the 2020 Summer Olympics. Improvements in public transportation in the Kachidoki area of Harumi were also needed due to lack of rail access.

== Routes ==
In 2020, the route was partially opened to traffic between Toranomon Hills and the Harumi BRT Terminal for passengers who live or work in the New Tokyo Waterfront district. Extensions to Ginza Station and Tokyo Station (from the Shimbashi side) and Tokyo International Cruise Terminal Station (from the Harumi side) are under consideration.

Since 1 April 2023, new routes that connect Shimbashi Station with Tokyo Teleport Station, and Shimbashi Station with Shijō-mae Station via Toyosu Station respectively, have started.

=== Demonstration service ===
The Tokyo BRT was planned to be rolled out in three phases: preliminary demonstration, secondary demonstration, and complete service. For demonstrations, there would be 6 buses during peak hours to service 450 people per hour, and 4 buses during regular hours to service 300 people per hour.

During the preliminary stage of demonstration, the buses ran one line:

- Toranomon Hills Station (B11) – Shimbashi Station (B01) – Kachidoki BRT (B02) – Harumi BRT Terminal (B22)

During the secondary stage of demonstration, the buses ran three lines:

- Main Road Line: Toranomon Hills Station (B11) – Shimbashi Station (B01) – Kachidoki BRT (B02) – Shijo-mae Station (B03) – Ariake-Tennis-no-mori Station (B04) – Kokusai-Tenjijo Station (B05) – Tokyo Teleport Station (B06)
- Harumi-Toyosu Line: Toranomon Hills Station (B11) – Shimbashi Station (B01) – Kachidoki BRT (B02) – Harumi Chūō (B21) – Harumi BRT Terminal (B22)
- Kachidoki Line: Shimbashi (B01) – Kachidoki BRT (B02)

=== Complete service ===
For complete service, there are 20 buses during peak hours to service 2000 people per hour, and 12 buses during regular hours to service 1200 people per hour.

During complete service, the buses will run four lines:

- Main Road Line: Toranomon Hills Station (B11) – Shimbashi Station (B01) – Kachidoki BRT (B02) – Shijo-mae Station (B03) – Ariake-Tennis-no-mori Station (B04) – Kokusai-Tenjijo Station (B05) – Tokyo Teleport Station (B06)
- Harumi-Toyosu Line: Toranomon Hills Station (B11) – Shimbashi Station (B01) – Kachidoki BRT (B02) – Harumi Chūō (B21) – Harumi BRT Terminal (B22)
- Kachidoki Line: Shimbashi (B01) – Kachidoki BRT (B02)
- Olympic Village Line: Shimbashi Station (B01) – Kachidoki BRT (B02) – 〈Harumi Gochōme〉(B31, B32, B33: stops, facilities and new route are in consideration)

=== List of bus stops ===
A hyphen denotes a stop that a route passes but does not service.

Depot number	Depot name	Preliminary demonstration	Secondary demonstration and complete service			Complete service	Location
Depot number	Depot name	Preliminary demonstration	Main	Harumi-Toyosu	Kachidoki	Senshumura	Location
B11	Toranomon Hills	●	●	●		●	Minato
B01	Shimbashi	●	●	●	●	●	Minato
B02	Kachidoki BRT	●	●	●	●	●	Chuo
B31	Harumi 5-chome	-	-	-		●	Chuo
B32	Harumi 5-chome	-	-	-		●	Chuo
B33	Harumi 5-chome	-	-	-		●	Chuo
B21	Harumi Chuo	-	-	●			Chuo
B22	Harumi BRT Bus Terminal	●	-	●			Chuo
B23	Toyosu Station		-	●			Koto
B03	Toyosu Shijo mae		●	●			Koto
B04	Ariake Tennis no Mori		●				Koto
B05	Kokusai-Tenjijō		●				Koto
B06	Tokyo Teleport		●				Koto

== Fare ==
Fares are paid with cash or using a Suica or Pasmo smart card.

Normal fares:

- Adults: ¥220
- Children: ¥110

One-day pass:

- Adults: ¥500
- Children: ¥250

Commuter passes:

- Commuters: ¥9000 for 1 month, ¥26000 for 3 months, ¥50000 for 6 months
- Students: ¥6300 for 1 month, ¥18200 for 3 months, ¥35000 for 6 months
- Children: ¥3150 for 1 month, ¥9100 for 3 months, ¥17500 for 6 months

== Vehicles ==
The Tokyo BRT uses three types of buses: the Toyota Sora, the Isuzu Erga, and the Isuzu Erga Duo.

== Timeline ==
- August 2014 – Decided on basic policy and invited entries for business collaborators
- October 2014 – Narrowed potential business collaborators down to two: Keisei Bus and Toei Bus
- November 2014 – Establishment of Toshin to Rinkaifuku Toshin to wo Musubu BRT Kyōgi-kai (都心と臨海副都心とを結ぶBRT協議会) council
- April 2015 – Announcement of Toshin to Rinkaifuku Toshin to wo Musubu BRT Kihon Keikaku (都心と臨海副都心とを結ぶBRT基本計画) basic plan
- September 2015 – Keisei Bus selected as business collaborator
- April 2016 – Announcement of Toshin to Rinkaifuku Toshin to wo Musubu BRT Jigyō Keikaku (都心と臨海副都心とを結ぶBRT事業計画) business plan
- 23 June 2016 – Decided on Tōkyō Rinkai-bu Chiiki Kōkyō Kōtsūmō Keisei Keikaku (東京臨海部地域公共交通網形成計画) formation plan
- 8 July 2019 – Establishment of Tokyo BRT company as a kabushiki gaisha
- 14 February 2020 – Demonstration service planned to start on May 24
- 12 May 2020 – Announced postponement of demonstration service due to COVID-19
- 1 October 2020 – Started preliminary demonstration service
- 2021 – Secondary demonstration service planned to start
- 2022 – Complete service planned to start

== See also ==
- Keisei Group
  - Keisei Bus Tokyo
  - Kantō Railway(The former Kantetsu Green Bus), which operates a service similar to the Tokyo BRT.
