= Aomi =

Area in Kōtō, Tokyo, Japan

Coordinates: 35°37′00″N 139°47′01″E

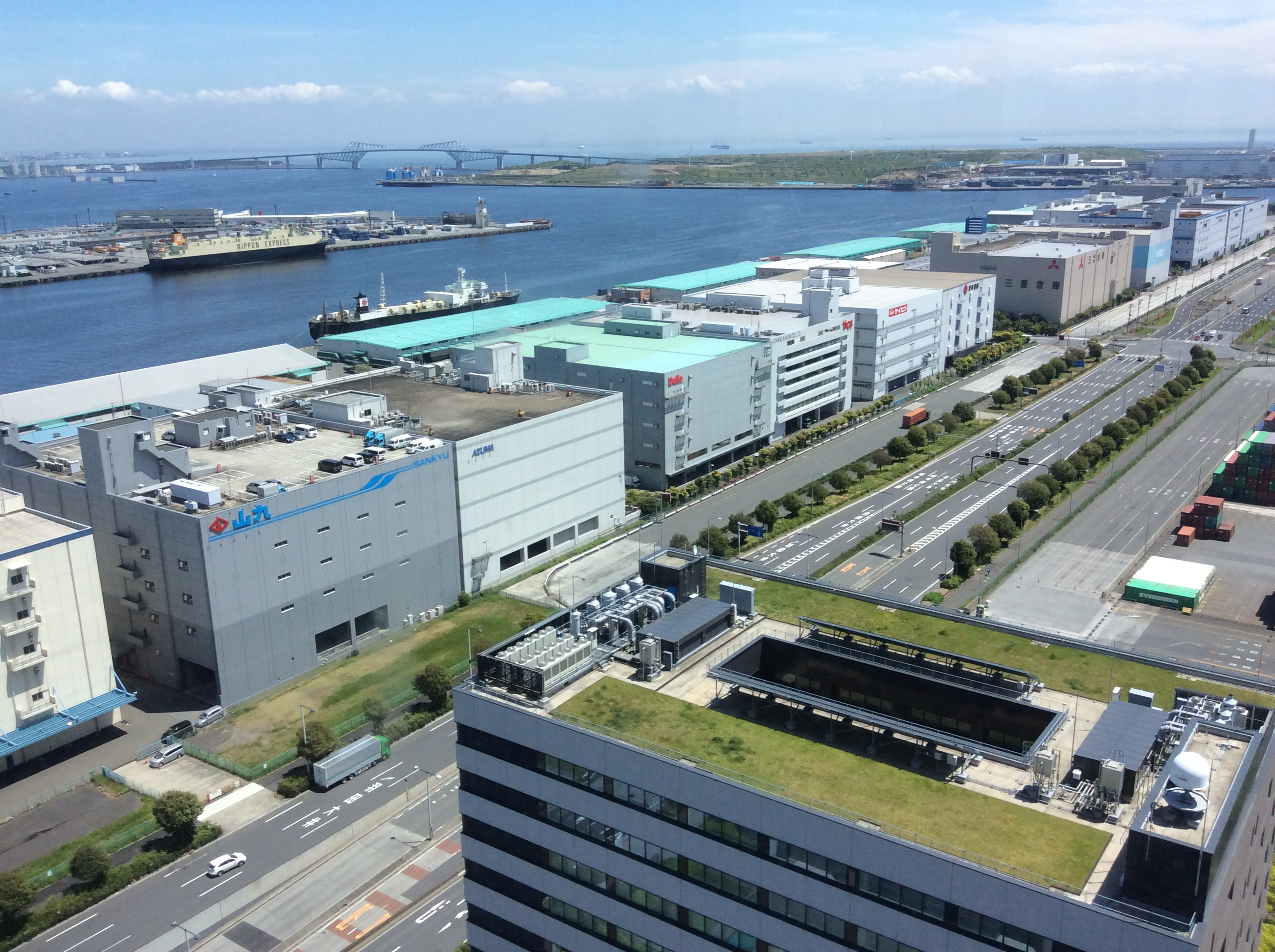
View of Aomi

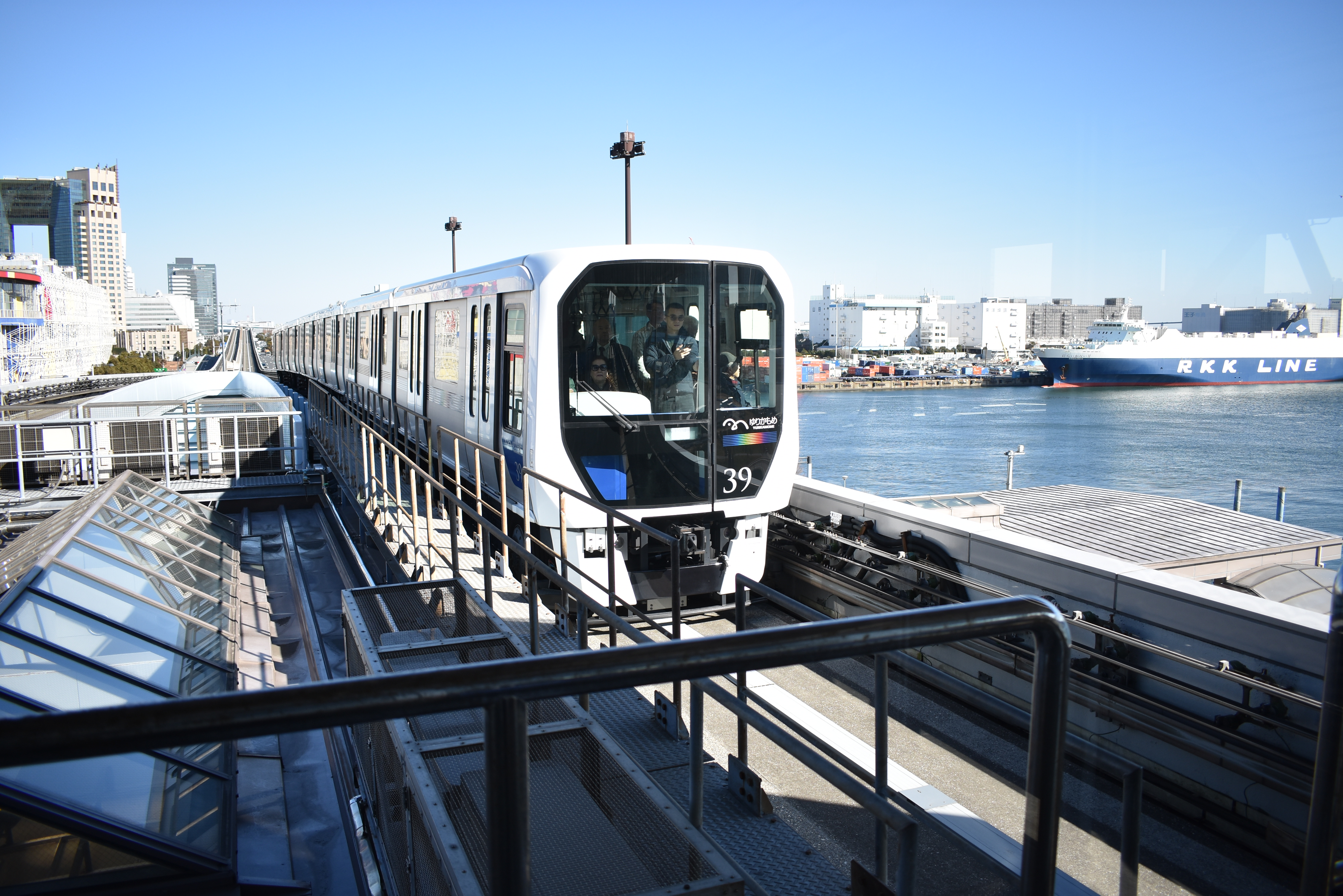
Aomi Station

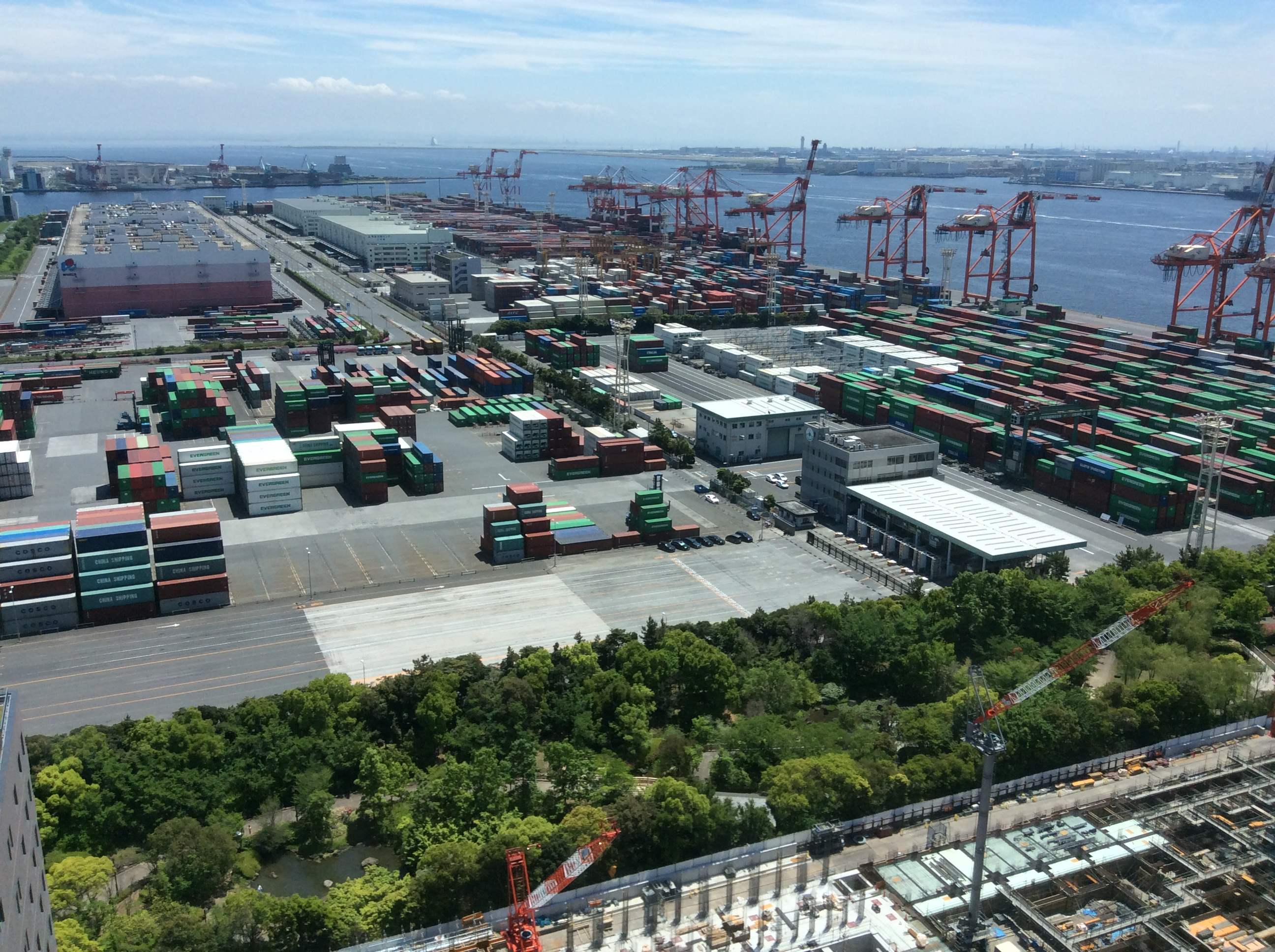
Container terminal in Aomi

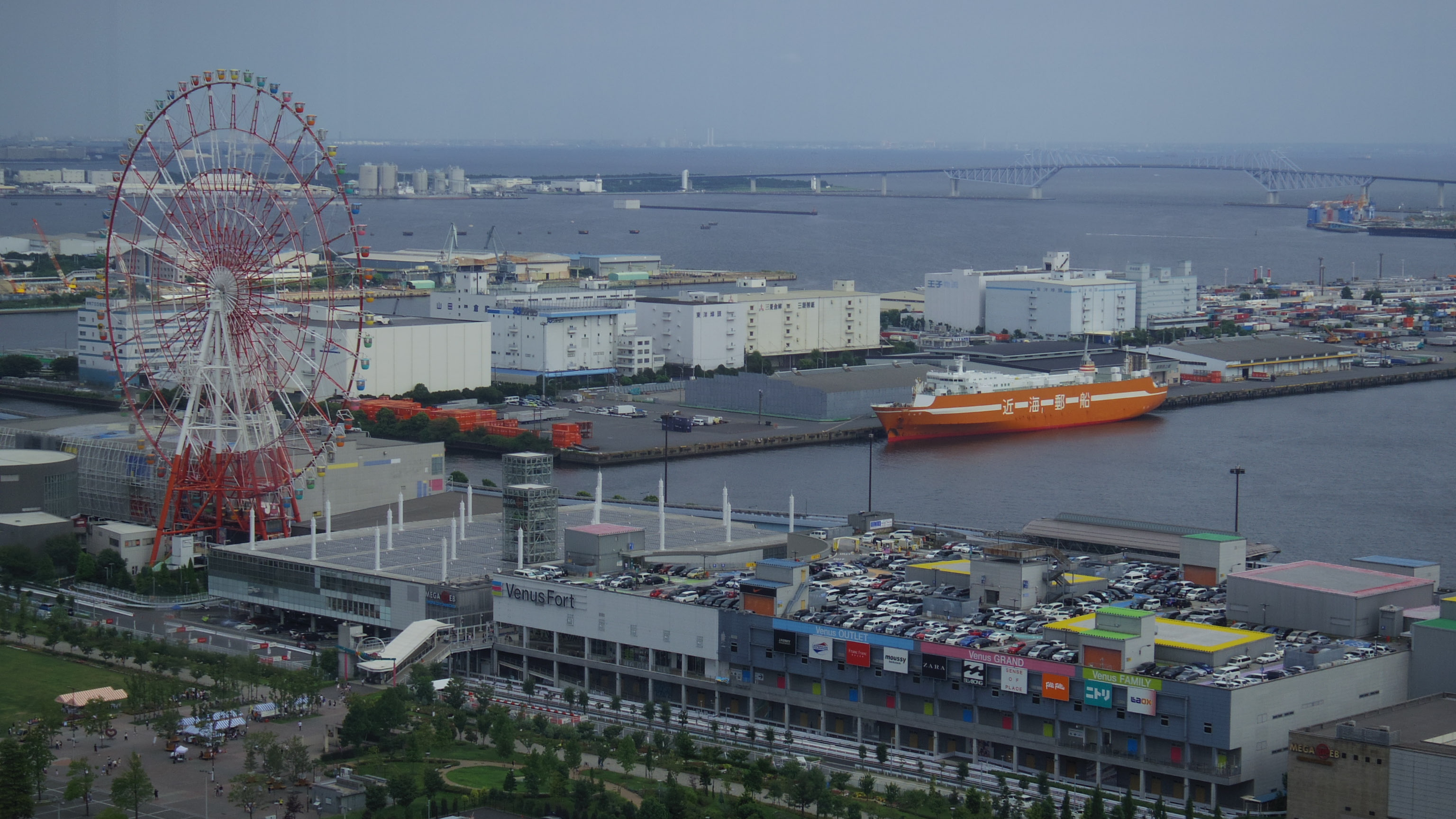
Palette Town in Aomi

Aomi (青海) is an area in Kōtō, Tokyo, Japan. Its subdivisions consist of Aomi 1, 2, 3 and 4 chome. Aomi is part of Tokyo Bay Landfill #13 and Tokyo Rinkai Satellite City Center.

Many important facilities are located in Aomi, such as the Miraikan scientific museum, and National Institute of Technology. It was also formerly home to Palette Town (which included VenusFort shopping mall, the 115-metre (377 ft) Daikanransha Ferris wheel, Zepp Tokyo music hall, Megaweb - the exhibition hall of Toyota). There is a large seaport facility area of the Port of Tokyo (Aomi dock) and Aomi container terminal. More than a half of the Aomi 2 chome area is dedicated to the port and cargo storage.

The land of whole Aomi area had been reclaimed from the sea after 1946, thus all trees have been planted and there are no large animals except for stray cats. Several kinds of wild birds and fishes can be observed.

== Education ==
Koto Ward Board of Education operates public elementary and junior high schools.

Ariake Nishi Gakuen (有明西学園) is the zoned public elementary school, and the zoned public junior high school.

== Culture ==
The Toyota Arena Tokyo was opened in September 2025 and became the home stadium of basketball team Alvark Tokyo. It has a capacity of around 10 thousand people.
