= Shijō-mae Station =

Railway station in Tokyo, Japan

Coordinates: 35.6459°N 139.7854°E

U14 Shijō-mae Station 市場前駅
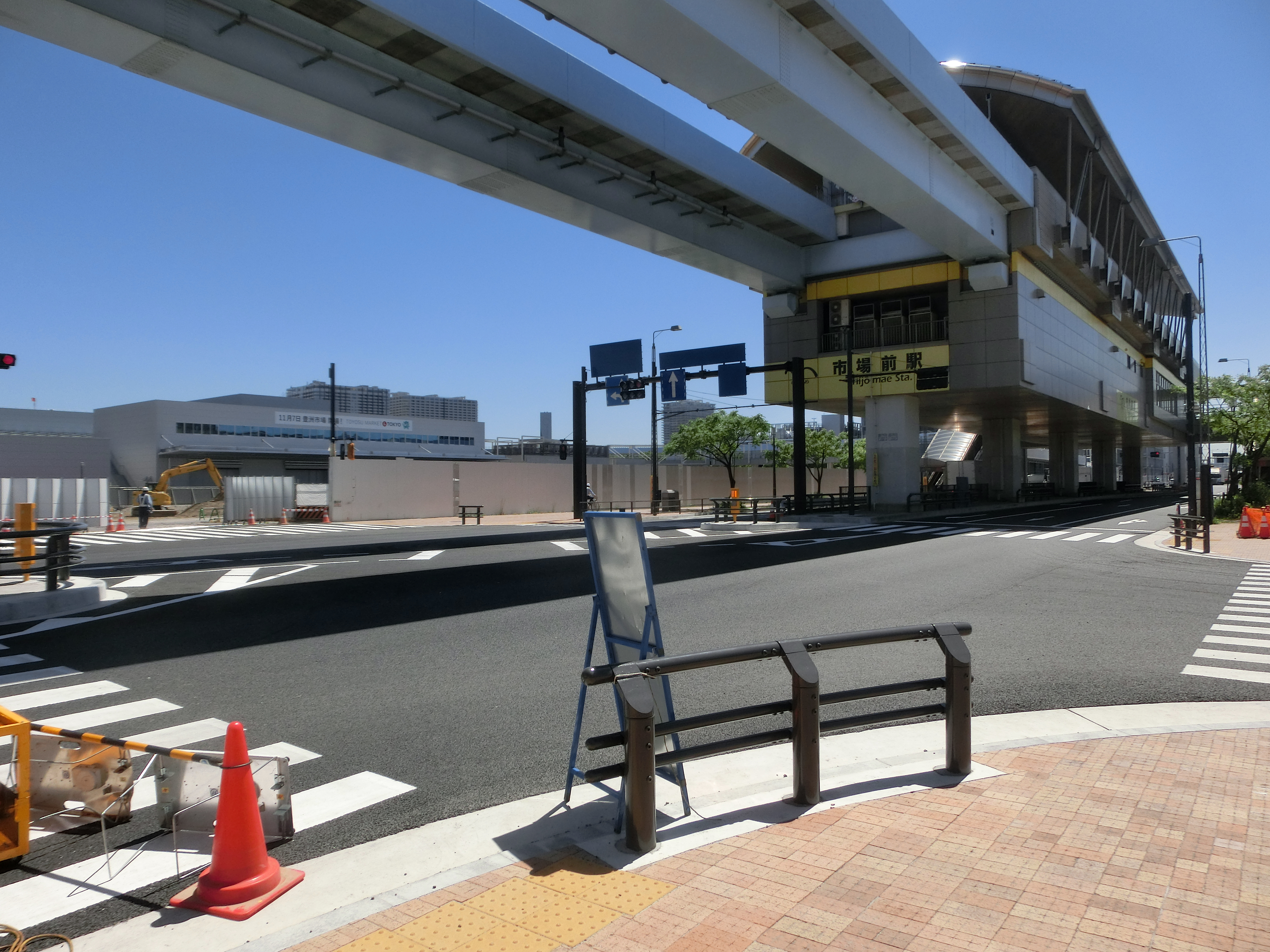
- Shijō-mae Station in May 2016

General information
- Location: Kōtō, Tokyo; Japan
- Operator: Yurikamome, Inc.
- Line: Yurikamome
- Distance: 13.5 km from Shimbashi
- Platforms: 1 island platform
- Tracks: 2

Construction
- Structure type: Elevated

Other information
- Station code: U-14
- Website: www.yurikamome.co.jp

History
- Opened: 27 March 2006

Passengers
- FY2023: 13,997 (daily)

Services
Preceding station	Yurikamome	Following station
Ariake-Tennis-no-mori U13 towards Shimbashi	New Transit Yurikamome	Shin-toyosu U15 towards Toyosu
Location

Shijō-mae Station (Japanese: 市場前駅, Hepburn: Shijōmae-eki; lit. 'In front of the market station') is a station on the Yurikamome Line in Kōtō, Tokyo, Japan. The station is numbered "U-14".

== Lines ==
Shijō-mae Station is served by the 14.7 km Yurikamome automated guideway transit line between Shimbashi and Toyosu, and is located 13.5 km from the starting point of the line at Shimbashi.

== Station layout ==
The station consists of an elevated island platform serving two tracks.

=== Platforms ===
1	Yurikamome	for Toyosu
2	Yurikamome	for Daiba and Shimbashi

== History ==
The station opened on 27 March 2006. The station's name means "In Front of the Market" after the upcoming Toyosu Market (豊洲市場, Toyosu-shijō) which was set to replace the Tsukiji fish market. However, numerous delays meant that Toyosu Market did not actually commence operations until 2018, 12 years after the station.

== Passenger statistics ==
During FY2023, the station was used on average by 13,997 passengers daily. (Note: Data published by the Ministry of Land, Infrastructure, Transport and Tourism state the number of passengers boarding and disembarking by station in a given year. FY2023 covers the period from 1 April 2023 to 31 March 2024. Data published by individual railways directly may state the number boarding only.)

== Surrounding area ==
- Toyosu Market

== See also ==
- List of railway stations in Japan
