= Toyota Arena Tokyo =

Indoor arena in Koto, Tokyo, Japan

Coordinates: 35.626389°N 139.783056°E

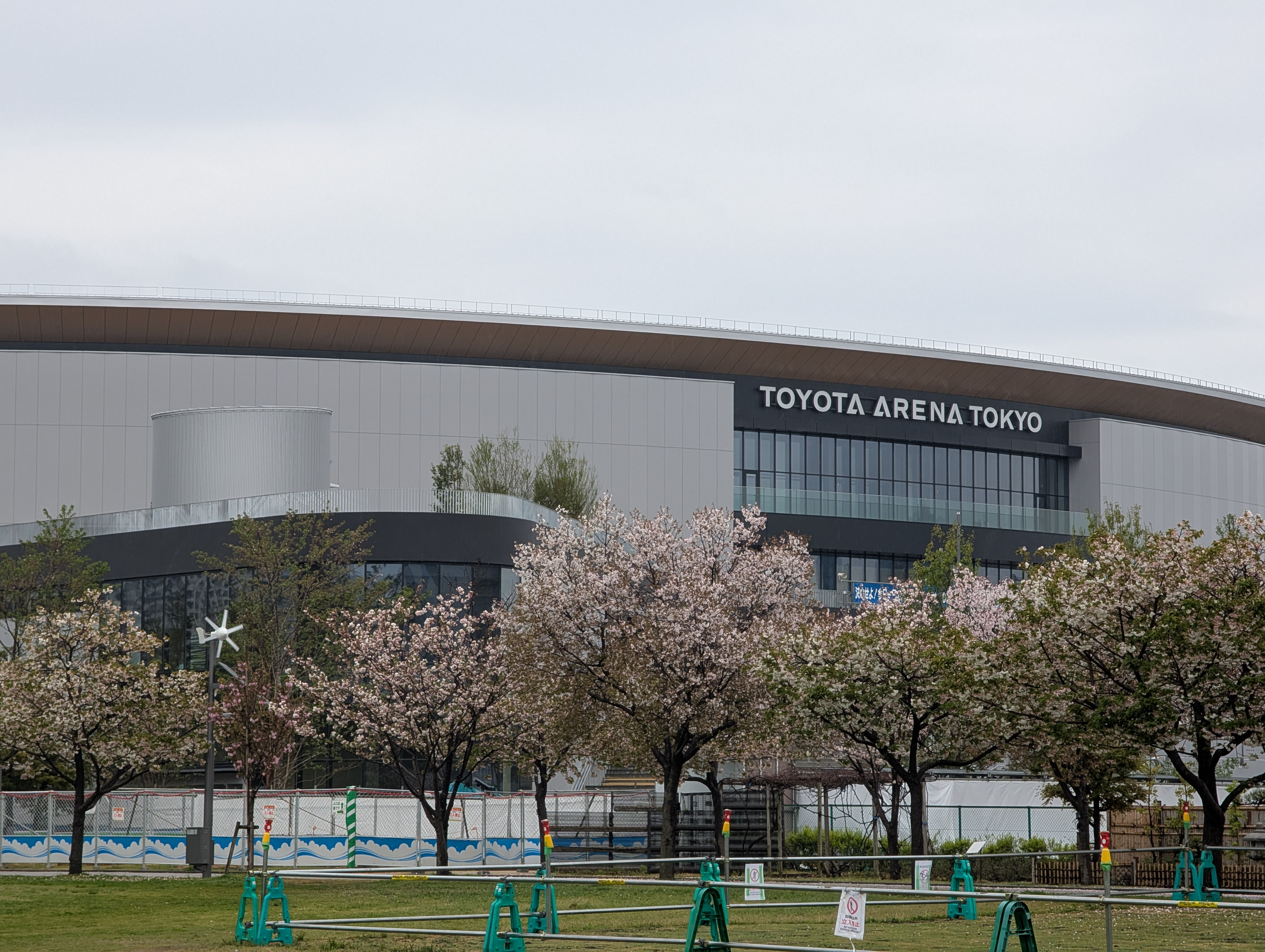
- Toyota Arena Tokyo in 2025
- Interactive map of Toyota Arena Tokyo
- Address: 1-3-1 Aomi, Koto-ku; Tokyo; Japan
- Owner: Toyota Motor Corporation (land); Toyota Fudosan (building)
- Operator: Toyota Alvark Tokyo (designated manager)
- Capacity: 11,000
- Public transit: Aomi Station; Tokyo Teleport Station

Construction
- Opened: October 3, 2025

Tenants
- Alvark Tokyo (B.League) (2025–present); Sun Rockers Shibuya (2026–present); D.League (2025–present)

Website
- Official website

Toyota Arena Tokyo (stylized in all caps) is a multi-purpose indoor arena located in the Aomi district of Kōtō Ward, Tokyo, Japan. Built on the former site of Palette Town, the arena serves as a prominent sports and entertainment venue in the Tokyo waterfront.

== History ==
In late March 2020, Toyota Group's Towa Real Estate (now Toyota Fudosan) announced a proposal to construct a large-scale, multi-purpose arena with a capacity of approximately 10,000 spectators on the Aomi ST plot, where the Palette Town entertainment complex had stood until its closing in 2022. It was later reported that Toyota Motor Corporation, Towa Real Estate, Mori Building, and the Tokyo Metropolitan Government were collaborating on a redevelopment project aimed at an opening target of 2025.

In August 2022, Toyota Motor Corporation, Toyota Fudosan, and Toyota Alvark Tokyo officially launched the "Tokyo A-Arena Project", initially with the temporary name "Tokyo A-Arena". Construction commenced in July 2023, and the permanent name "Toyota Arena Tokyo" was formally announced in September 2023.

The facility officially opened on October 3, 2025. The venue serves as the primary home arena for the professional B.League basketball team, Alvark Tokyo, starting from the 2025–26 season. Fellow B.League team Sun Rockers Shibuya will also utilize the arena as a co-home venue starting with the 2026–27 season. Additionally, the SV.League volleyball club, Tokyo Great Bears, schedules select home games at the venue.

The arena hosted its first concert on October 11–12, a week after its opening, of pop rock band Official Hige Dandism.

On December 13–14, 2025, rock band Alexandros performed their 15th anniversary "VIP Party '25" concerts at the arena.

== Facilities ==
=== Main arena ===
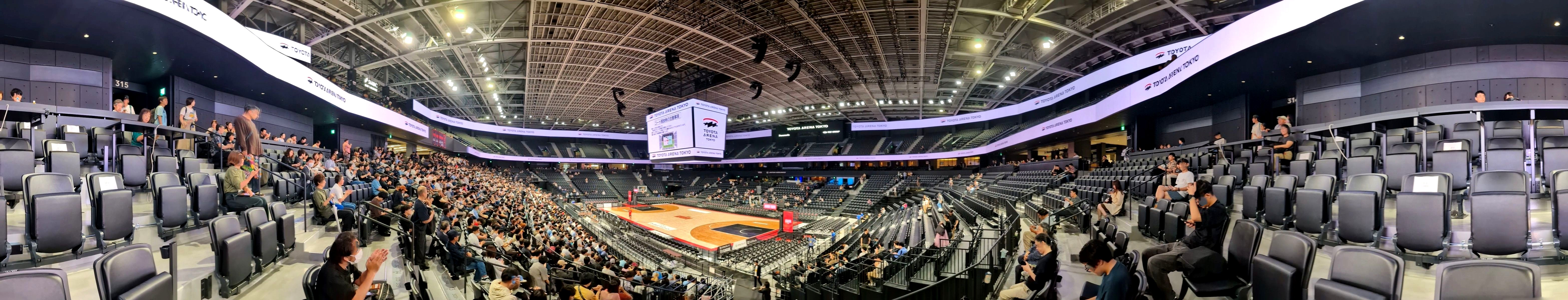
Main arena

In contrast to the U-shaped seating design common in indoor arenas to accommodate concert stages, Toyota Arena Tokyo features an oval layout designed to maximize spectator immersion and optimal lines of sight for sports tracking.

The stadium's visual technologies include a box-shaped center-hung scoreboard structure with angled displays for clear viewing from all stands. It also features a dual-tier ribbon display setup wrapping around the interior; the upper tier stands at approximately 2 meters tall, making it one of the largest ribbon displays in Japan.
