= Tokyo International Cruise Terminal Station =

Railway station in Tokyo, Japan

Coordinates: 35.6213°N 139.7731°E

U08 Tokyo International Cruise Terminal Station 東京国際クルーズターミナル駅
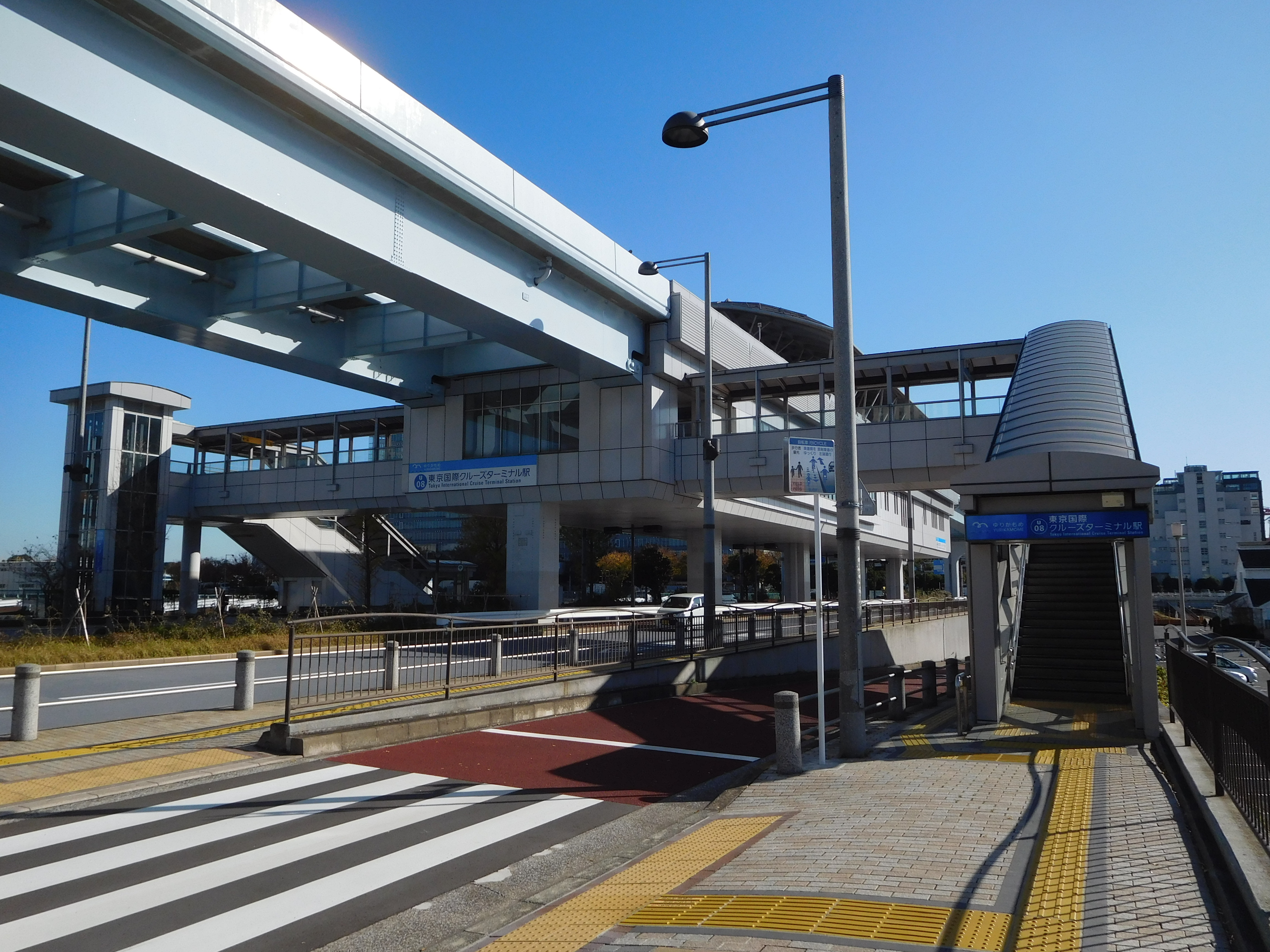
- The station entrance in 2019

General information
- Location: Kōtō, Tokyo; Japan
- Operator: Yurikamome, Inc.
- Line: Yurikamome
- Connections: Bus stop

Other information
- Station code: U-08

History
- Opened: 1 November 1995

Passengers
- FY2023: 2,963 (daily)

Services
Preceding station	Yurikamome	Following station
Daiba U07 towards Shimbashi	New Transit Yurikamome	Telecom Center U09 towards Toyosu
Location

Tokyo International Cruise Terminal Station (東京国際クルーズターミナル駅, Tōkyō Kokusai Kurūzu Tāminaru-eki) is a railway station on the Yurikamome Line in Kōtō, Tokyo, Japan. It is assigned station number "U-08".

The station consists of a single elevated island platform.

The station opened on 1 November 1995 as Fune-no-kagakukan Station (船の科学館駅, Fune-no-kagakukan-eki; lit. "Museum of Maritime Science Station"). On 16 March 2019, the station was renamed to its present name.

== Surrounding area ==
- Tokyo International Cruise Terminal
- Museum of Maritime Science
- Shiokaze Park
- Sōya – museum ship
