= Yurikamome =

Automated guideway transit line in Tokyo, Japan

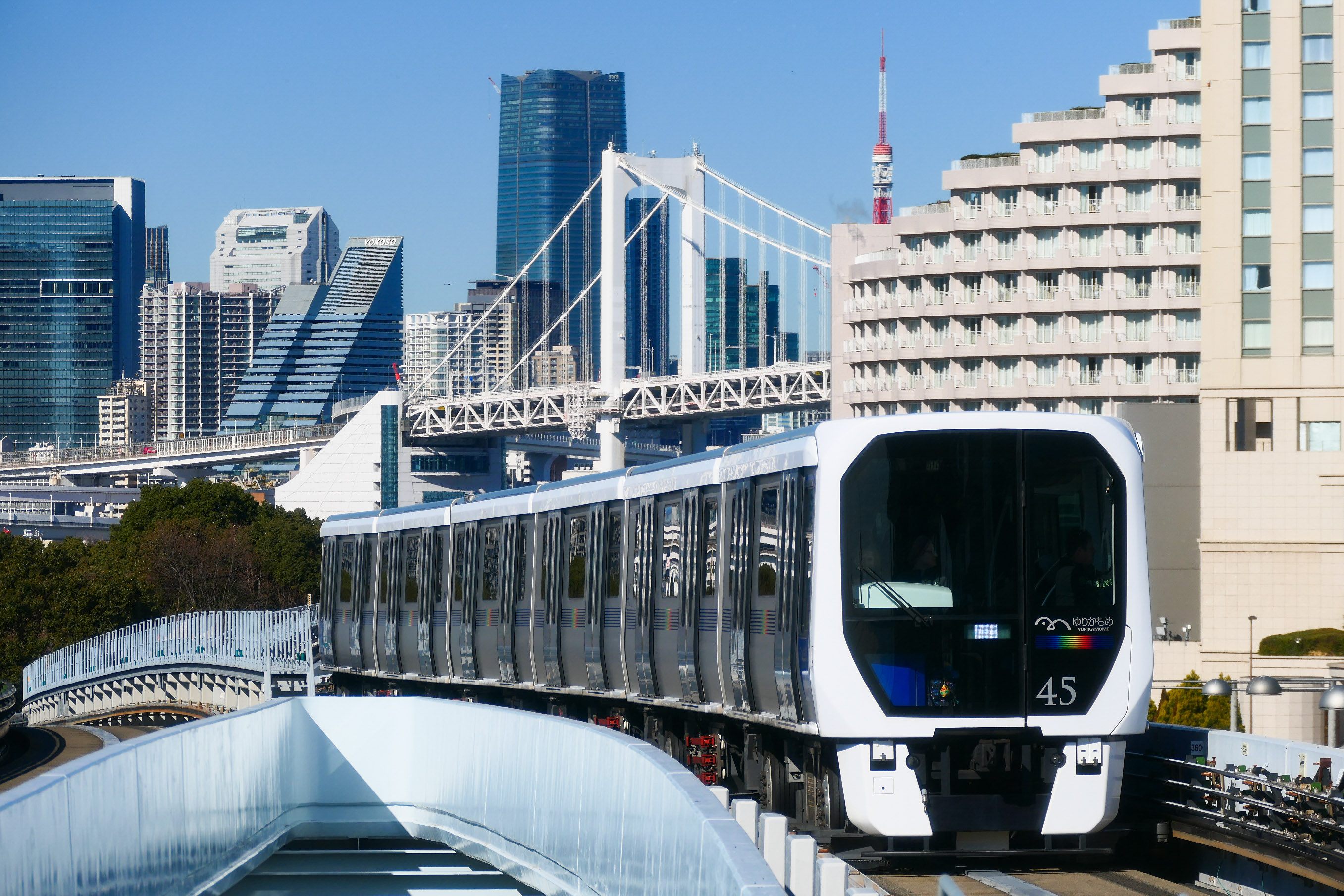
- 7300 series approaching the Tokyo International Cruise Terminal Station at Kōtō, January 2025

Overview
- Other name: Tokyo Waterfront New Transit Waterfront Line
- Native name: 新交通ゆりかもめ
- Owner: Yurikamome, Inc. (direct); Tokyo Rinkai Holdings, Inc. (indirect); Tokyo Metropolitan Government (ultimate)
- Locale: Tokyo, Japan
- Termini: Shimbashi; Toyosu
- Stations: 16
- Website: yurikamome.co.jp

Service
- Type: Automated guideway transit
- Operator(s): Yurikamome, Inc.
- Depot: Ariake
- Rolling stock: 7300 series, 7500 series (6-car trains)
- Daily ridership: 125,000 (FY 2023)

History
- Opened: 1 November 1995; 31 years ago

Technical
- Line length: 14.7 km (9.1 mi)
- Num of tracks: 2
- Electrification: Conductor rails, 600 V 50 Hz 3φ AC
- Operating speed: 60 km/h (37 mph)
Route map

New Transit Yurikamome, (Note: Japanese: 新交通ゆりかもめ, Hepburn: Shinkōtsū Yurikamome) also known as the Tokyo Waterfront New Transit Waterfront Line, (Note: 東京臨海新交通臨海線, Tōkyō Rinkai Shinkōtsū Rinkai-sen) is an automated guideway transit service in Tokyo. It connects Shimbashi to Toyosu via the artificial island of Odaiba, a corridor in which it competes with the Rinkai Line. It is operated by Yurikamome, Inc., a third-sector subsidiary of Tokyo Rinkai Holdings, Inc. (TRHC), which itself is funded by the Tokyo Metropolitan Government, the largest shareholder of TRHC.

The line is named after the black-headed gull (yurikamome in Japanese), a common denizen of Tokyo Bay and the official metropolitan bird.

== History ==
The line was one of two constructed to transport people into the Rinkai subcenter, the other being the Rinkai Line. The Rinkai subcenter was planned to be the seventh subcenter of Tokyo as far back as 1979. In April 1989, the subcenter was projected to have 60,000 residents and 110,000 workers by the start of the 21st century. This plan was revised following the collapse of the Japanese asset price bubble. The openings of the Yurikamome and the Rinkai Line in 1995 and 1996 were scheduled to be completed by the start of the World City Expo in 1996. However, the expo was cancelled by Yukio Aoshima in April 1995. On 1 November 1995, the section between Shimbashi and Ariake opened, using a temporary Shimbashi station. In the first few months of operation, ridership hovered around 27,000 passengers per day.

In 1996, the Tokyo Metropolitan Government re-zoned Odaiba from purely business and residential to also permit entertainment zones. The island provided Tokyo with a livable seaside area, and within one year, ridership doubled to 60,000. As more restaurants, shopping malls, exhibition centers, and museums opened, traffic continued to grow. On 22 March 2001, the current Shimbashi Station opened, and the temporary station closed. Shiodome Station opened on 2 November 2002. On 27 March 2006, the section between Ariake and Toyosu opened, and the stations adopted letter-and-number codes based on Tokyo Metro. The letter "U" is used as the symbol for station numbers rather than "Y" for Yurikamome as this letter is already used for the Tokyo Metro Yūrakuchō Line.

A plan to extend the line from Toyosu to Kachidoki Station had existed since at least 2000, although it was not included in the 2016 list of considered transit routes.

== Stations ==
No.	Station	Distance in km (mi)		Transfers	Location
No.	Station	Between stations	Total	Transfers	Location
U01	Shimbashi 新橋	—N/a	0 (0)	Tōkaidō Line (JT02); Yamanote Line (JY29); Keihin–Tōhoku Line (JK24); Yokosuka Line (JO18); Ginza Line (G-08); Asakusa Line (A-10)	Minato
U02	Shiodome 汐留	0.4 (0.25)	0.4 (0.25)	Ōedo Line (E-19)	Minato
U03	Takeshiba 竹芝	1.2 (0.75)	1.6 (0.99)	Ferries to Izu Islands	Minato
U04	Hinode 日の出	0.6 (0.37)	2.2 (1.4)		Minato
U05	Shibaura-futō 芝浦ふ頭	0.9 (0.56)	3.1 (1.9)		Minato
Rainbow Bridge crossing					Minato
U06	Odaiba-kaihinkōen お台場海浜公園	3.9 (2.4)	7.0 (4.3)	Rinkai Line (Tokyo Teleport: R-04)	Minato
U07	Daiba 台場	0.8 (0.50)	7.8 (4.8)		Minato
U08	Tokyo International Cruise Terminal 東京国際クルーズターミナル	0.6 (0.37)	8.4 (5.2)	Tokyo International Cruise Terminal	Kōtō
U09	Telecom Center テレコムセンター	0.8 (0.50)	9.2 (5.7)		Kōtō
U10	Aomi 青海	1.0 (0.62)	10.2 (6.3)	Rinkai Line (Tokyo Teleport: R-04)	Kōtō
U11	Tokyo Big Sight 東京ビッグサイト	1.1 (0.68)	11.3 (7.0)		Kōtō
U12	Ariake 有明	0.7 (0.43)	12.0 (7.5)	Rinkai Line (Kokusai-Tenjijō: R-03); Tokyo BRT (Kokusai-Tenjijō: B-05)	Kōtō
U13	Ariake-Tennis-no-mori 有明テニスの森	0.7 (0.43)	12.7 (7.9)		Kōtō
U14	Shijō-mae 市場前	0.8 (0.50)	13.5 (8.4)		Kōtō
U15	Shin-toyosu 新豊洲	0.5 (0.31)	14.0 (8.7)		Kōtō
U16	Toyosu 豊洲	0.7 (0.43)	14.7 (9.1)	Yūrakuchō Line (Y-22)	Kōtō

== Rolling stock ==
The Yurikamome is Tokyo's first fully automated and driverless transit system, controlled entirely by computers. However, the line is not the first fully driverless transit line in Japan, as the Nagoya Municipal Subway tested such systems in 1960, driverless technology was used during Expo '70 and Kobe's automated Port Island Line opened in 1981.

The line uses Mitsubishi Heavy Industries rubber-tired "Crystal Mover" technology. The trains run on rubber-tired wheels along an elevated concrete track guided by the side walls.

When the line first opened, service was operated by a fleet of 13 trainsets, the 7000 series, all formed as six-car sets. These cars had mostly transverse seats (oriented across the width of the car, with passengers seated facing forward or backward in the direction of travel), with a single wide door at each entrance. The fleet of 7000 series trainsets grew to 18 as the popularity of the line increased, necessitating more frequent trains.

A fleet of eight 7200 series trains was introduced in February 1999. These trains were based on the 7000 series and had a similar external appearance, but had a mix of transverse and longitudinal seating (bench seats installed along the side walls of the car) to provide additional standing room, and used AC motors rather than the DC motors used on the 7000 series.

=== 7300 series ===
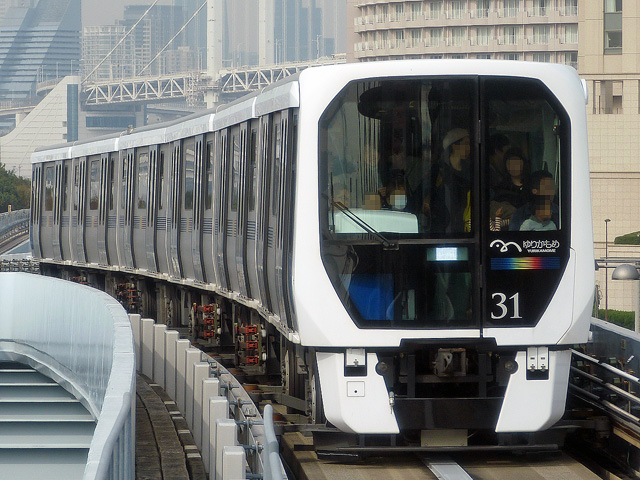
7300 series set 31 in November 2018

A new fleet of 18 7300 series trains to replace the original 7000 series was delivered starting in October 2013. These trains featured an entirely new exterior design with double doors at each entrance. On the inside, the trains had all longitudinal seating, but with higher backs and a bucket shape to hold passengers in place against lateral shaking. The trains also featured areas with designated priority seats and wheelchair spaces with no fold-down seats. They featured LCD monitors with station information in several languages, added overhead luggage racks, and brighter, energy-efficient LED lighting. The trains were placed into revenue service on January 18, 2014, with the remainder of the 7000 series fleet retired by early 2016.

Eighteen 7300 series sets (31 to 48) are in service, formed as six-car sets as follows.

Car No.	1	2	3	4	5	6
Designation	Mc1	M2	M3	M4	M5	Mc6
Numbering	7xx1	7xx2	7xx3	7xx4	7xx5	7xx6

("xx" stands for the unit number.)

=== 7500 series ===
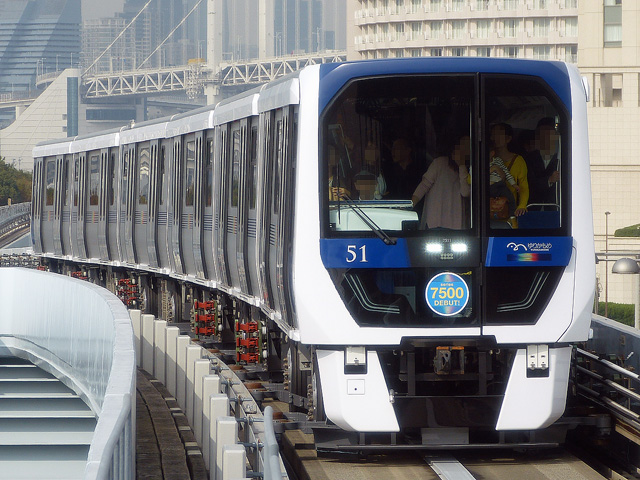
7500 series set 51 in November 2018

A new fleet of eight 7500 series trains to replace the original 7200 series was placed into revenue service on November 11, 2018. These trains were largely similar to the 7300 series, but included several refinements and a new front-end design featuring blue LED lights shaped like the wings of a bird (the line's namesake), which are illuminated when the trains are in self-driving mode. The front ends of the cars, along with the panels between the cars, are painted with a blue accent color. In November 2020, delivery of the eight six-car sets was completed.

Eight 7500 series sets (51 to 58) are in service, formed as six-car sets as follows.

Car No.	1	2	3	4	5	6
Designation	Mc1	M2	M3	M4	M5	Mc6
Numbering	7xx1	7xx2	7xx3	7xx4	7xx5	7xx6

("xx" stands for the unit number.)

== Ridership ==
Riding towards and into the Rainbow Bridge on the Yurikamome with several trains passing in the other direction, 2020

Ridership on the line peaked at over 200,000 daily boardings in 2000, but declined substantially by 2004 as the Rinkai Line, which opened a year after the Yurikamome, expanded further into the waterfront area and offered lower fares. Between 2004 and 2006, four new stations were added, which raised ridership slightly. As of 2023, daily ridership is roughly 97% of pre-pandemic levels, with patronage shifting to the eastern end of the line.

Station		2000	2004	2006	2019	2022	2023
U01	Shimbashi	94,217	63,791	58,824	63,123	44,343	56,027
U02	Shiodome	—N/a	7,500	7,805	8,755	5,650	7,463
U03	Takeshiba	4,681	9,301	4,701	4,508	4,126	4,833
U04	Hinode	1,675	2,043	2,271	2,322	2,015	2,404
U05	Shibaura-futō	6,970	5,875	5,166	5,090	4,313	4,907
U06	Odaiba-kaihinkōen	19,406	15,859	14,497	16,899	11,171	13,195
U07	Daiba	28,838	22,866	21,682	21,421	14,135	20,606
U08	Tokyo International Cruise Terminal	2,734	3,506	3,579	3,191	2,300	2,963
U09	Telecom Center	13,561	11,233	10,649	12,140	8,118	8,505
U10	Aomi	11,529	7,152	7,153	11,884	1,707	1,483
U11	Tokyo Big Sight	21,420	13,885	16,312	16,690	13,876	19,352
U12	Ariake	3,531	2,509	3,743	5,818	7,669	9,242
U13	Ariake-Tennis-no-mori	—N/a	—N/a	1,185	5,022	6,351	8,148
U14	Shijō-mae	—N/a	—N/a	76	11,393	11,285	13,997
U15	Shin-toyosu	—N/a	—N/a	893	6,796	7,144	11,256
U16	Toyosu	—N/a	—N/a	9,494	28,916	27,545	33,957
Total		208,562	165,520	168,030	223,968	171,748	218,338

== See also ==
- List of tram and light-rail transit systems
- People mover
