= Ariake-Tennis-no-mori Station =

Railway station in Tokyo, Japan

Coordinates: 35.64°N 139.7889°E

U13 Ariake-Tennis-no-mori Station 有明テニスの森駅
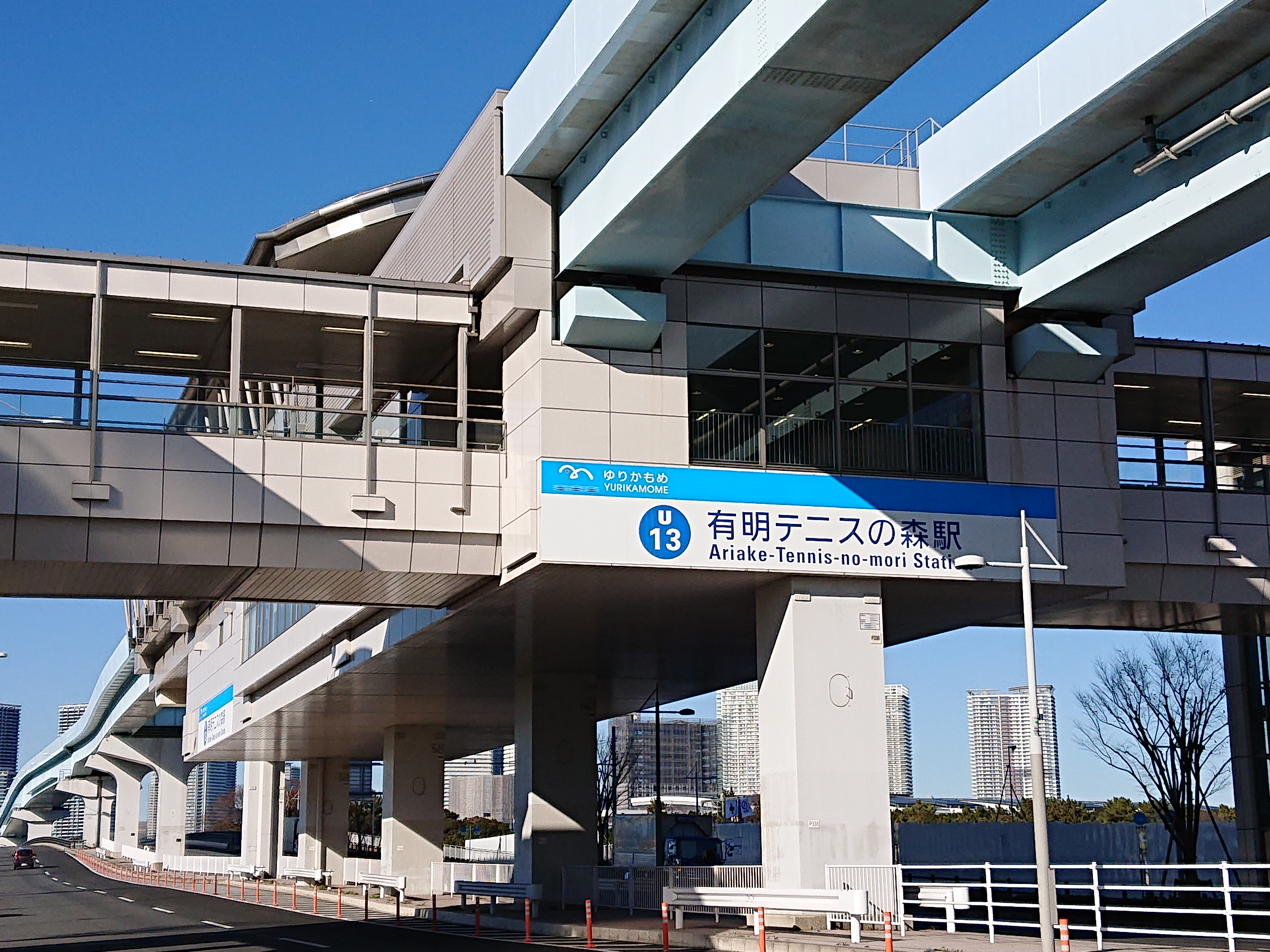

General information
- Location: Kōtō, Tokyo; Japan
- Operator: Yurikamome, Inc.
- Line: Yurikamome
- Connections

Other information
- Station code: U-13

History
- Opened: 27 March 2006

Passengers
- FY2023: 8,148 (daily)

Services
Preceding station	Yurikamome	Following station
Ariake U12 towards Shimbashi	New Transit Yurikamome	Shijō-mae U14 towards Toyosu
Location

Ariake-Tennis-no-mori Station (Japanese: 有明テニスの森駅, Hepburn: Ariake Tenisu-no-mori-eki; lit. 'Ariake Tennis Park Station') is a train station in Kōtō, Tokyo Prefecture, Japan. Its station number is U-13. The station opened on 27 March 2006.

The name of this station is in reference to the nearby Ariake Tennis Park, where the Japan Open professional tennis tournament is held.

The Station was built partly in anticipation of the 2020 Olympics. In addition to the tennis park, the nearby Ariake Arena hosted Volleyball at the 2020 Summer Olympics, and a variety of events are held there since. The Arena makes a profit from the many events and concerts there; however, "crowds for such events have created monster headaches for residents in the area."

Also near the station is a shopping mall, Ariake Garden, which has 200 stores.
