= Ariake Station (Tokyo) =

Railway station in Tokyo, Japan

U12 Ariake 有明駅
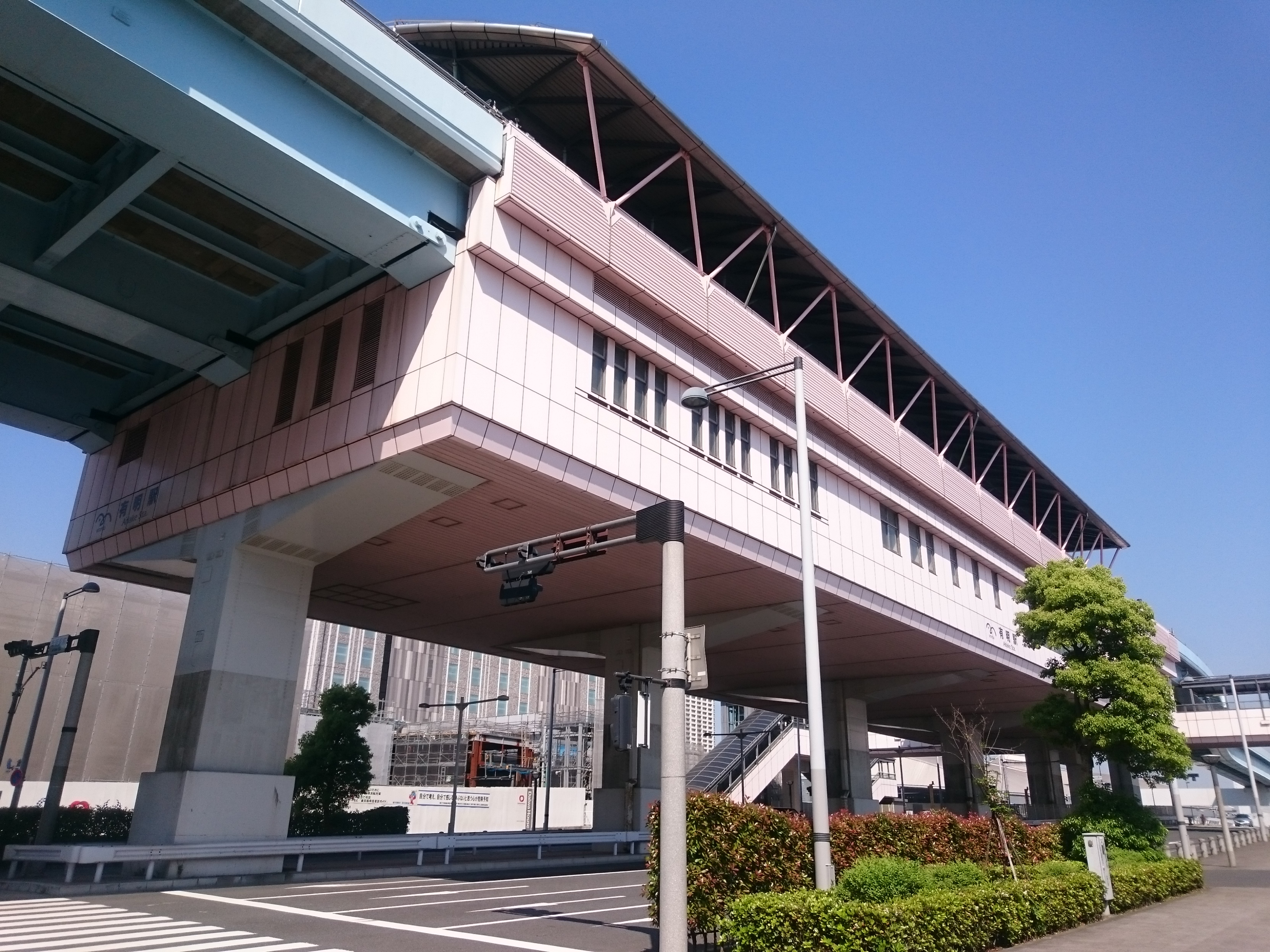
- Ariake station, May 2018

General information
- Location: Kōtō, Tokyo; Japan
- Coordinates: 35°38′05″N 139°47′36″E
- Owner: Yurikamome, Inc.
- Line: Yurikamome
- Platforms: 2 island platforms
- Tracks: 3
- Connections: Rinkai Line (Kokusai-Tenjijō: R-03); Tokyo BRT (Kokusai-Tenjijō: B-05)

Construction
- Structure type: Elevated
- Accessible: Yes

Other information
- Station code: U-12

History
- Opened: 1 November 1995

Passengers
- JFY23: 9,242 (daily)

Services
Preceding station	Yurikamome	Following station
Tokyo Big Sight U11 towards Shimbashi	New Transit Yurikamome	Ariake-Tennis-no-mori U13 towards Toyosu
Location

Ariake station (Japanese: 有明駅, Hepburn: Ariake-eki) is a railway station on the Yurikamome, an automated transit line in Kōtō, Tokyo, Japan. Its station number is U-12. Opened on 1 November 1995, the station is located within walking distance of Kokusai-Tenjijō Station on the Rinkai Line. The station is also located near a large bus plaza, which serves as a stop on the Tokyo BRT line. It originally opened as the line's eastern terminus before the extension to Toyosu opened in March 2006. However, some services from Shimbashi still terminate at Ariake.

The station consists of two elevated island platforms serving three tracks.

During Japanese fiscal year (JFY) 2023, the station was used on average by 9,242 passengers daily. (Note: Data published by the Ministry of Land, Infrastructure, Transport and Tourism state the number of passengers boarding and disembarking by station in a given year. JFY23 covers the period from 1 April 2023 to 31 March 2024. Data published by individual railways directly may state the number boarding only.)

== Surrounding area ==
- Ariake Coliseum
- Ariake Tennis Forest Park
- DoubleTree Tokyo Ariake
- Japanese Foundation for Cancer Research Cancer Institute Hospital
- Panasonic Centre Tokyo
- Symbol Promenade Park
- Tokyo Big Sight (East Halls)
- Tokyo Bay Ariake Washington Hotel
- Tokyo Garden Theatre
- Tokyo Metropolitan Disaster Prevention Center
