= Daiba Station (Tokyo) =

Railway station in Tokyo, Japan

Coordinates: 35°37′33.27″N 139°46′17.09″E

U07 Daiba Station 台場駅
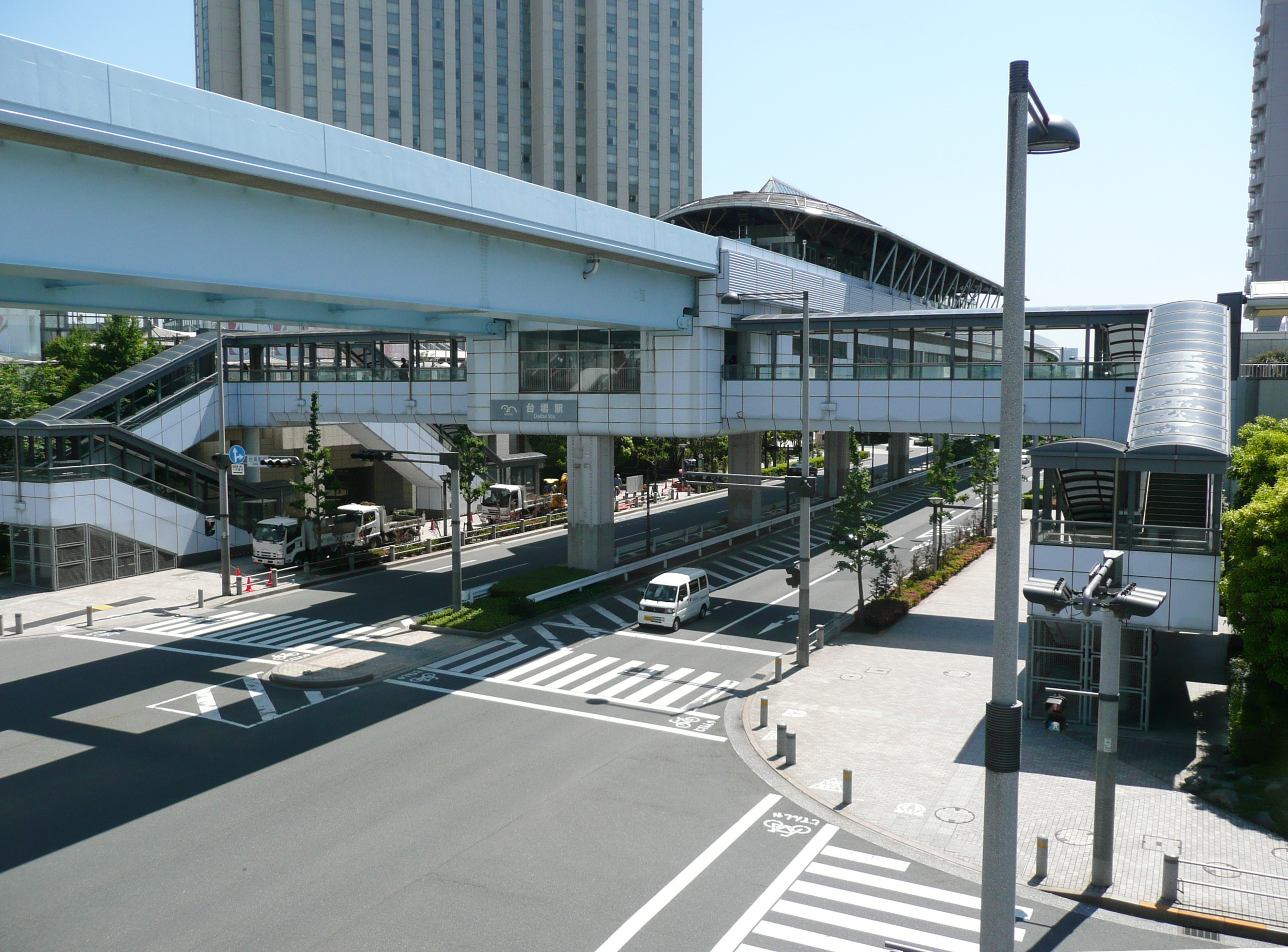

General information
- Location: Minato, Tokyo; Japan
- Operator: Yurikamome, Inc.
- Line: Yurikamome
- Connections: Bus stop

Other information
- Station code: U-07

History
- Opened: 1 November 1995

Passengers
- FY2023: 20,606 (daily)

Services
Preceding station	Yurikamome	Following station
Odaiba-kaihinkōen U06 towards Shimbashi	New Transit Yurikamome	Tokyo International Cruise Terminal U08 towards Toyosu
Location

Daiba Station (台場駅, Daiba-eki) is a station on the Yurikamome Line in Minato, Tokyo, Japan. It is numbered "U-07".

== Station layout ==
The station consists of an elevated island platform.

=== Platforms ===
1	Yurikamome	for Aomi, Ariake, and Toyosu
2	Yurikamome	for Shimbashi

== History ==
Daiba Station opened on 1 November 1995.

== Surrounding area ==
A Hilton hotel, a Grand Nikko hotel, and AQUA CiTY ODAIBA mall are located near the station.
