= Aomi Station =

Railway station in Tokyo, Japan

U10 Aomi Station 青海駅
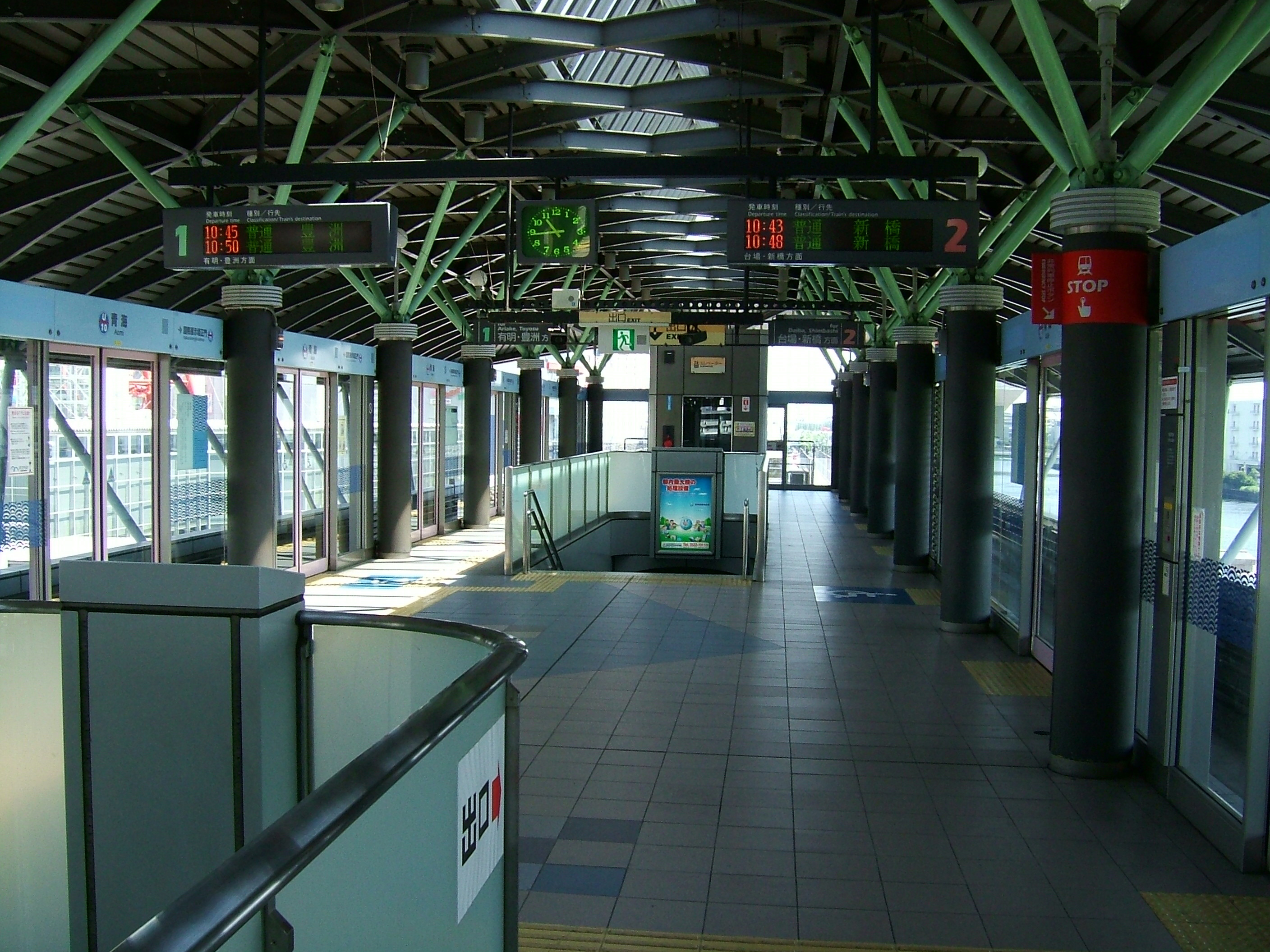

General information
- Location: Kōtō, Tokyo; Japan
- Coordinates: 35°37′29.1″N 139°46′52.7″E
- Operator: Yurikamome, Inc.
- Line: Yurikamome
- Connections: Bus stop

Other information
- Station code: U-10

History
- Opened: 1 November 1995

Passengers
- FY2023: 1,483 (daily)

Services
Preceding station	Yurikamome	Following station
Telecom Center U09 towards Shimbashi	New Transit Yurikamome	Tokyo Big Sight U11 towards Toyosu
Location

Aomi Station (青海駅, Aomi-eki) is a station on the Yurikamome Line in Kōtō, Tokyo, Japan. It is numbered "U-10".

== Station layout ==
The station consists of an elevated island platform.

=== Platforms ===
1	Yurikamome	for Toyosu
2	Yurikamome	for Daiba and Shimbashi

== History ==
Aomi Station opened on 1 November 1995.

== Surrounding area ==
It is currently adjacent to an embarkation pier for the Tokyo water bus lines.

Palette Town was the main source of ridership for Aomi Station from its opening, until the complex was closed in 2022 for redevelopment. The Toyota Arena Tokyo was opened in its former location in 2025.
