= Tsukijishijō Station =

Metro station in Tokyo, Japan

Coordinates: 35.6649°N 139.7671°E

Tsukijishijō Station 築地市場駅

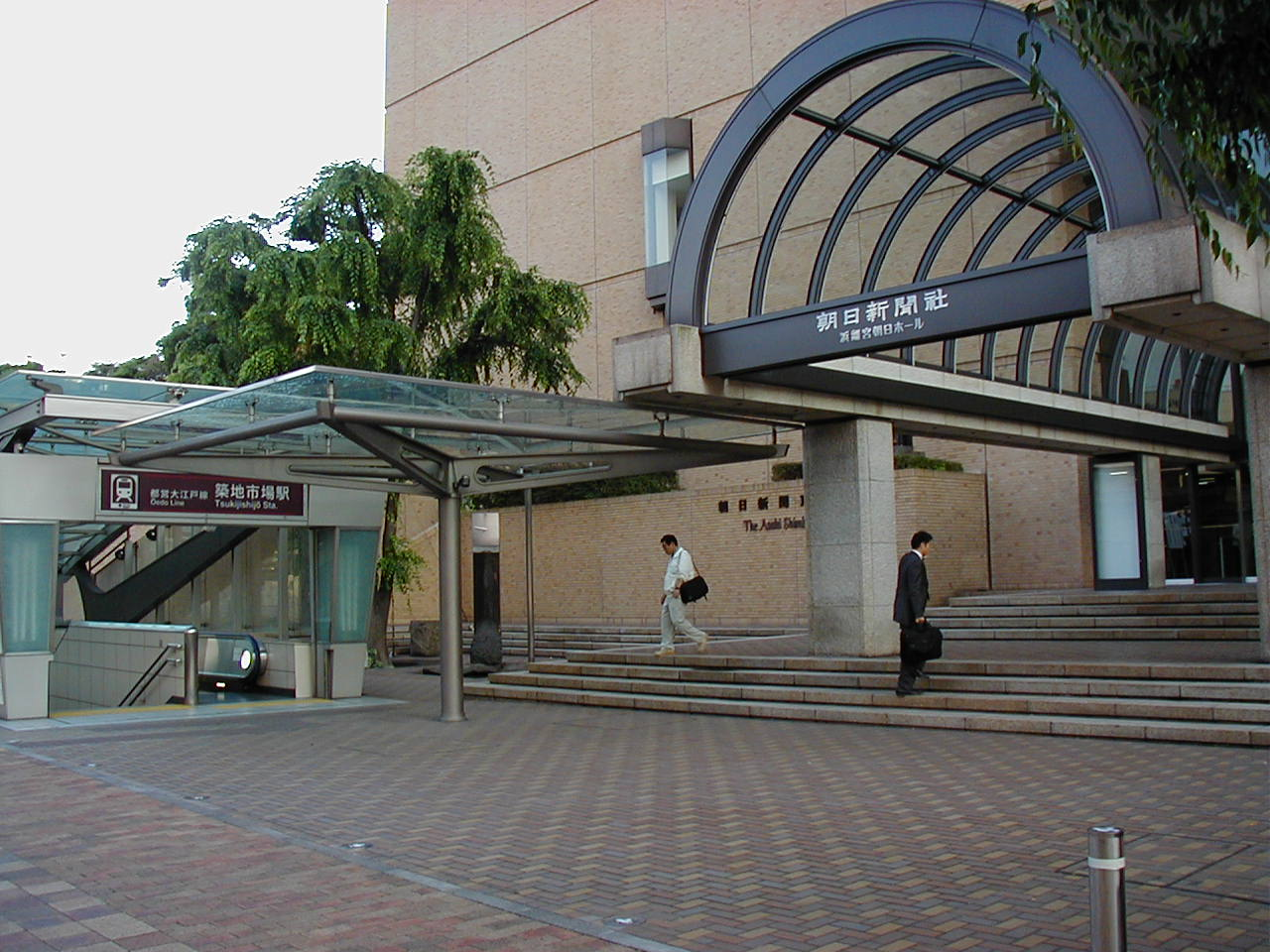
- Station portal directly in front of main entrance to the Asahi Shimbun

General information
- Location: 5-1-2 Tsukiji, Chūō, Tokyo; Japan
- Operator: Toei Subway
- Line: Ōedo Line
- Platforms: 1 island platform
- Tracks: 2

Construction
- Structure type: Underground

Other information
- Station code: E-18

History
- Opened: 12 December 2000; 25 years ago

Services
| Preceding station | Toei Subway | Following station |
|---|---|---|
| Shiodome towards Hikarigaoka | Ōedo Line | Kachidoki towards Tochōmae |
Location
- Location within Tokyo Yamanote Loop Location within Tokyo wards area Location within Japan

Tsukijishijō Station (築地市場駅, Tsukiji-shijō-eki) is a subway station in Chūō, Tokyo, Japan operated by the Tokyo subway operator Toei Subway. It serves the lower part of the Tsukiji district, including the former location of the Tokyo Metropolitan Central Wholesale Market (which moved to Toyosu in 2018), the Tokyo headquarters of the Asahi Shimbun newspaper, and Japan's National Cancer Center.

== Lines ==
Tsukijishijō Station is served by the Toei Ōedo Line, and is numbered E-18.

== Station layout ==
The station is composed of an underground island platform serving two tracks.

=== Platforms ===
| 1 | Ōedo Line | for Ryōgoku and Iidabashi |
| 2 | Ōedo Line | for Daimon and Roppongi |

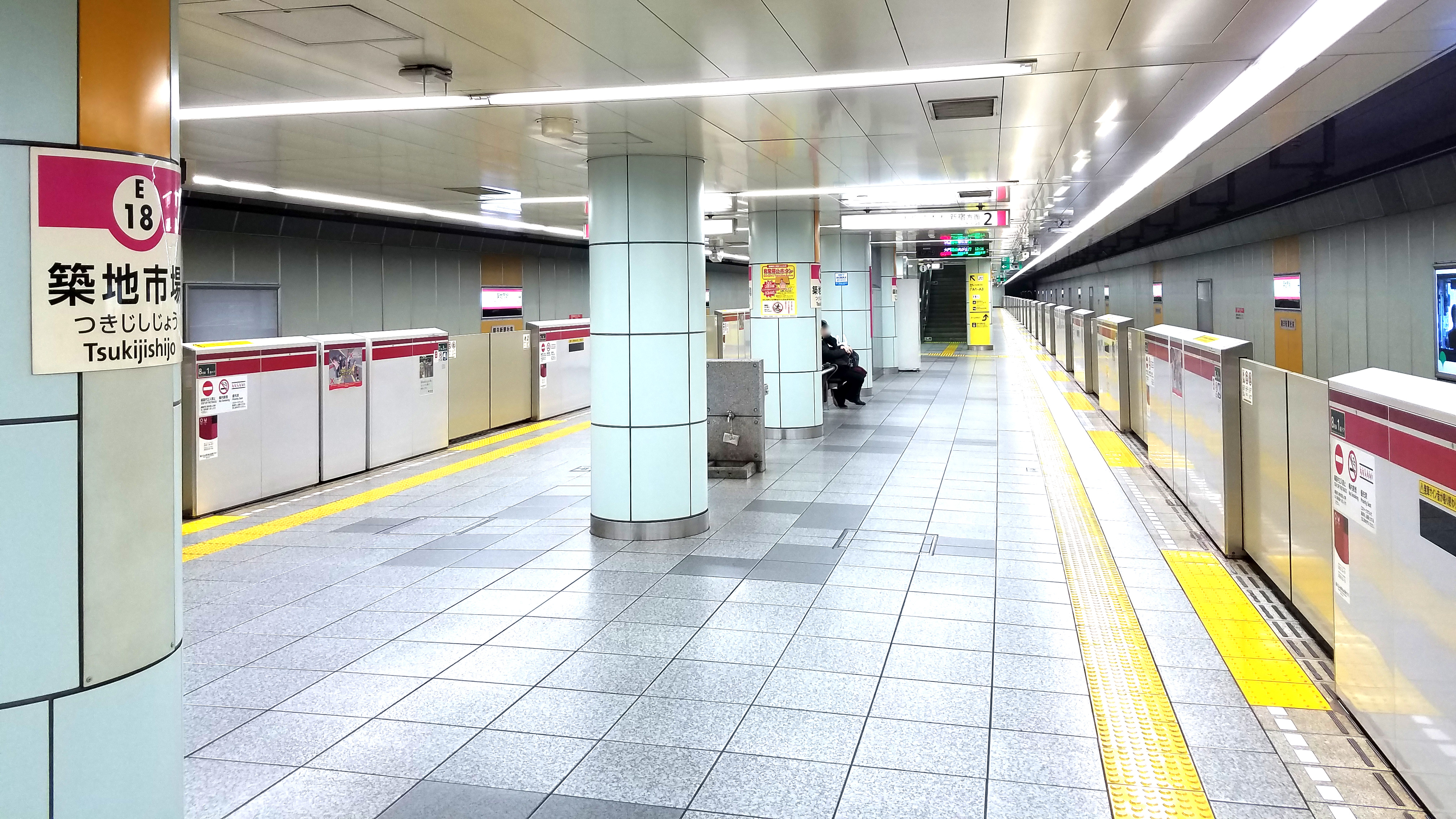
Platforms, December 2019

== History ==
The station opened on 12 December 2000.

== Surrounding area ==
- Tsukiji fish market
- Asahi Shimbun
- Japan National Cancer Center
- Hamarikyu Gardens
- Tsukiji Hongan-ji
- Shiodome

== See also ==
- List of railway stations in Japan
