= Tsukiji fish market =

Former fish market in Tokyo, Japan

Coordinates: 35°39′41″N 139°46′11″E

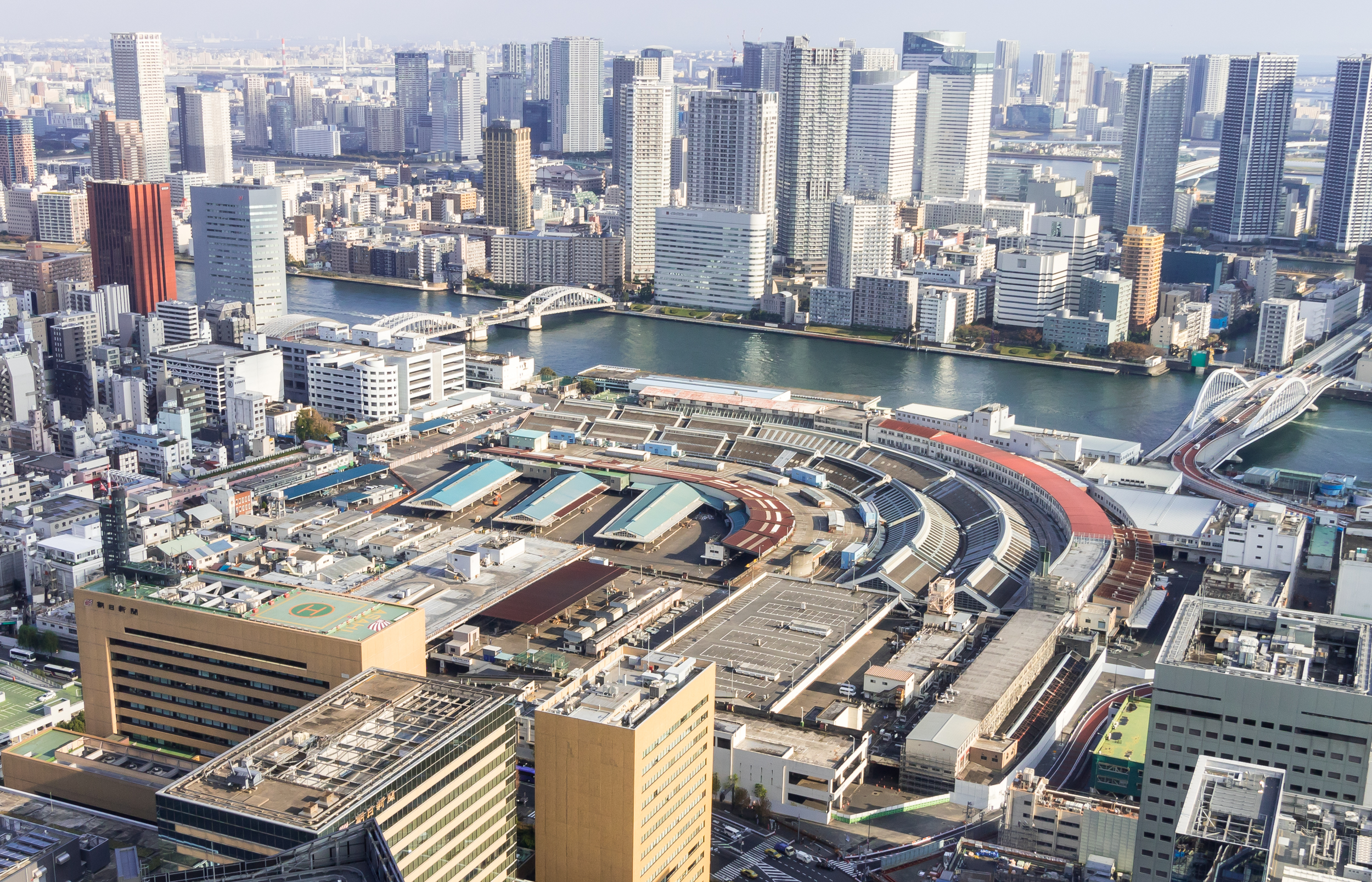
Tsukiji as seen from Shiodome, 2018

Tsukiji Market (築地市場, Tsukiji shijō) is a former seafood market and major tourist attraction in Tokyo. Located in Tsukiji in central Tokyo between the Sumida River and the upmarket Ginza shopping district, the area contains retail markets, restaurants, and associated restaurant supply stores. Before 2018, it was the largest wholesale fish and seafood market in the world. The market opened on 11 February 1935 as a replacement for an older market that was destroyed in the 1923 Great Kantō earthquake. It was closed on 6 October 2018, with wholesale operations moving to the new Toyosu Market. The old market was demolished and will be rebuilt into a new complex featuring a stadium for the Yomiuri Giants of the Nippon Professional Baseball.

The market was supervised by the Tokyo Metropolitan Central Wholesale Market (東京都中央卸売市場, Tōkyō-to Chūō Oroshiuri Shijō) of the Tokyo Metropolitan Bureau of Industrial and Labor Affairs.

== Location ==
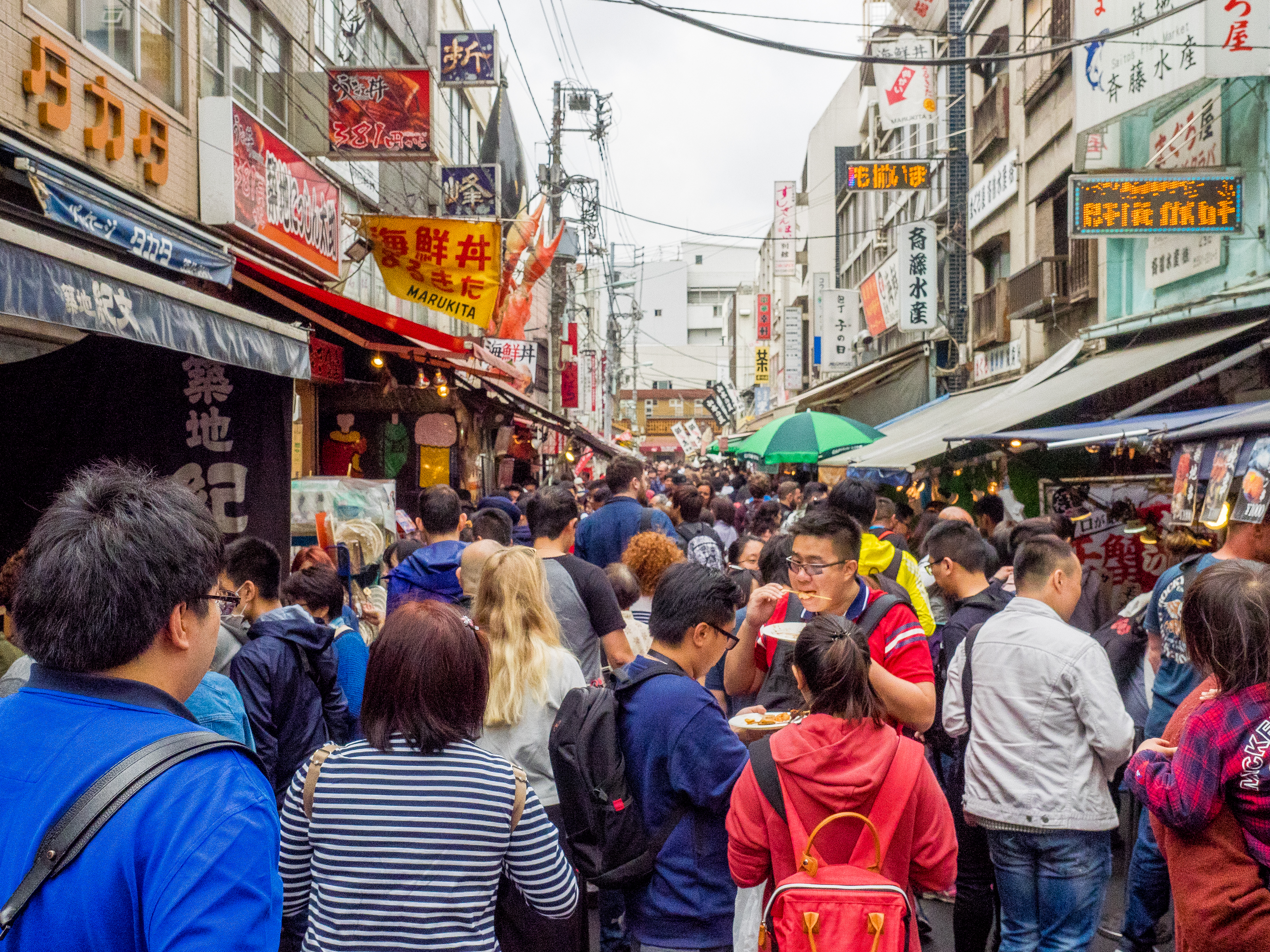
A busy street in Tsukiji

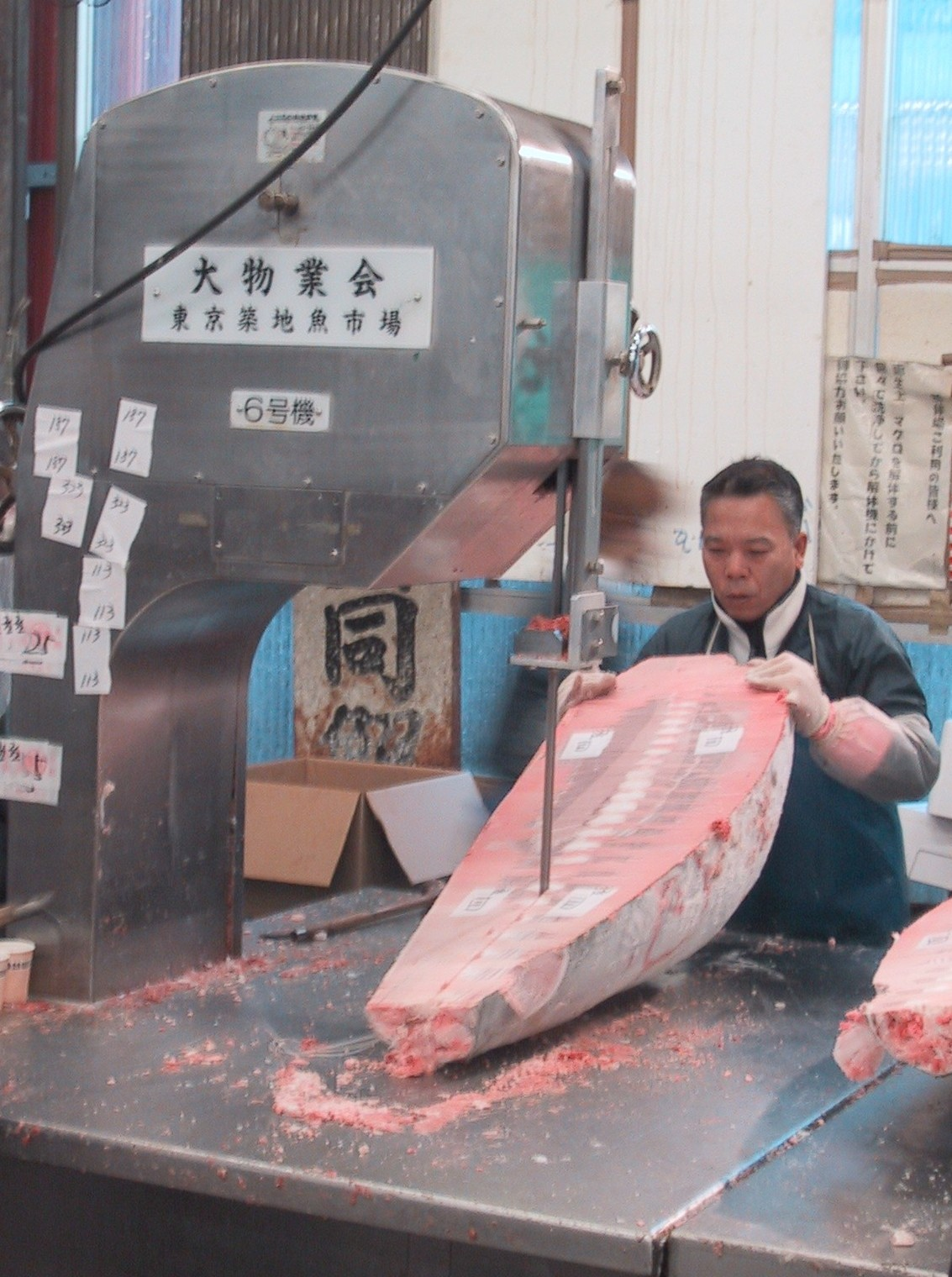
Cut frozen tuna being prepared

The market is located near the Tsukijishijō Station on the Toei Ōedo Line and Tsukiji Station on the Tokyo Metro Hibiya Line. There were two distinct sections of the market as a whole, but after the transfer to Toyosu, only the outer market remains. The inner market (jōnai-shijō) was the licensed wholesale market, where approximately 900 licensed wholesale dealers operated small stalls and where the auctions and most of the processing of the fish took place. The outer market (jōgai-shijō) is a mixture of wholesale and retail shops that sell Japanese kitchen tools, restaurant supplies, groceries, and seafood, and many restaurants, especially sushi restaurants. Most of the shops in the outer market closed by the early afternoon. Visitors were only admitted to the inner market from 10.00 am (11.00 am by the time the market was moved), by which time the activity in the market had reduced significantly or almost ceased. At times, the inner wholesale market was entirely closed to visitors. A small number of visitors however were allowed into the inner market in the early morning to see the tuna auction.

== History ==
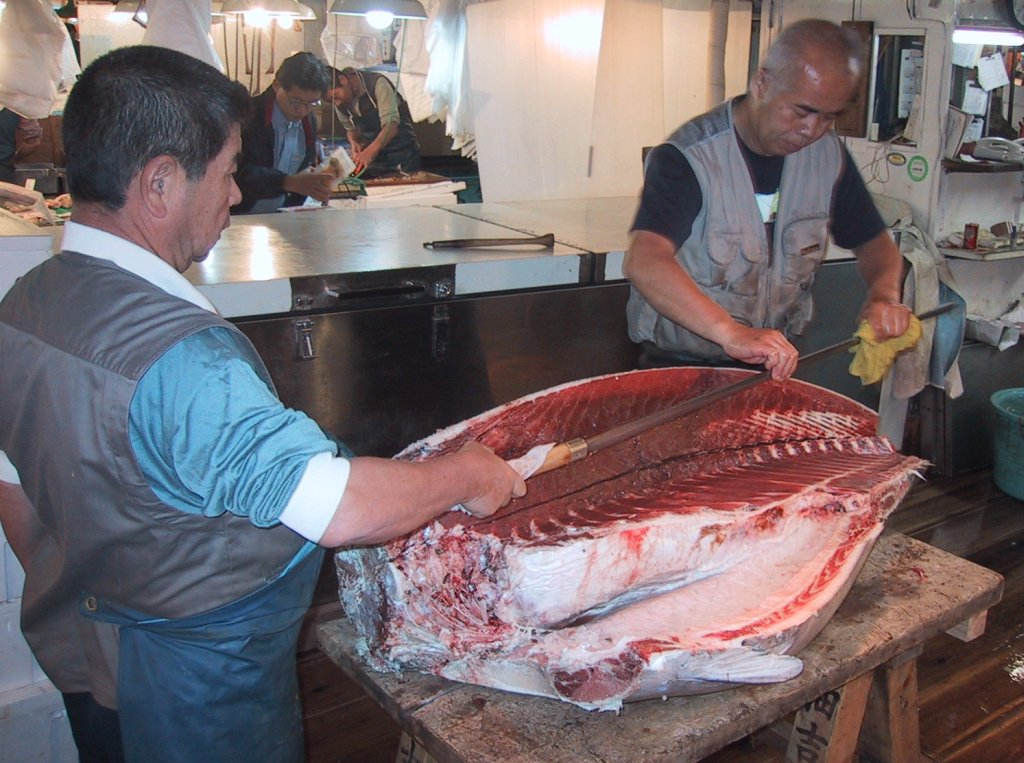
A maguro bōchō in use

=== Origin ===
The land on which the fish market sat was created during the Edo period by the Tokugawa shogunate after the Great fire of Meireki of 1657. It was created through land reclamation on the Tokyo Bay, and the area was therefore named Tsukiji (築地), meaning "constructed land" or "reclaimed land". The fish market however was not sited here until the 20th century.

The first fish market in Tokyo was originally located in the Nihonbashi district, next to the Nihonbashi bridge that gave the area its name. The area was one of the earliest places to be settled when Edo (as Tokyo was known until the 1870s) was made the capital by Tokugawa Ieyasu, and the market provided food for the Edo Castle built on a nearby hill. Tokugawa Ieyasu took a number of fishermen from Tsukuda, Osaka to Edo to provide fish for the castle in 1590. Fish not bought by the castle was then sold near the Nihonbashi bridge, at a market called uogashi (literally, "fish quay").

In August 1918, following the so-called Rice Riots (Kome Sōdō), which broke out in over 100 cities and towns in protest against food shortages and the speculative practices of wholesalers, the Japanese government was forced to create new institutions for the distribution of foodstuffs, especially in urban areas. A Central Wholesale Market Law was established in March 1923.

The Great Kantō earthquake on 1 September 1923 devastated much of central Tokyo, including the Nihonbashi fish market. The Tokyo government, which already had plans to relocate the market due to its unsanitary conditions considered unsuitable for an area that had developed into a business center, then took the opportunity to move the market to the Tsukiji district.

=== Construction and opening ===
Tsukiji fish market, Tokyo, October 1952

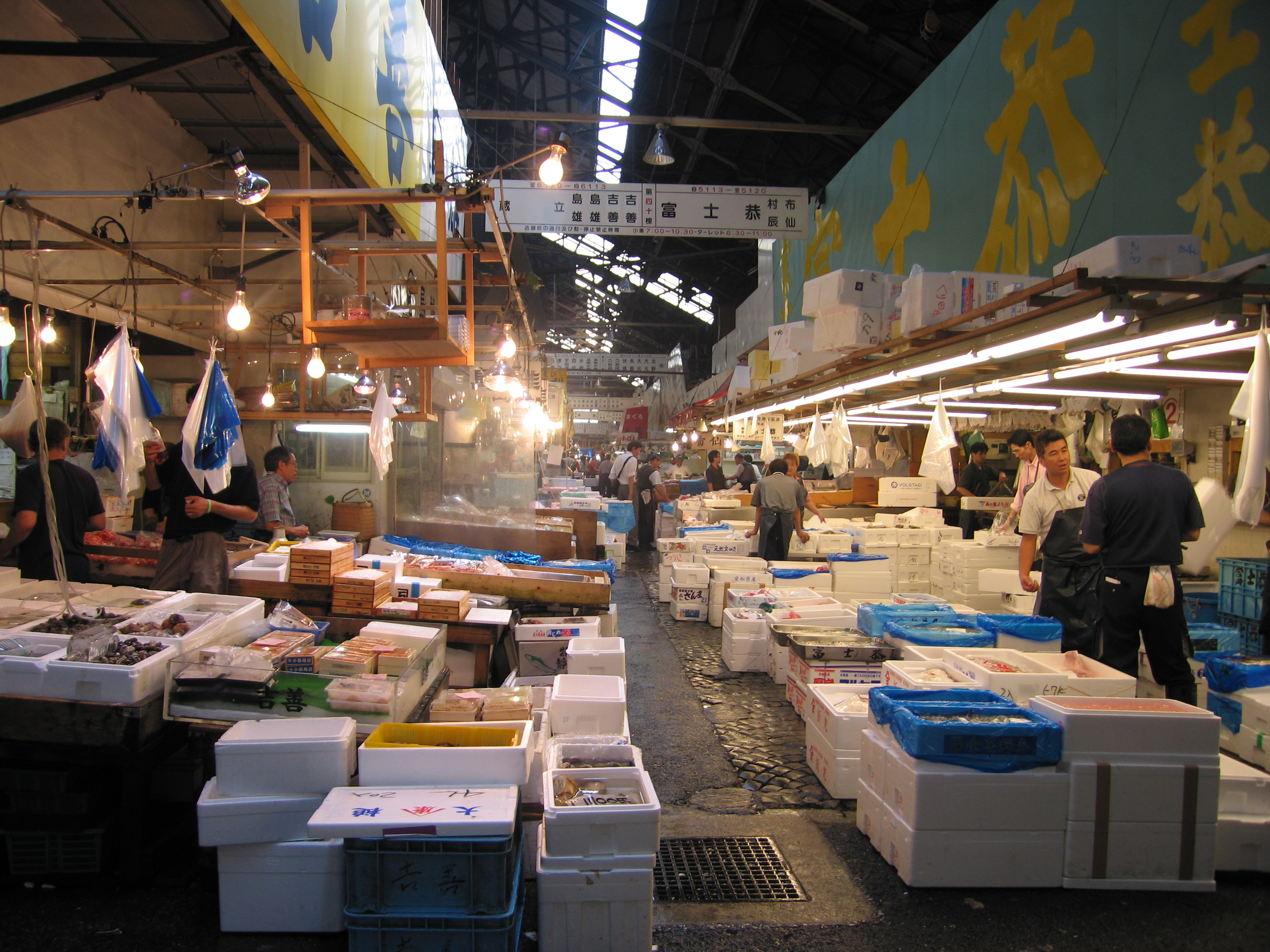
The stalls at the fish market

Following the 1923 Great Kantō earthquake architects and engineers from the Architectural Section of Tokyo Municipal Government were sent to Europe and America to do research for the new market. However, because of the sheer size of the market and the number of items traded they were forced to come up with their own unique design. The quarter circular shape allowed easier access and handling for freight trains and the steel structure above allowed a wide, continuous space free from columns and subdivisions. The relocation of the market would be one of the biggest reconstruction projects in Tokyo after the earthquake, taking over six years involving 419,500 workers.

Tsukiji was officially opened on February 11, 1935. On the same day, Tōkyō-Shijō station (東京市場駅) was opened with tracks designed around the market area. In this year, the big three markets (Tsukiji, Kanda and Koto) began operations as Tokyo Metropolitan Government's system of Central Wholesale Markets. And then, smaller branch markets (Ebara fruit and vegetables market, Toshima market, Adachi market and Meat market) were opened one by one in succession.

=== Relocation to Toyosu Market ===
After World War II, Tsukiji's transaction increased in volume, and its facilities became narrow and old fashioned. Relocation plans had been considered since the late 1950s. The candidate place was Ohi, current Ohta market. However the plan could not get consensus among stakeholders. There was another plan in the late 1980s to construct provisional market utilizing the vast site of Shiodome Freight Terminal, and rebuild advanced market facilities in Tsukiji area during that period. However the negotiation with Japanese National Railways was unsuccessful.

in 1998, six industry groups participating to Tsukiji market submitted a request in their joint signature to the Tokyo Metropolitan Government to conduct a study and hold discussion of an opportunity about relocating market functions to Tokyo Waterfront Area, four of them were for the relocation and the remaining two were against. Throughout 1999, related municipal or urban engineering studies were conducted and discussing committees were held. In 2000, six industry groups and Tokyo Metropolitan Government reached an agreement to relocate.

The Tsukiji fish market occupies valuable real estate close to the center of the city. Former Tokyo Governor Shintaro Ishihara repeatedly called for moving the market to Toyosu, Koto. The long-anticipated move to the new Toyosu Market (豊洲市場) was scheduled to take place in November 2016, in preparation for the 2020 Summer Olympics, but on August 31, 2016, the move was postponed. There had been concerns that new location was heavily polluted and needed to be cleaned up. The groundwater at the site contained contaminants that "far exceeded environmental limits", which was mitigated by installing additional water pumps. There were plans to retain a retail market, roughly a quarter of the current operation, in Tsukiji. The remaining area of the market would be redeveloped.

In June 2017, plans to move the fish market were restarted. but delayed in July to the autumn of 2018. On 3 August 2017, a fire broke out in some of the outer buildings.

After the new site had been declared safe following a cleanup operation, the opening date of the new market was set for 11 October 2018. Tsukiji market closed on 6 October 2018, with the businesses of the inner market relocated to the new Toyosu Market between 6 and 11 October. Even though Tsukiji inner market has moved to Toyosu, the outer market remains, selling food and other goods. The former market was used temporarily as a hub for transport vehicles during the 2020 Tokyo Olympics.

On April 19, 2024, it was announced that the area where the market was located will be redeveloped into a new economic and entertainment area centralized with a new stadium for the Yomiuri Giants.

== Economics ==
The market handled more than 480 different kinds of seafood as well as 270 types of other produce, ranging from cheap seaweed to the most expensive caviar, and from tiny sardines to 300 kg tuna and controversial whale species. Overall, more than 700,000 metric tons of seafood are handled every year at the three seafood markets in Tokyo, with a total value in excess of 600 billion yen (approximately 5.4 billion US dollars in August 2018). At Tsukiji, around 1,628 tons of seafood worth 1.6 billion yen ($US14 million) may have been sold on a typical day. There were around 900 licensed dealers at the market, and the number of registered employees varied from 60,000 to 65,000, including wholesalers, accountants, auctioneers, company officials, and distributors.

== Operations ==
Until it closed in 2018, the market opened most mornings (except Sundays, holidays and some Wednesdays) at 3:00 a.m. with the arrival of the products by ship, truck and plane from all over the world. Particularly impressive was the unloading of tons of frozen tuna. The auction houses (wholesalers known in Japanese as oroshi gyōsha) then estimate the value and prepare the incoming products for the auctions. The buyers (licensed to participate in the auctions) also inspected the fish to discern which they would like to bid for and at what price.

The auctions started around 5:20 a.m. Bids can only be made by licensed participants. These bidders include intermediate wholesalers (nakaoroshi gyōsha) who operated stalls in the marketplace and other licensed buyers who were agents for restaurants, food processing companies, and large retailers.

The auctions usually ended around 10:00 a.m. Afterward, the purchased fish was either loaded onto trucks to be shipped to the next destination or on small carts and moved to the many shops inside the market. There the shop owners cut and prepare the products for retail. In case of large fish, for example tuna and swordfish, cutting and preparation was elaborate. Frozen tuna and swordfish were often cut with large band saws, and fresh tuna is carved with extremely long knives (some well over a meter in length) called oroshi-hōchō, maguro-bōchō, or hanchō-hōchō.

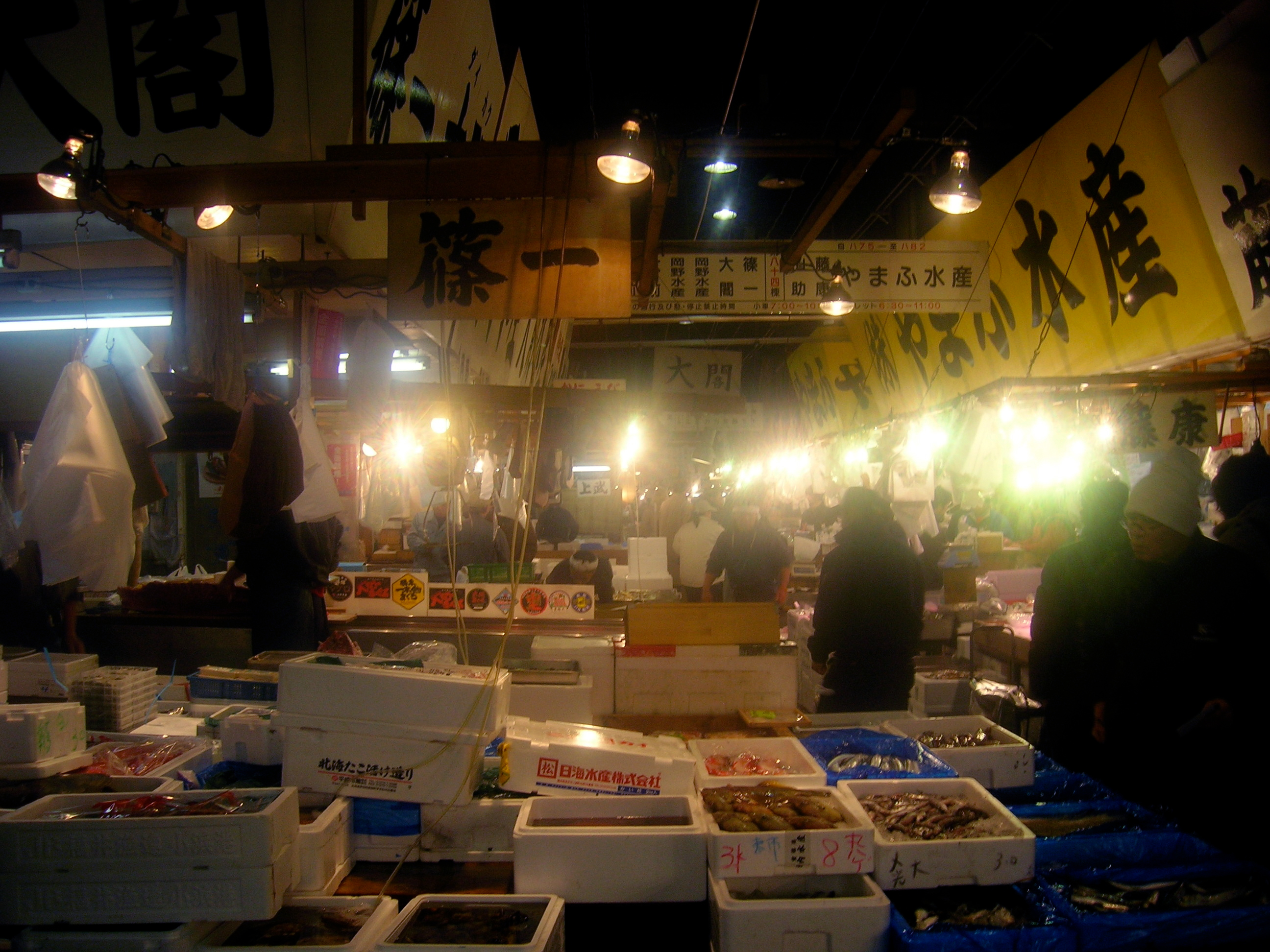
Vendors display the morning's catch at the market at 4:00 a.m.

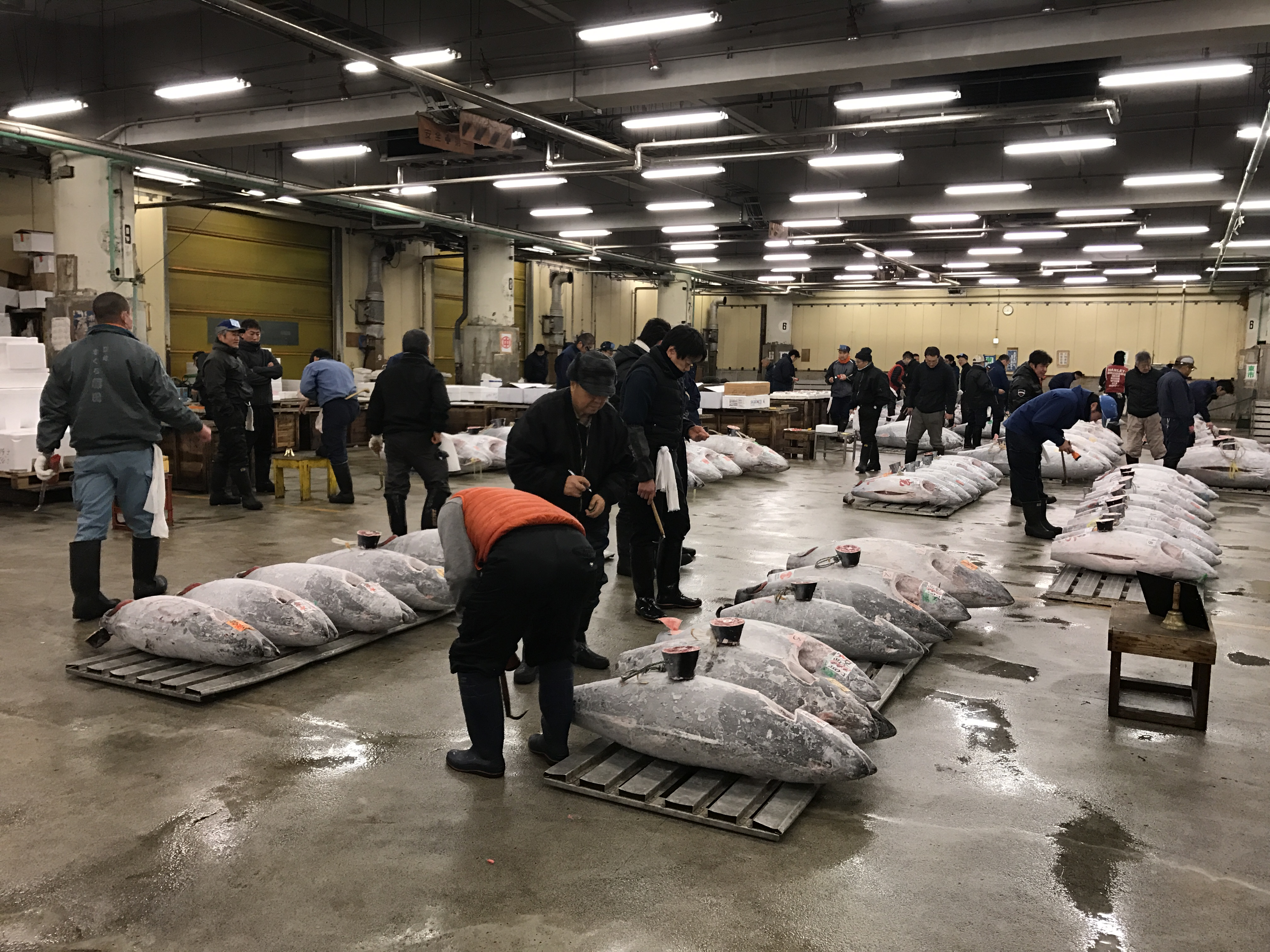
Start of the tuna auction at Tsukiji: buyers are checking the catch

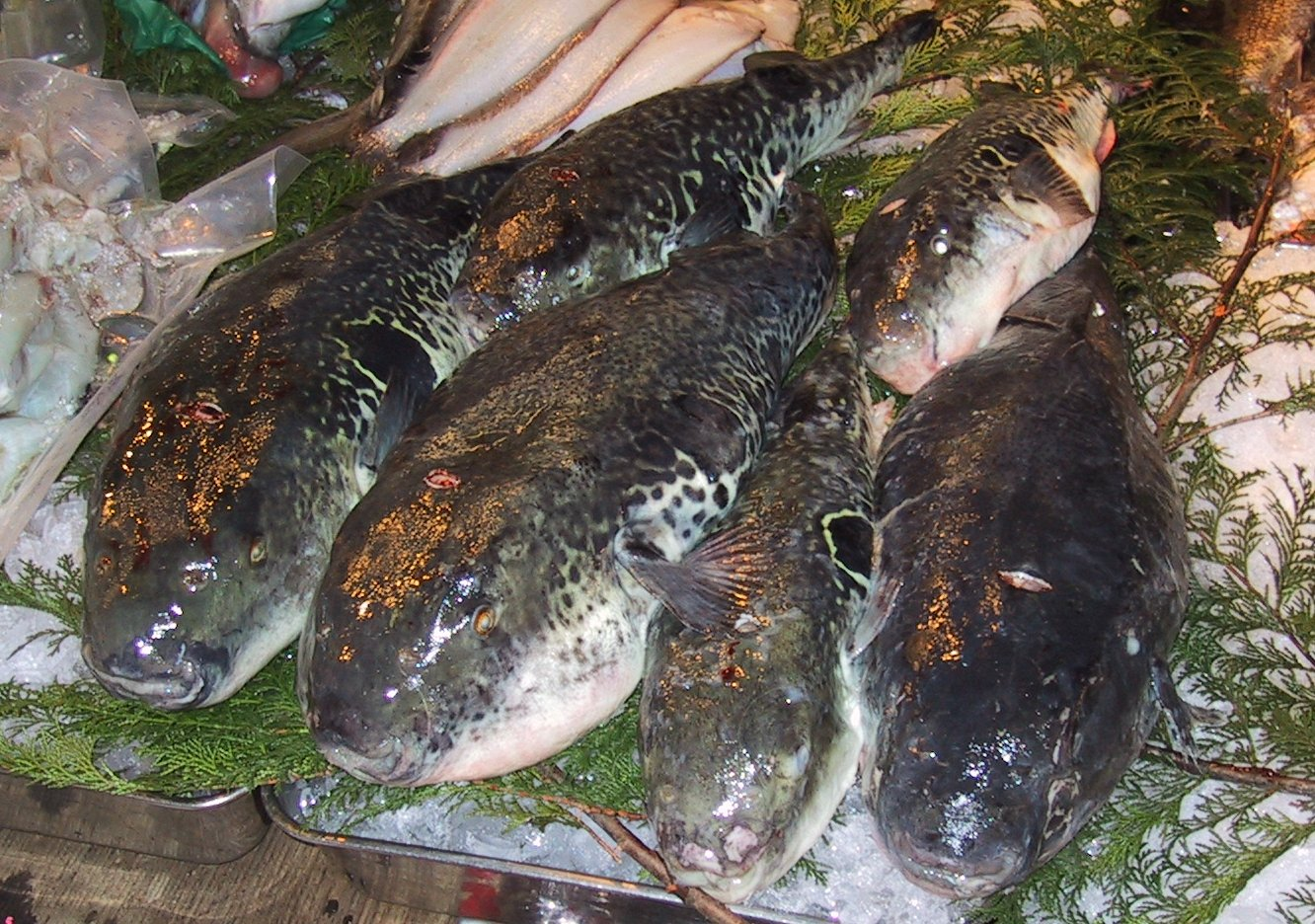
A tray of six Takifugu rubripes on ice for sale at Tsukiji

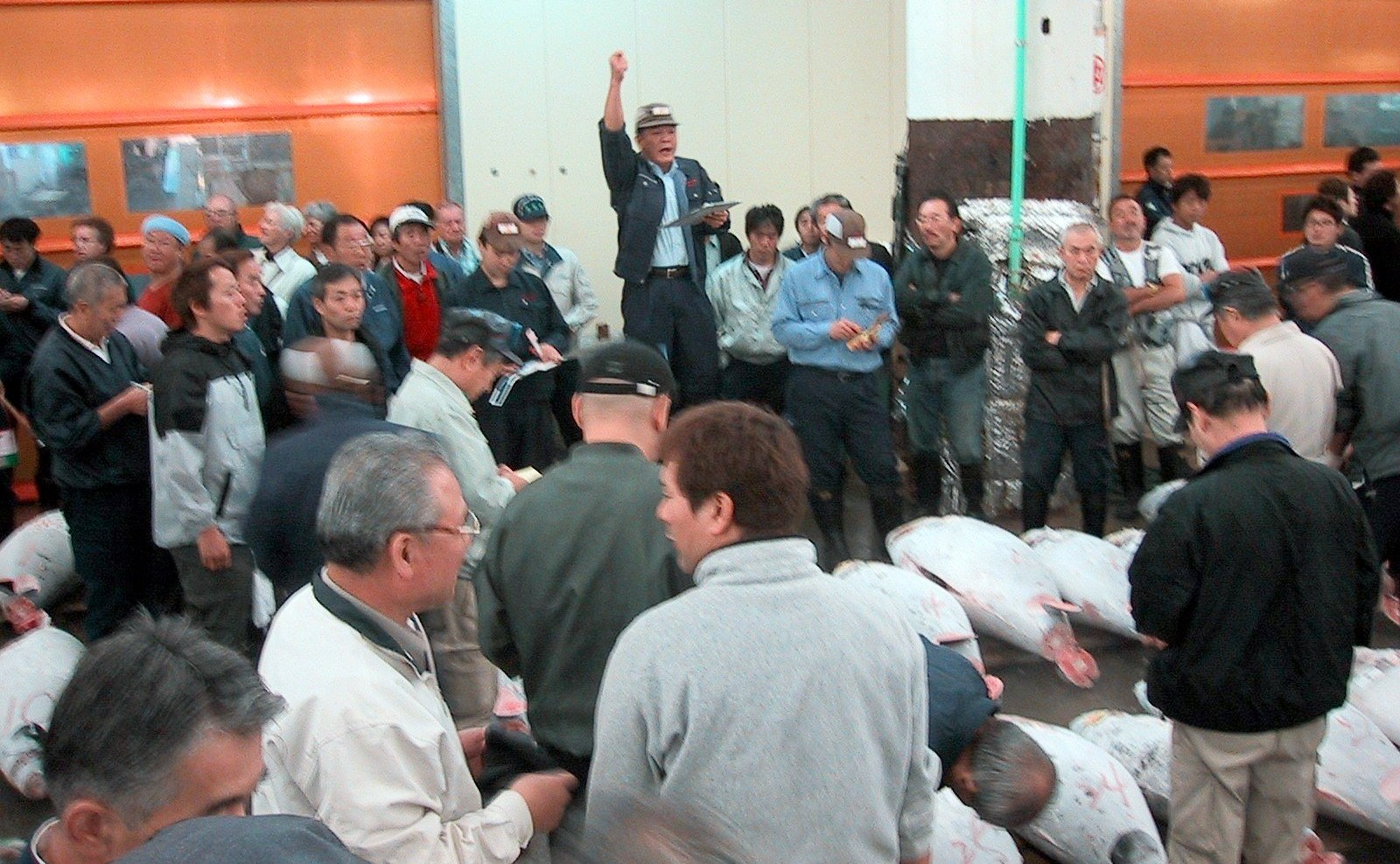
Tuna auction at Tsukiji

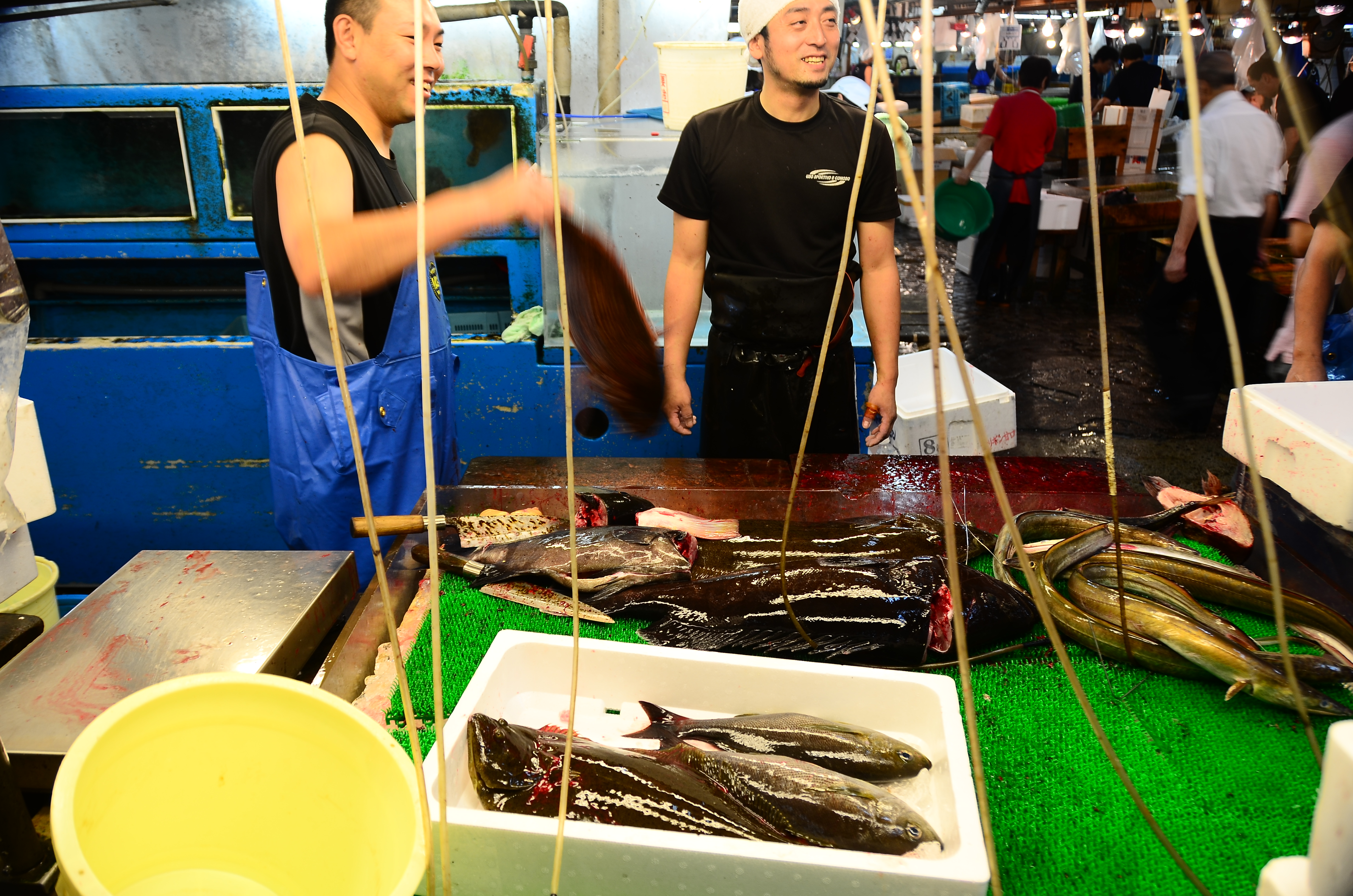
Fishermen cutting fish at Tsukiji

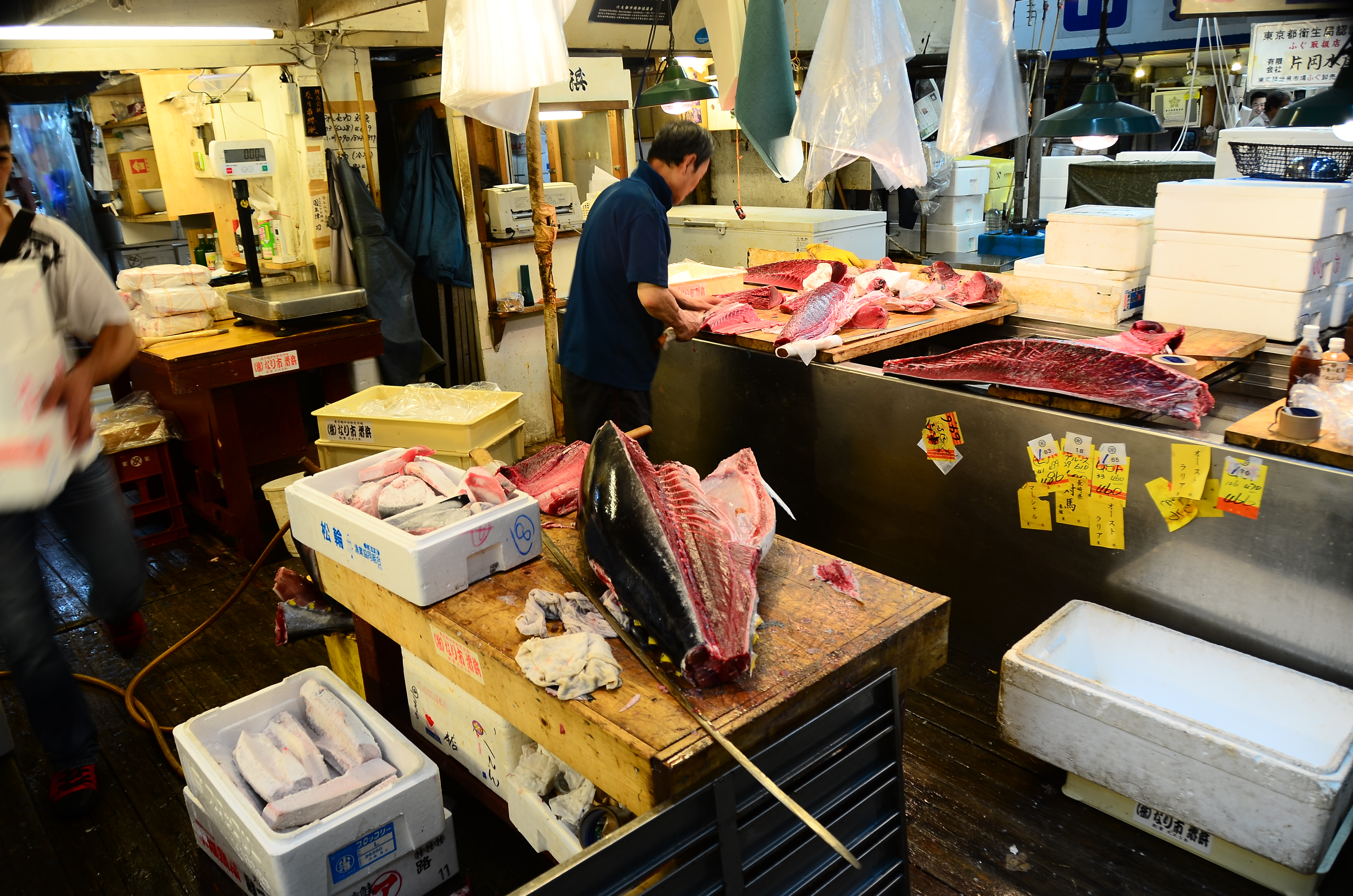
Fishermen cutting tuna at Tsukiji

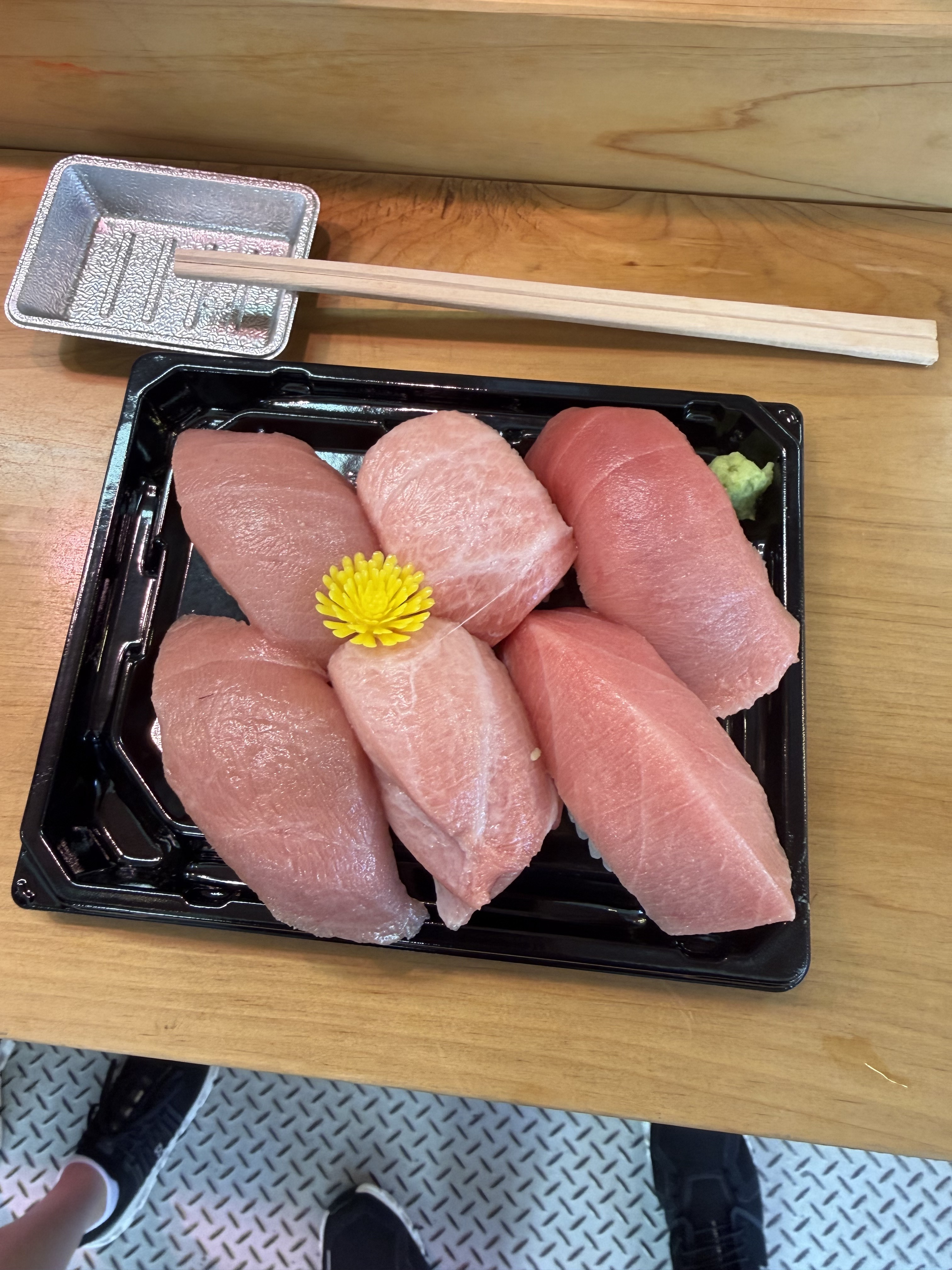
A selection of kamatoro and otoro nigiri at Tsukiji fish market

The market was the busiest between 6:30 and 9:00 a.m., and the activity declined significantly afterward. Many shops started to close around 11:00 a.m., and the market closed for cleaning around 1:00 p.m. Tourists visited the market daily between 5 a.m. and 6:15 a.m. and watched the proceedings from a designated area, except during periods when it was closed to the public.

Because of an increase in sightseers and the associated problems they cause, the market banned all tourists from the tuna auctions on several occasions, including from 15 December 2008 to 17 January 2009, 10 December 2009 to 23 January 2010, and 8 April 2010 to 10 May 2010. After the latest ban that ended in May 2010, the tuna auctions were re-opened to the public with a maximum limit of 120 visitors per day on a first-come, first-served basis. Visitor entry into the interior wholesale markets was prohibited until after 11:00 am. Due to the March 2011 earthquakes all tourists were banned from viewing the tuna auctions till 26 July 2011, from which date it was reopened.

Inspectors from the Tokyo Metropolitan Government supervised activities in the market to enforce the Food Hygiene Law.

== See also ==
- Toyosu Market
