= Maguro bōchō =

Traditional Japanese long knife used for filleting large fish

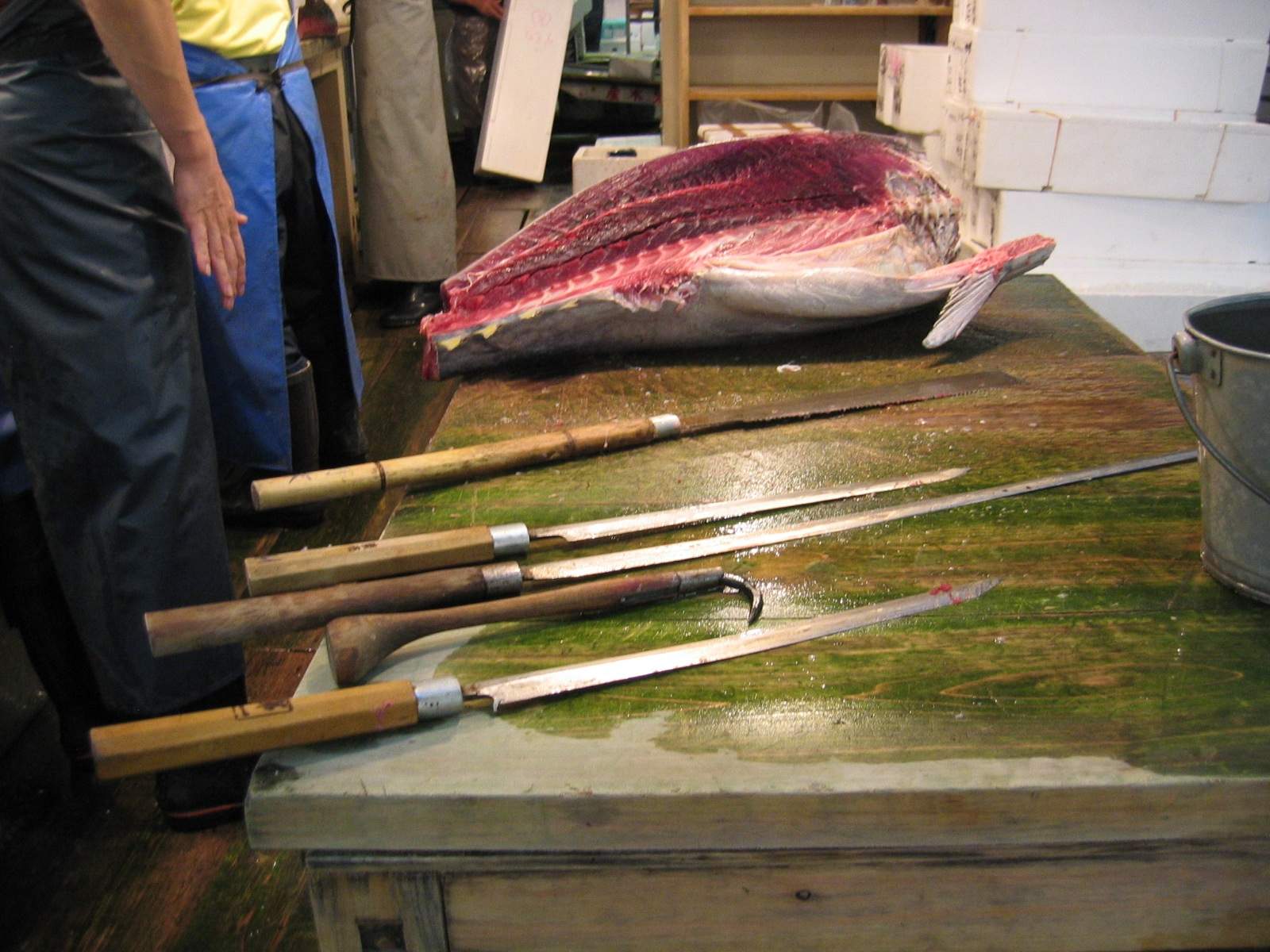
Long magurobōchō, used to filet tuna at the Tsukiji fish market

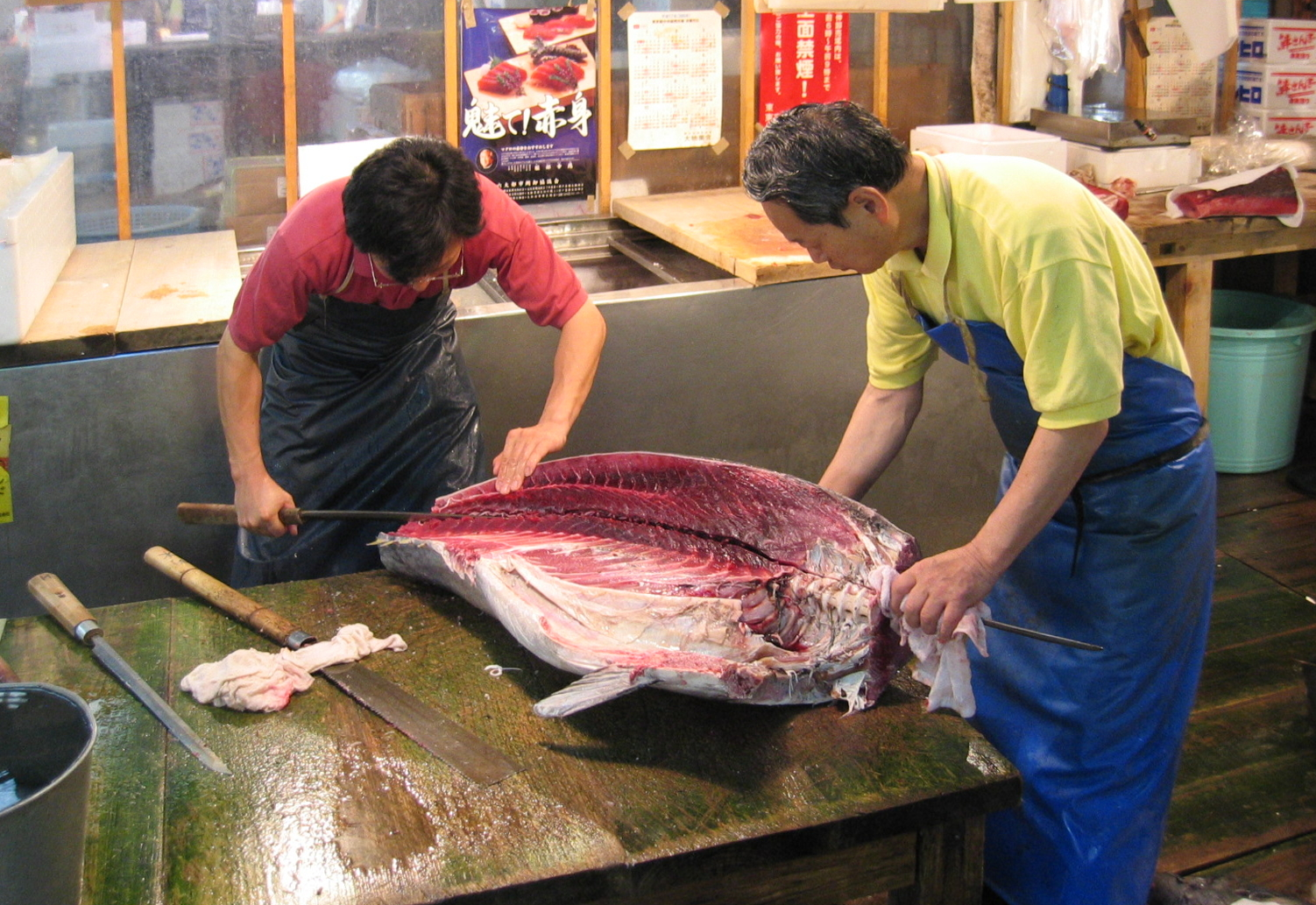
A magurobōchō in use at the Tsukiji fish market in Tokyo

A magurobōchō (Japanese: 鮪包丁; lit. 'tuna knife'), or magurokiribōchō (鮪切り包丁; lit. 'tuna cutter knife'), is an extremely long, highly specialized Japanese knife that is commonly used to fillet tuna, as well as many other types of large ocean fish.

The magurobōchō is a long knife with a blade length of 30 cm (12 inches) to 150 cm (60 inches) in addition to a long handle. It can fillet a tuna in a single cut, although usually two people are needed to handle the knife and the tuna. Often they are used by two people simultaneously, where the second person handles the other end, using a towel wrapped around the blade for protection. The flexible blade can be curved to match the shape of the spine to minimize the amount of meat remaining on the tuna carcass.

They are commonly found at wholesale fish markets in Japan, the largest of which is the Tsukiji fish market in Tokyo, for which they are often called oroshi-hōchō (卸包丁; lit. '"wholesale knife"'), as there is little need for them elsewhere. They may be found at very large restaurants, but they are not used in a regular Japanese kitchen, unless there is a frequent need to fillet tuna with a weight of 200 kg (440 pounds) or more.

== See also ==
- Japanese kitchen knife
