= Toyosu Market =

Wholesale market in Tokyo, Japan

- 豊洲市場
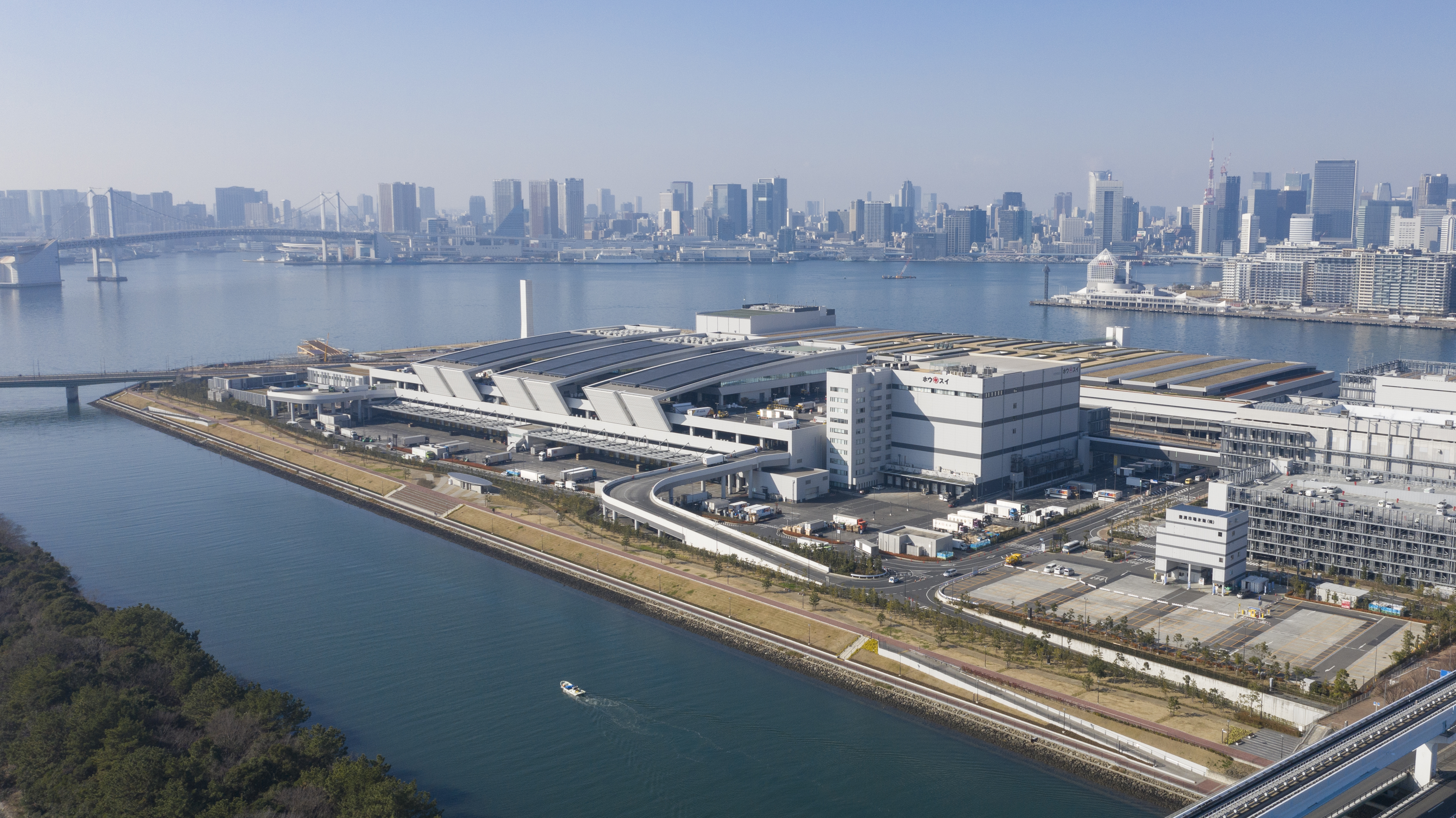
- Aerial view of Toyosu Market

General information
- Status: Complete
- Type: Wholesale market
- Location: 6 Chome-3 Toyosu, Kōtō, Tokyo 135-0061
- Coordinates: 35°38′36″N 139°46′54″E
- Construction started: 2016; 10 years ago
- Completed: 2018; 8 years ago
- Opening: 11 October 2018; 8 years ago
- Cost: $5 billion

Technical details
- Floor count: 6
- Floor area: 408,000 m^{2} (4,391,675 ft^{2})

Design and construction
- Architect: Nikken Sekkei

The Toyosu Market (豊洲市場, Toyosu Shijō) is a wholesale market in Tokyo, located in the Toyosu area of the Kōtō ward. There are two markets for seafood, one for general wholesale and one for bidding, and one market for fruits and vegetables, with each in its own building. Tourists can observe the auction market on a second floor viewing deck. There are restaurants with fresh seafood and produce from the market and shops (魚河岸横丁 uogashi yokocho). The market is built on reclaimed land in Tokyo Bay, and replaces the historic Tsukiji fish market, which now is a major tourist attraction. Auction tours, events, merchandise sales and restaurants can be used by general consumers and tourists. When it opened on 11 October 2018, it became the largest wholesale fish market in the world.

== Prices ==
The Toyosu Market, along with other smaller markets, is operated by the Tokyo Metropolitan Government. The wholesale prices of seafood, fruits and vegetables, flowers and meat at each of these markets are published on the Tokyo Central Wholesale Market official website in Japanese only.

== History ==
The old Tsukiji fish market occupied valuable real estate close to the center of the city. Former Tokyo Governor Shintaro Ishihara repeatedly called for moving the market to Toyosu, Koto. The new Toyosu Market cost $5 billion to build. The long-anticipated move to the new market was scheduled to take place in November 2016, in preparation for the 2020 Summer Olympics, but on August 31, 2016, the move was postponed. There had been concerns that the new location was heavily polluted and needed to be cleaned up, and toxic substances were discovered in the soil and groundwater at Toyosu, due to the gas plant that was previously located on the property. The Tokyo Metropolitan Government spent an additional 3.8 billion yen ($33.5 million) to pump out groundwater by digging hundreds of wells. In June 2017, plans to move the fish market were restarted, but delayed in July to the autumn of 2018. After the new site was declared safe following a cleanup operation, the opening date of the new market was set for 11 October 2018. The grand opening was on 11 October 2018. It opened to the general public on 13 October 2018.

In Tsukiji there are plans to retain a retail market, roughly a quarter of the current operation, and the remaining area of the market will be redeveloped.

During the first auction of Toyosu Market on January 5, 2019, businessman Kiyoshi Kimura, president of Kiyomura Corp which operates the Sushi-Zanmai chain, paid a record highest bid of 333.6 million yen ($3.08 million) for a 278 kilogram (612 pound) Pacific bluefin tuna. On January, Kimura paid 193.2 million yen ($1.79 million) for a 276 kilogram bluefin tuna. This tuna was caught near Ōma, Aomori Prefecture.

On January 4, 2026, a 243 kg (536 lb) bluefin tuna was sold for a record ¥510 million (US$3.2 million).

== Facility ==
There are three markets: a wholesale market for consumers, an auction market, and a fruit and vegetable market. There are about 40 food stalls in the wholesale fish buildings, most of which are located above the market, and accessible to visitors. The new complex also includes a large rooftop terrace with lawns. Nikken Sekkei designed the Fishery Naka Wholesale Building, Fishery Wholesale Building, and Fruit and Vegetable Building. At 408,000 m^{2} (4,391,675 ft^{2}), Toyosu Market is almost twice the size of the old Tsukiji fish market.

Unlike the previous Tsukiji fish market, the public cannot attend the auction at floor level among buyers. Instead, visitors can watch the market from a second floor viewing deck or, upon registration, from a room at the same level separated from the auction by a window. There is a shrine titled Uogashi Suijinja (shrine for a fish market on the shore) at the corner of the Toyosu buildings near the waterfront. The rooftop, accessible by elevator, includes a terrace with landscaping and panoramic views of parts of Tokyo's skyline. Eating or drinking are not allowed on the roof.

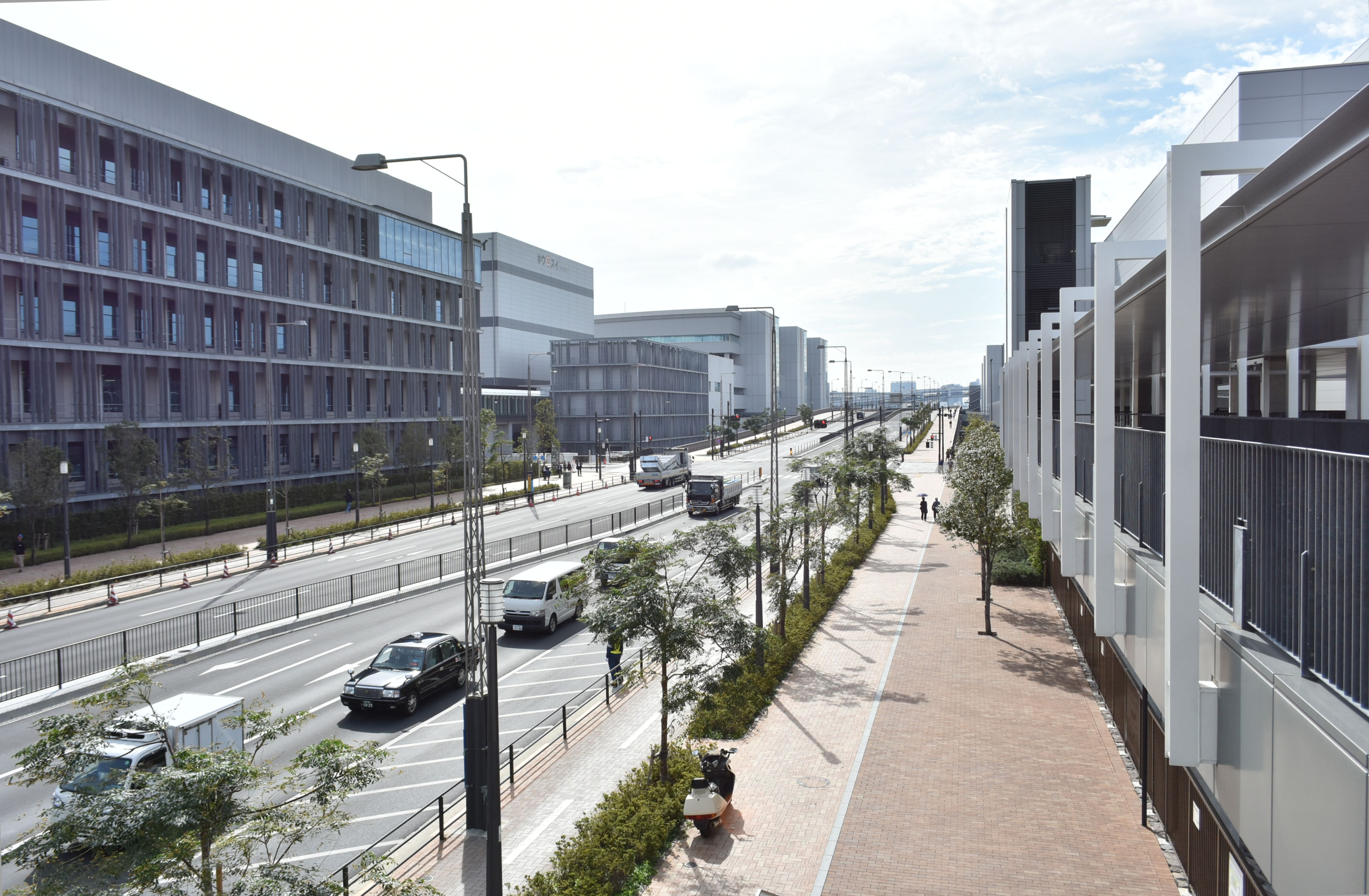
“Management Facility Building” and the “Fisheries Wholesale Building” at the back of the Toyosu Market “Fisheries Naka Wholesale Building”

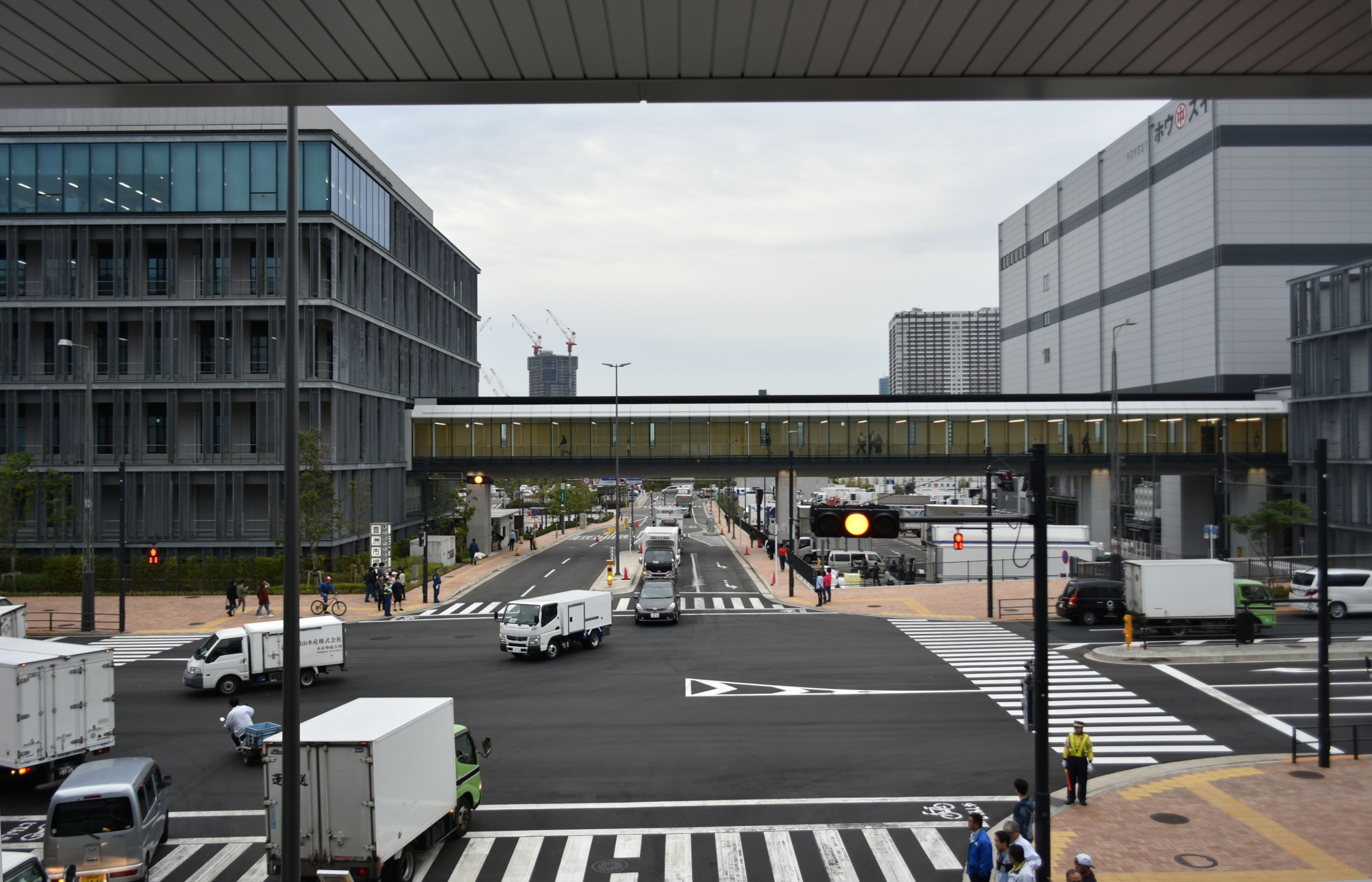
The Ariake area on the south side of the “Ranji-dori” passage

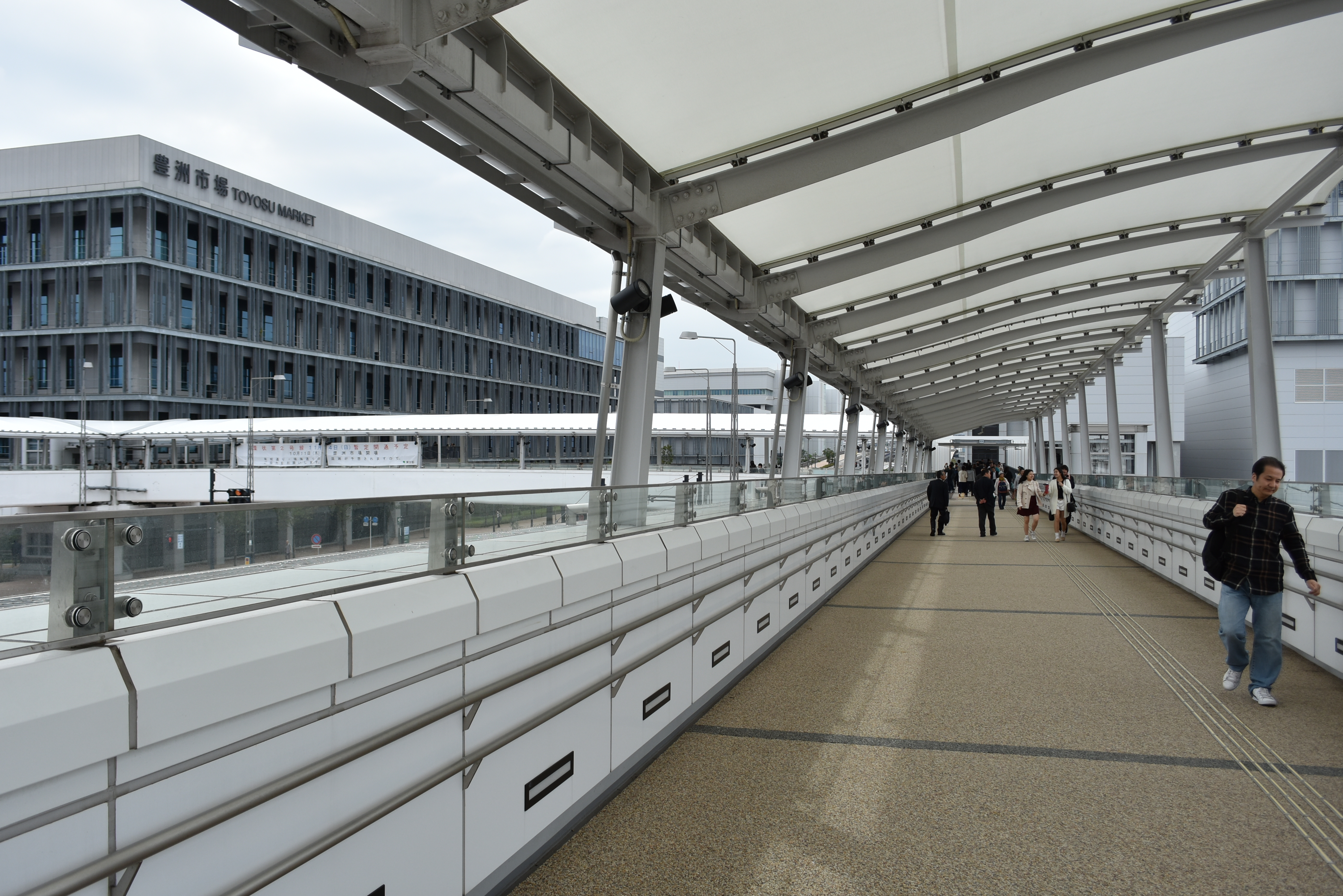
The visitor's walkway from the station in front of the market to the “Fisheries Naka Wholesale Hall”

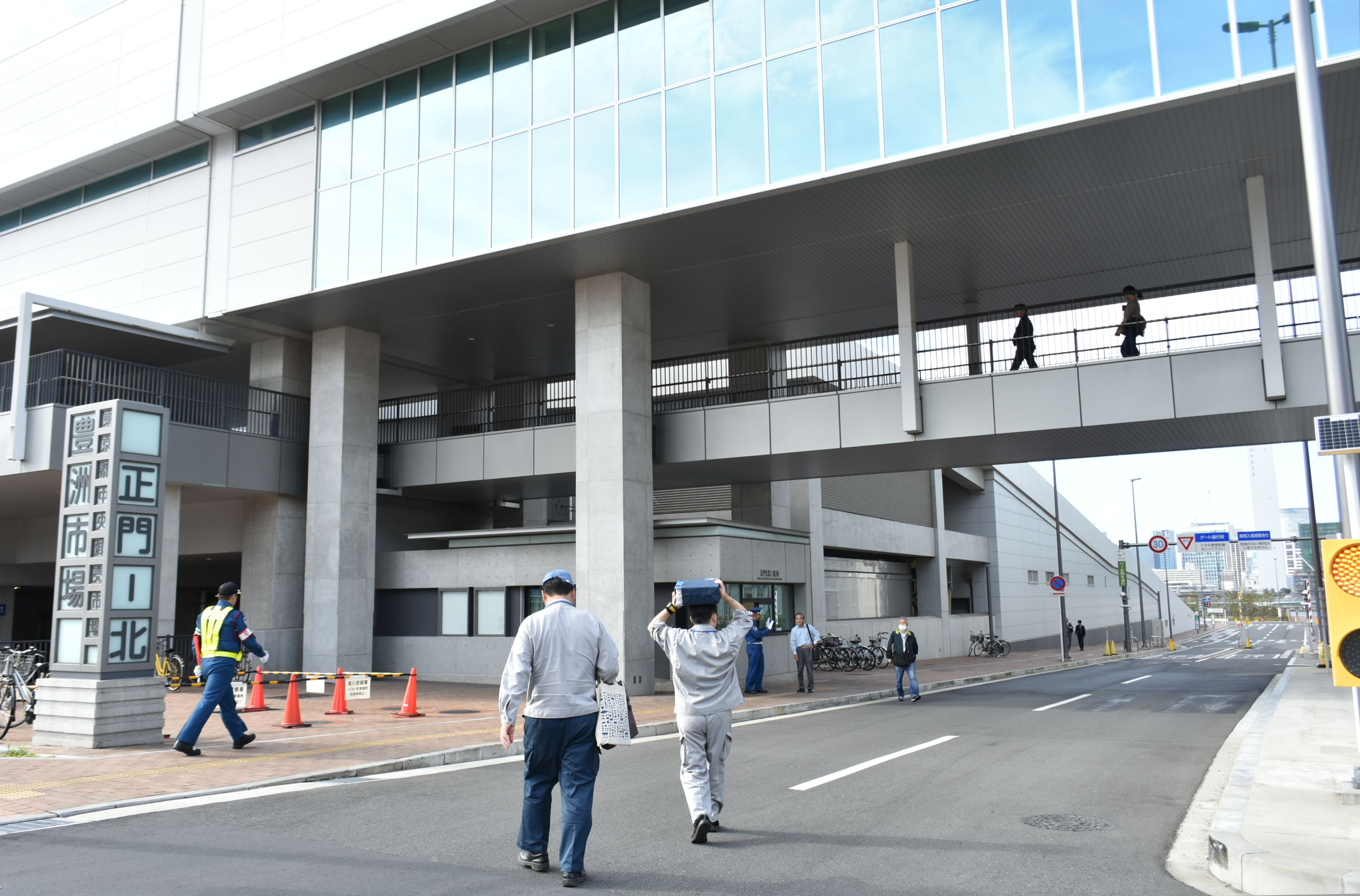
Main gate north of Toyosu Market on the 1st floor of “Fisheries Naka Wholesale Hall”

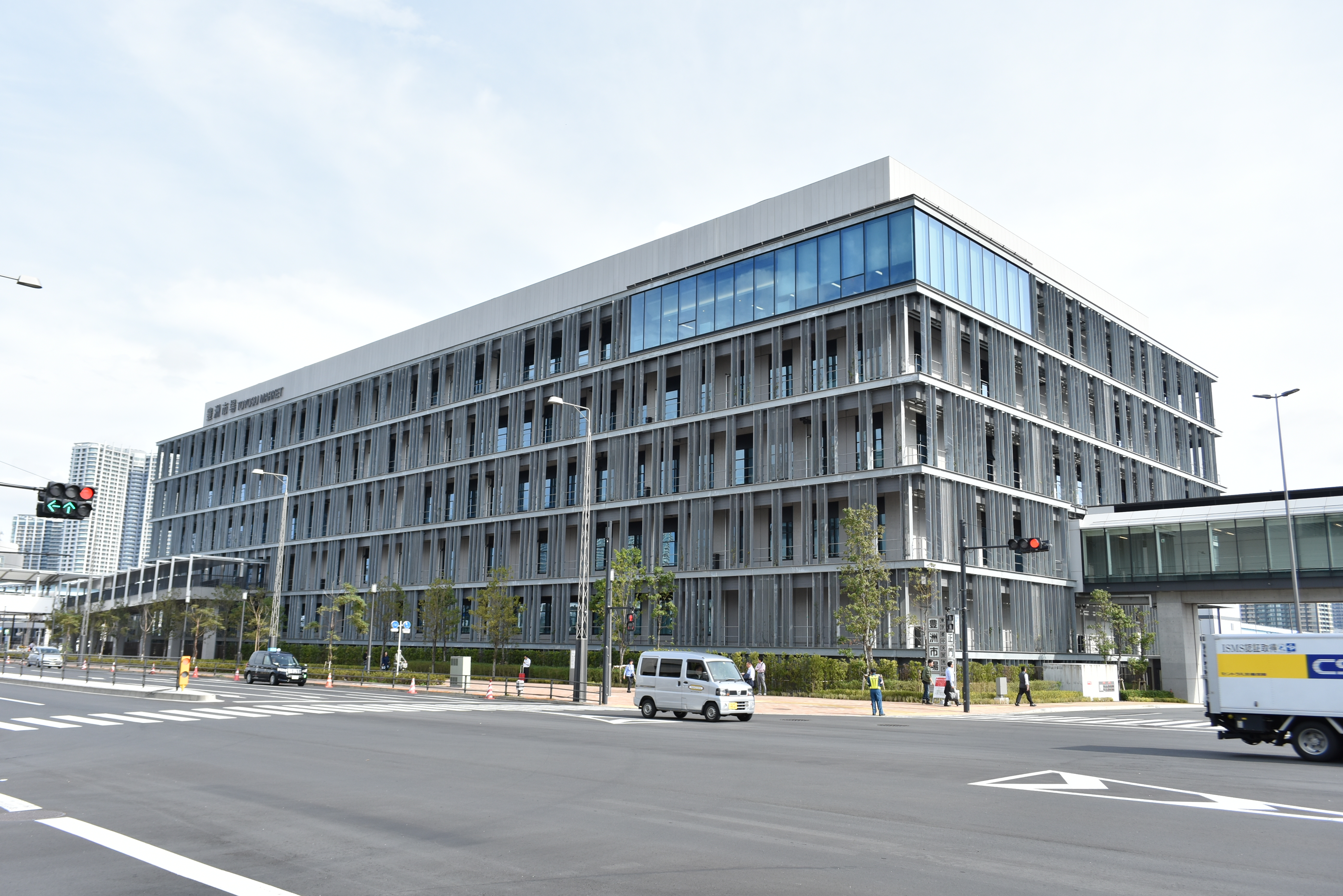
View the “Management Facility Building” from the front of the “Fisheries Naka Wholesale Hall”

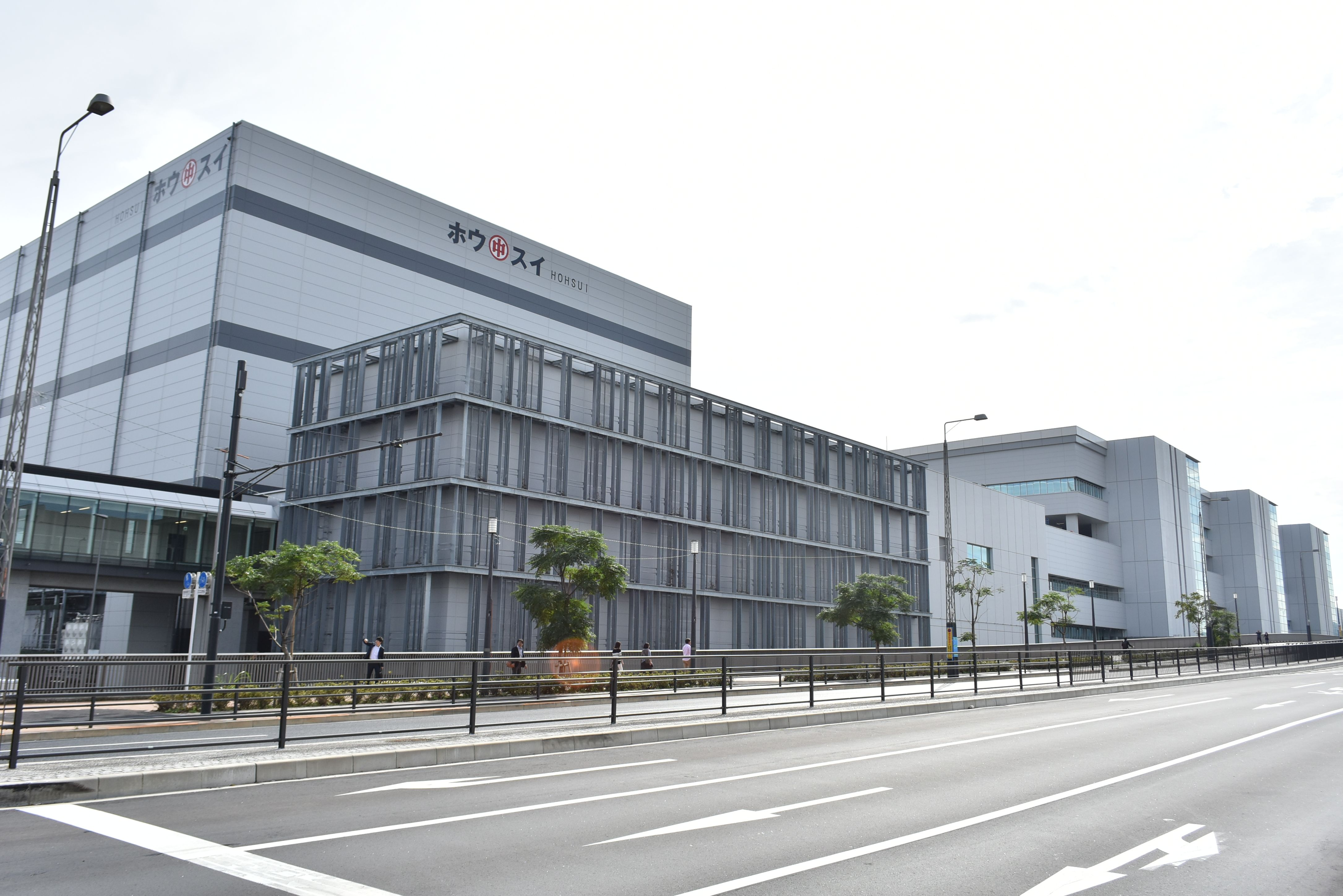
View of the “Fisheries Wholesale Building” in front of the “Fisheries Naka Wholesale Building”

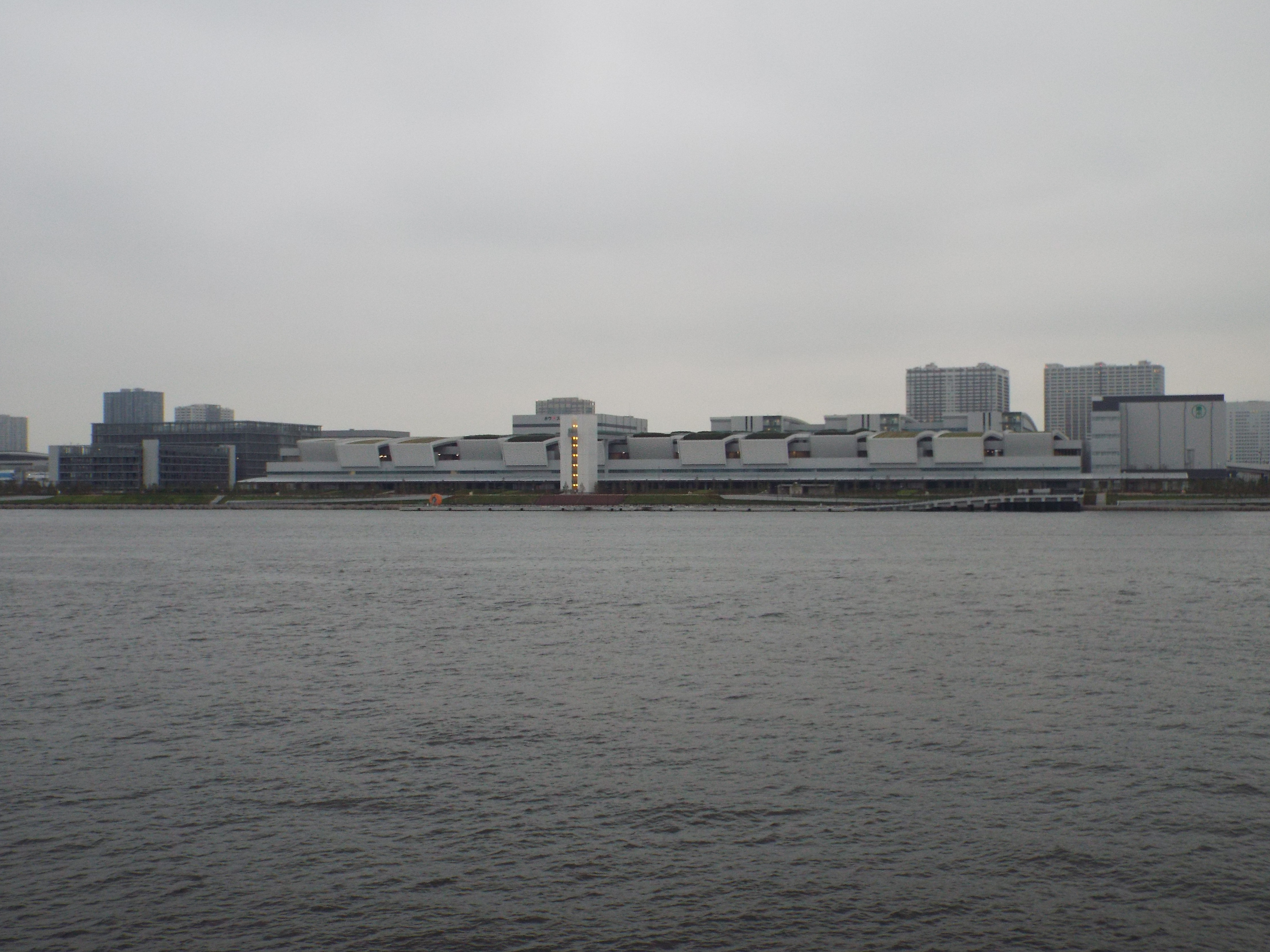
Toyosu Market seen from Tokyo Bay

== Access ==
Toyosu Market is located at 6 Chome-3 Toyosu, Kōtō ward, Tokyo 135-0061, Japan. It is open to the public. Toyosu Market is served by Shijō-mae Station on the Yurikamome line.

== Gallery ==
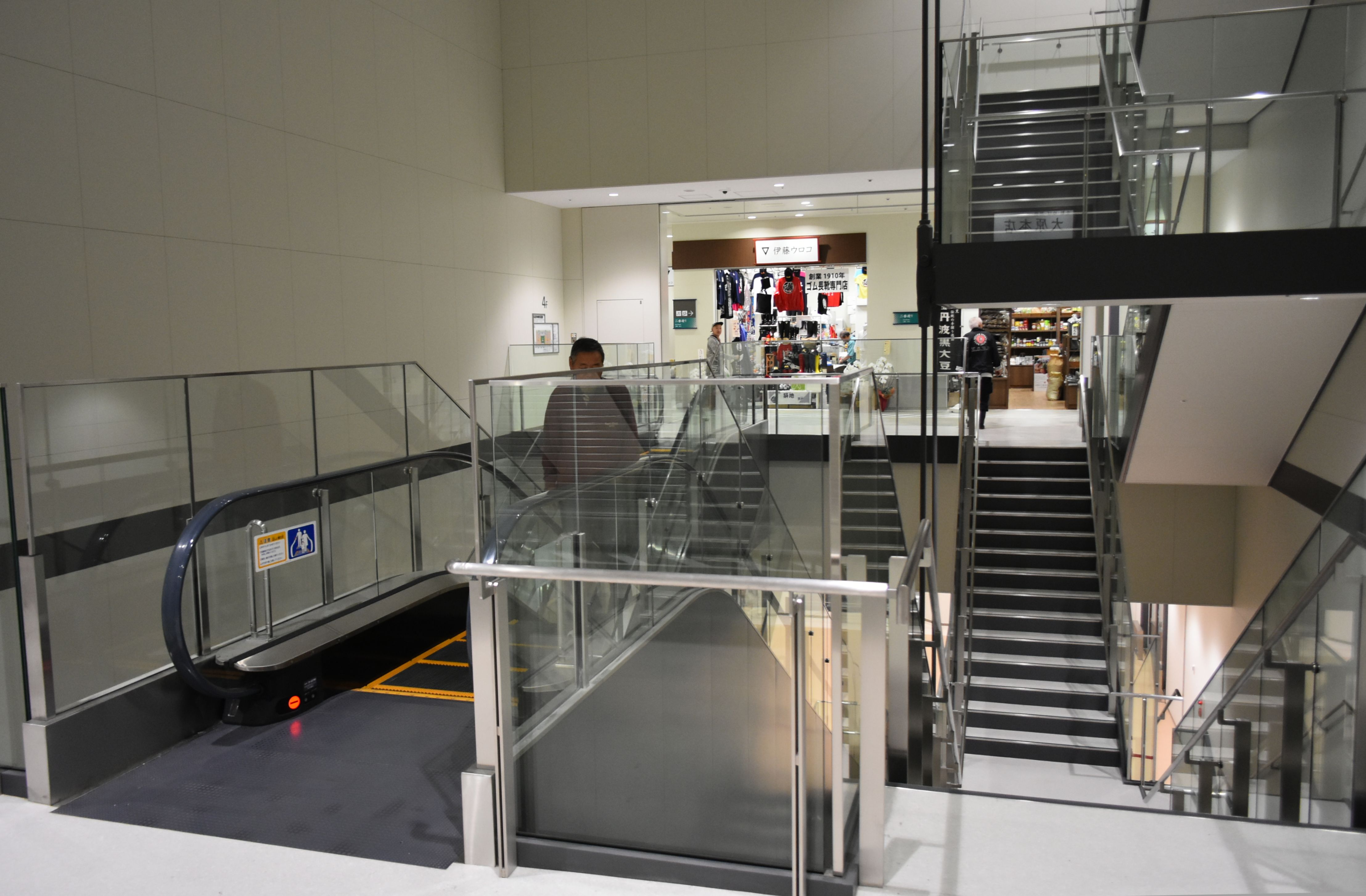
Fisheries Wholesale building stairs

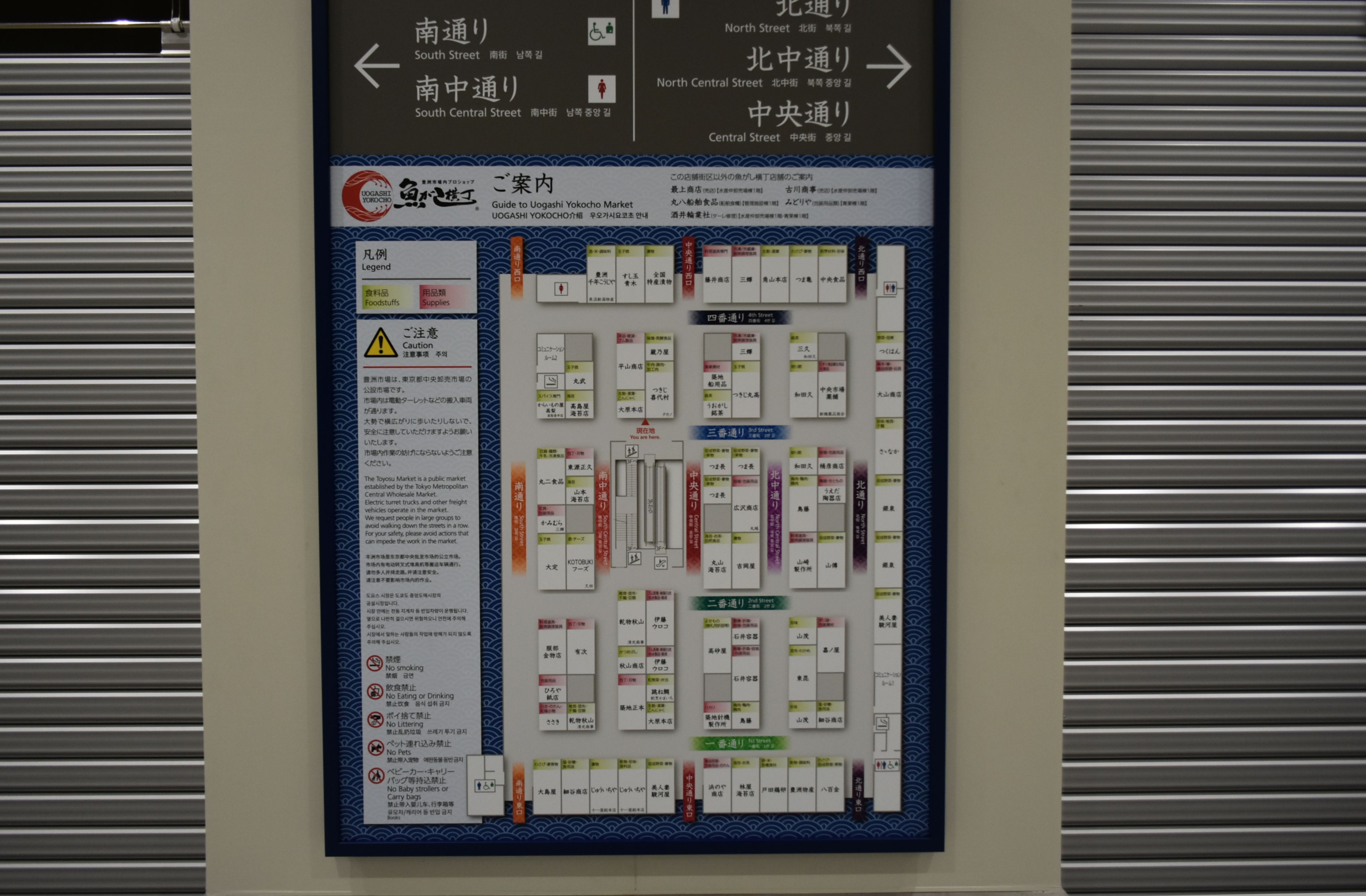
Guide board

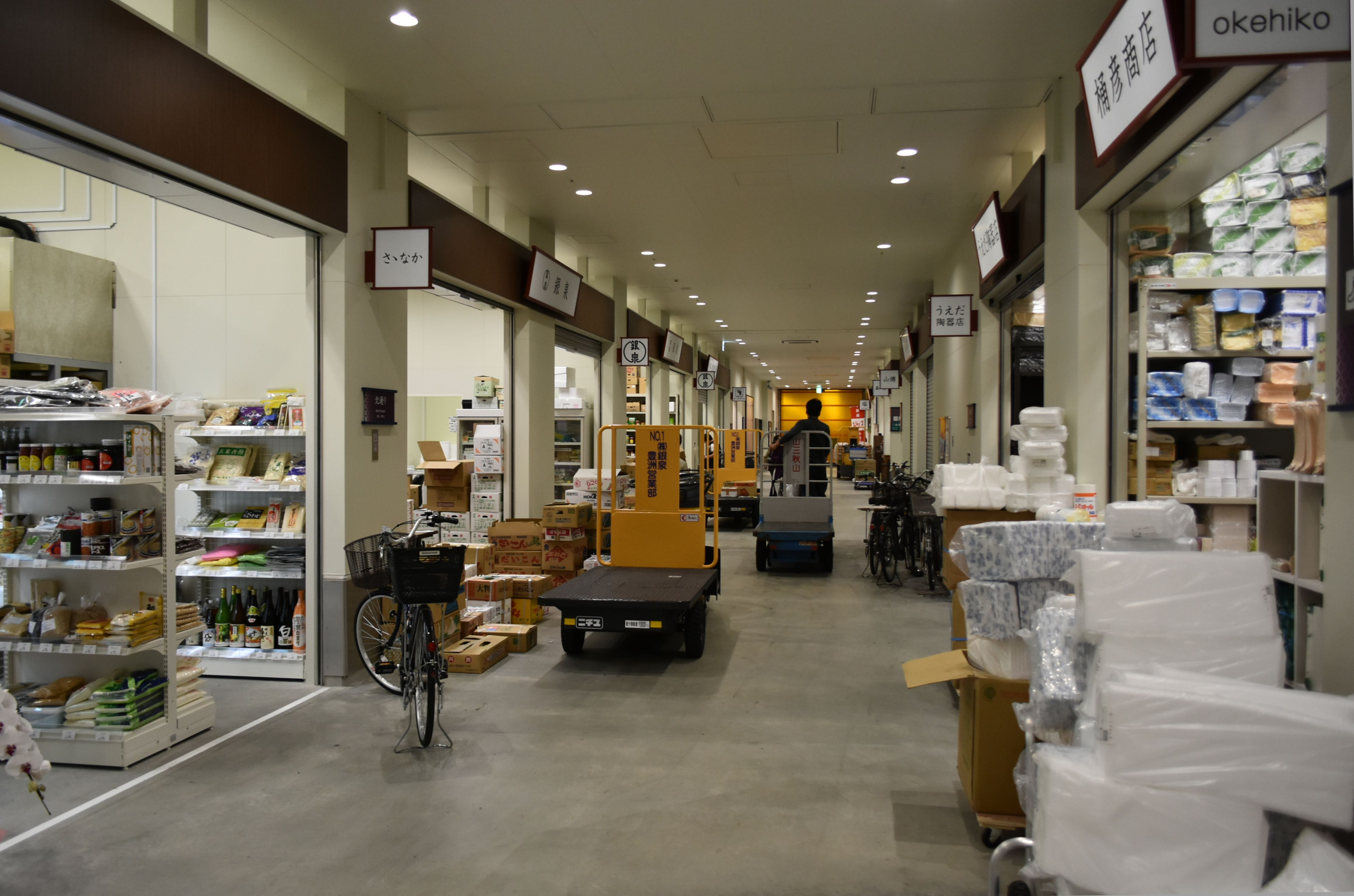
Stores on the 3rd floor

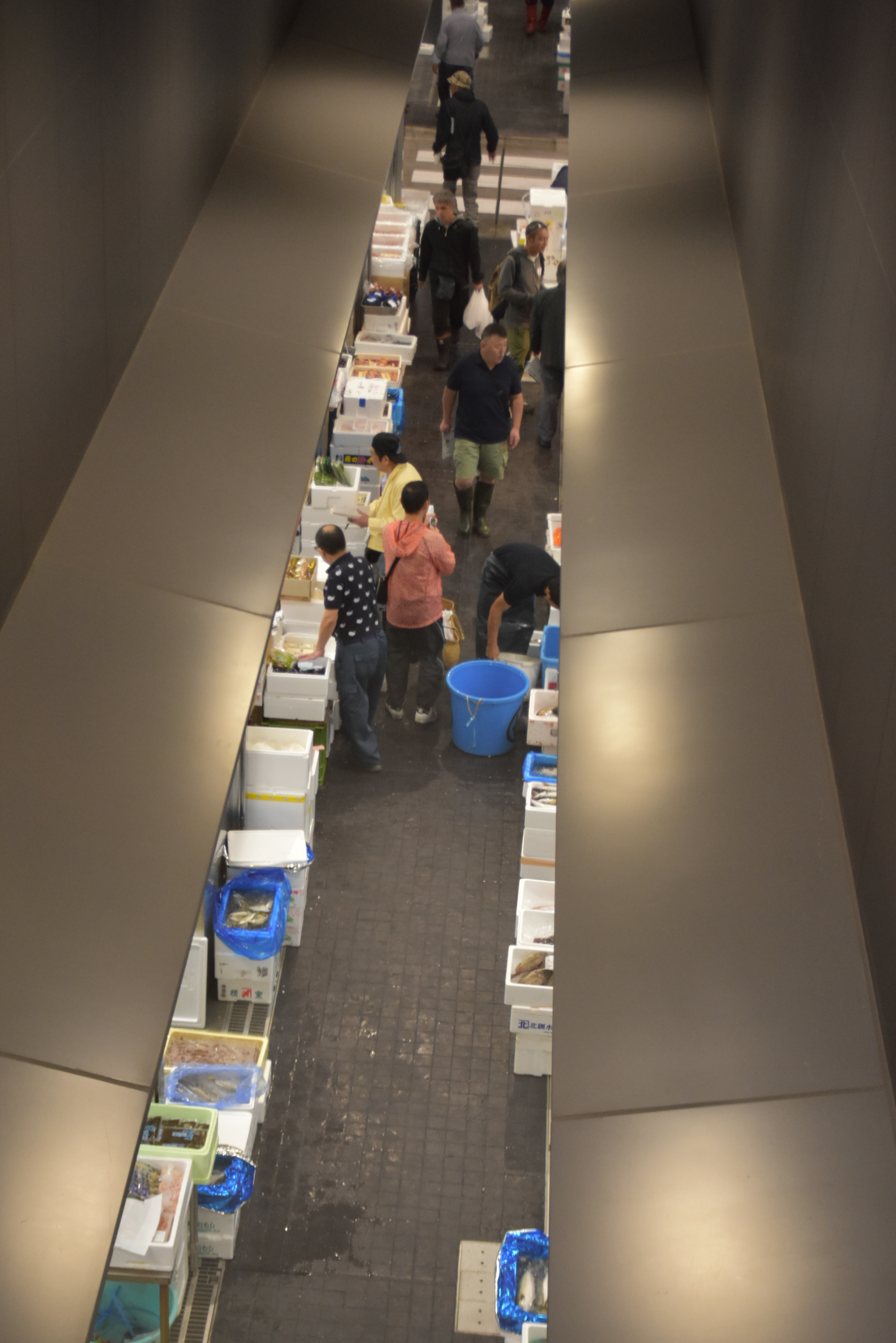
Overlooking the wholesale stores on the 2nd floor from the 3rd floor

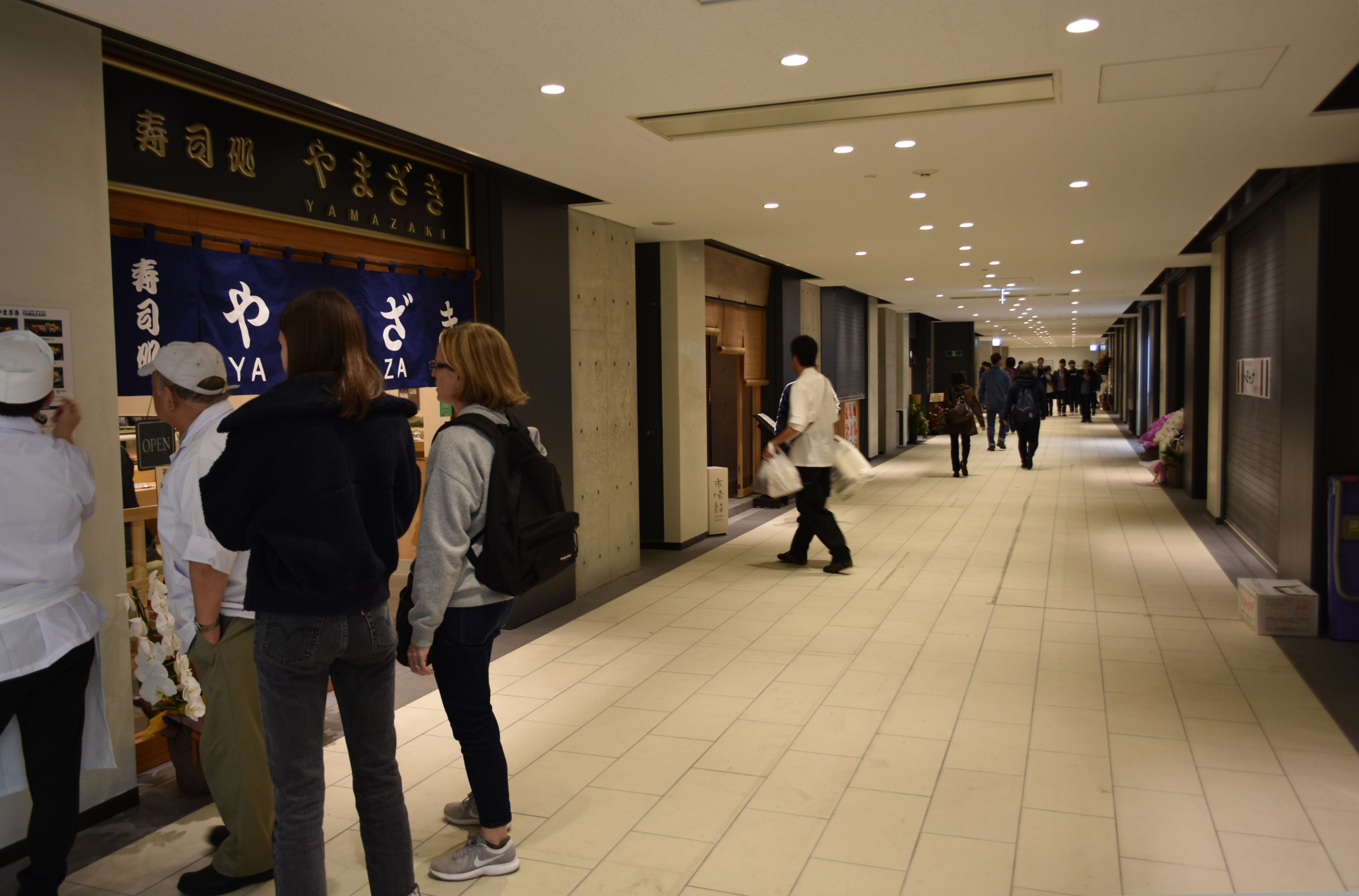
In-store eating and drinking establishment
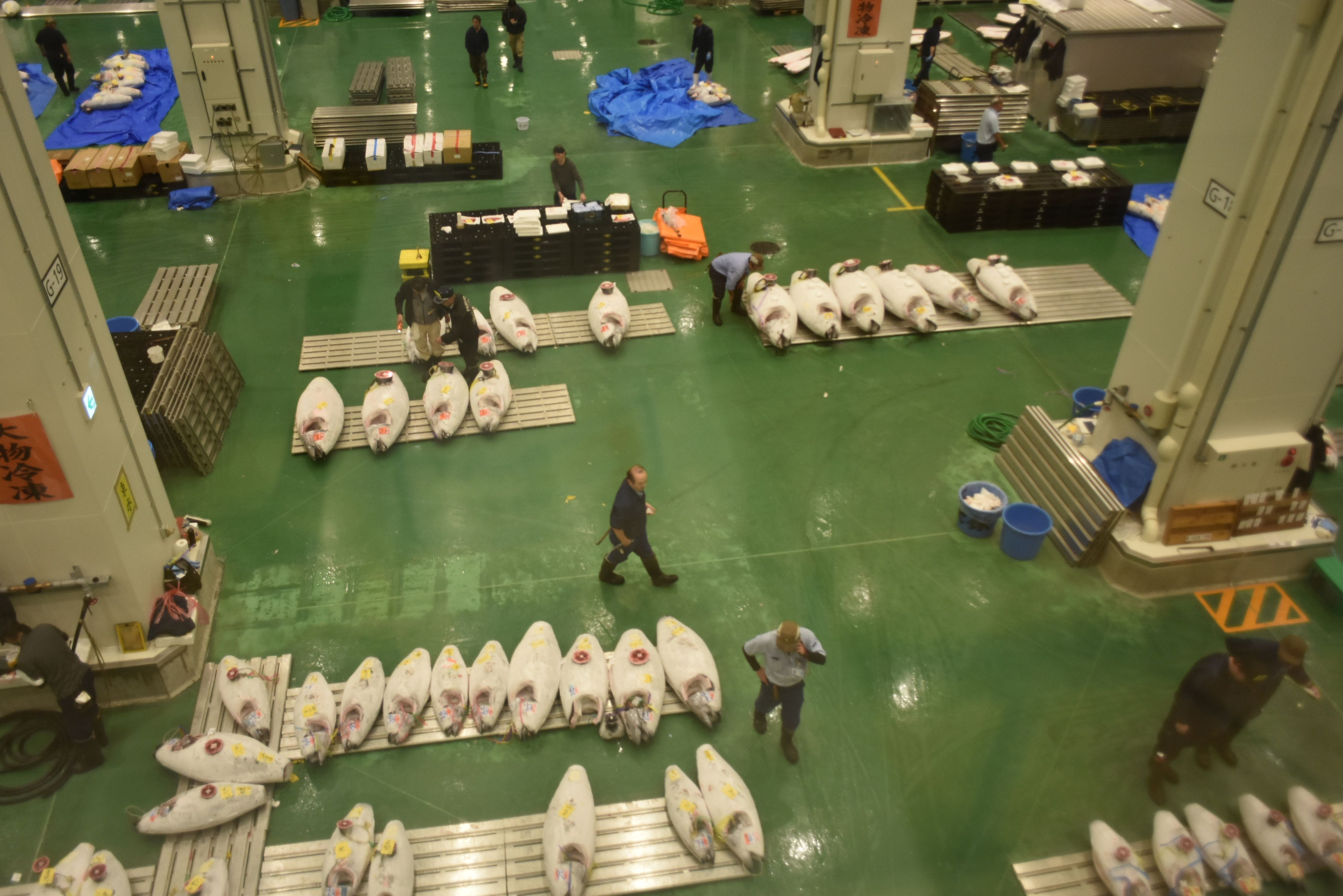
Fisheries wholesale building. Big frozen tuna

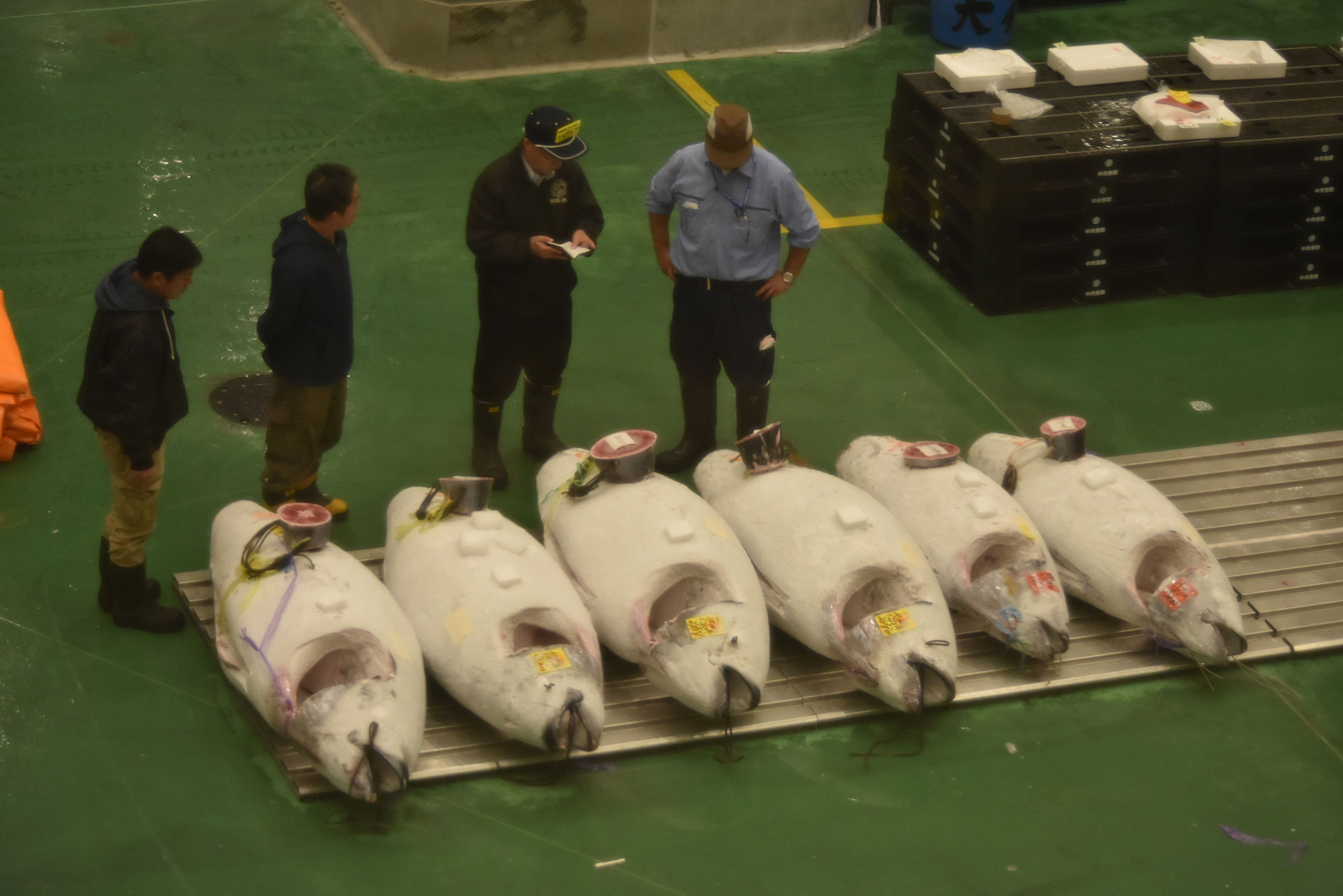
Big frozen tuna

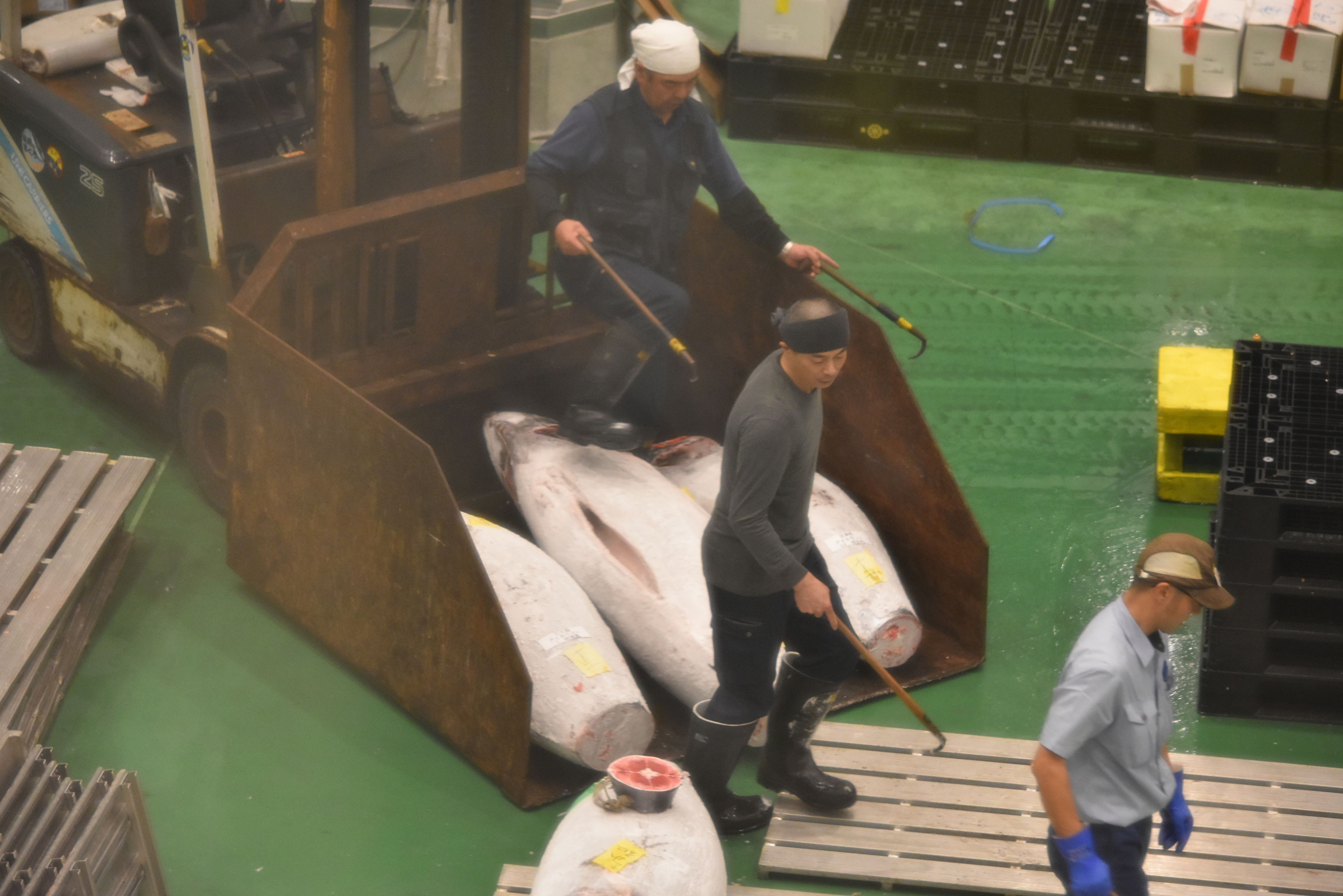
Transportation of big frozen tuna

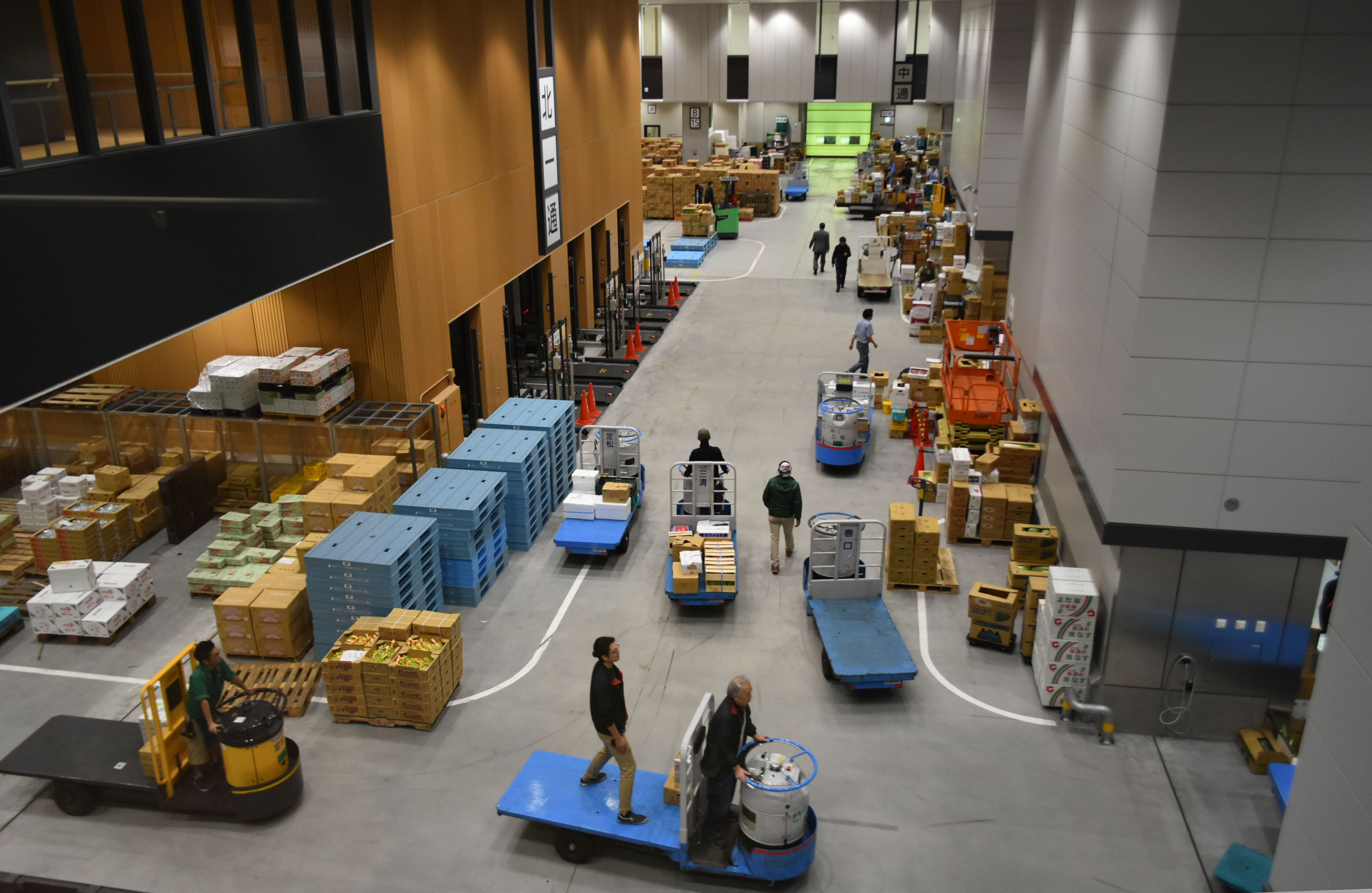
Storage

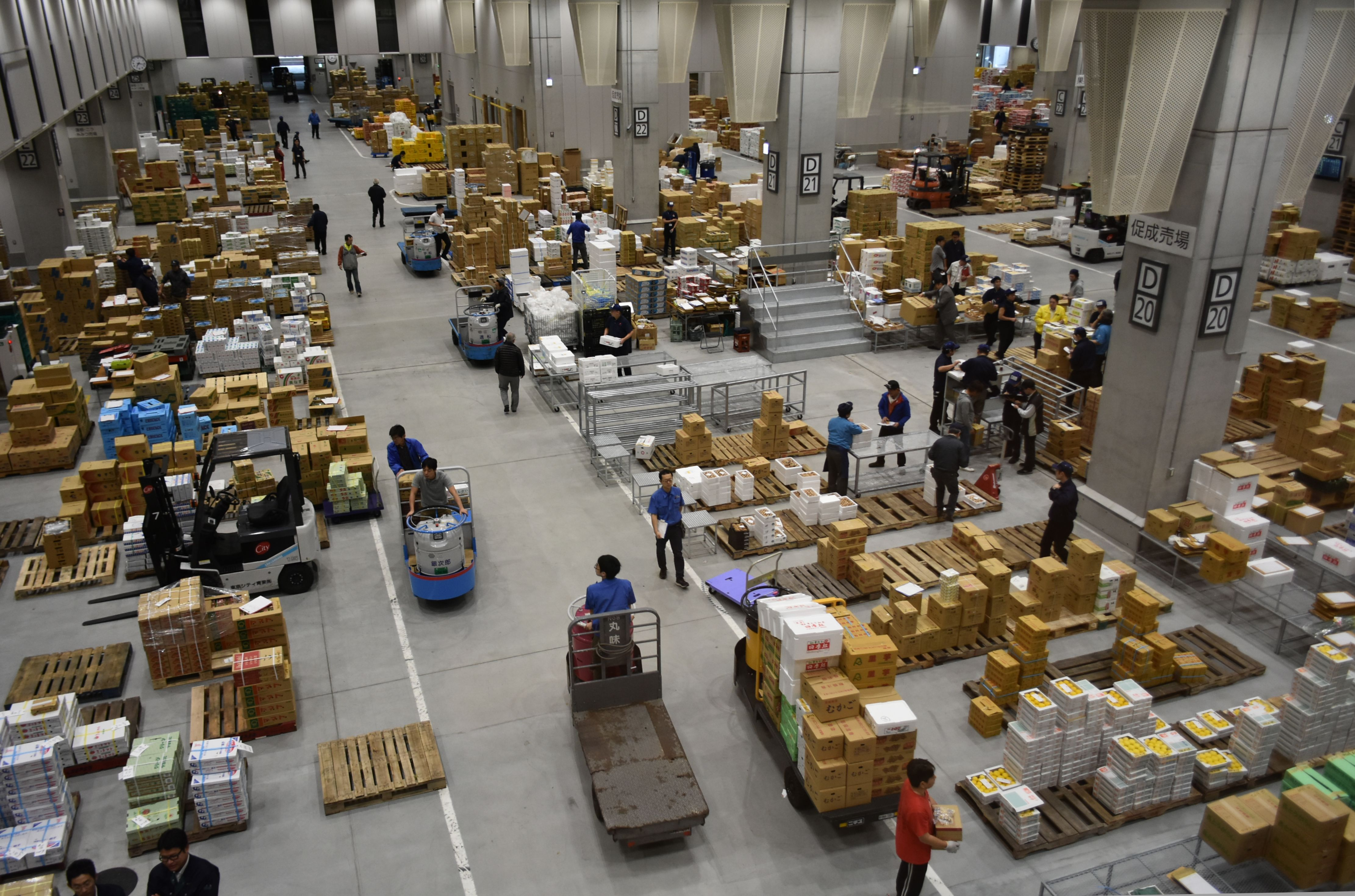
Storage
