= Tourism in Tokyo =

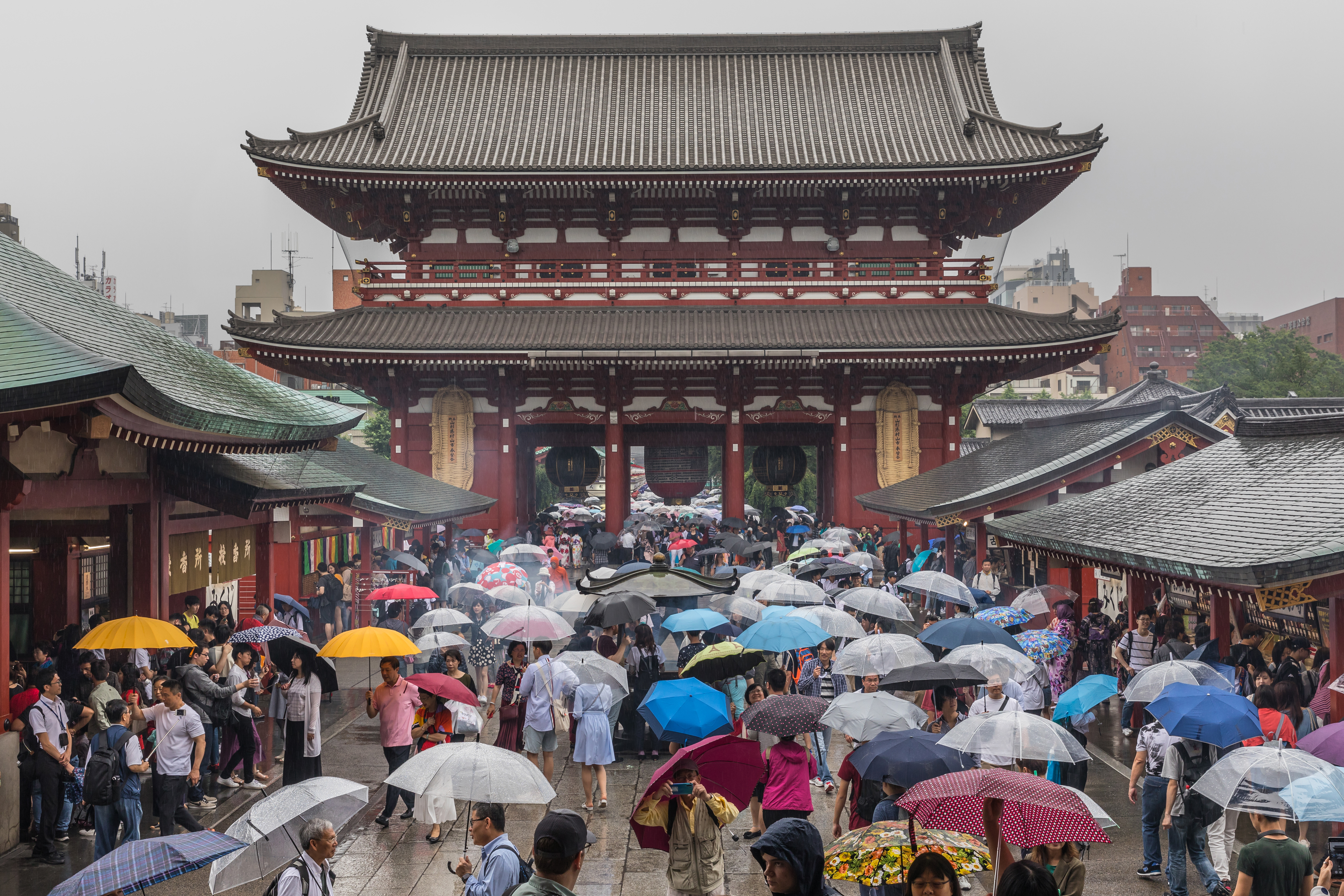
Tourists crowding Sensō-ji on a rainy day

Tourism is a major industry in Tokyo. In 2006, there were 420 million visits by Japanese people and 4.81 million visits by foreigners. The economic value of tourist visits to Tokyo totaled ¥9.4 trillion yen.

After a slow down due to closed borders due to COVID from early 2020 to the later part of 2020, in 2022 Tokyo saw a growth of 542 million visits to Tokyo by Japan residents, and 33.13 million visits from overseas.

Many tourists visit the various urban districts, stores, and entertainment districts throughout the neighborhoods of the special wards of Tokyo.

== Tourist destinations ==
Japanese schoolchildren on class trips typically visit Tokyo Tower. Cultural offerings in Tokyo include both omnipresent Japanese pop culture and associated districts such as Shibuya and Harajuku, subcultural attractions such as Studio Ghibli anime center. Tokyo National Museum houses over a third of the National Treasures of Japan. No buildings in Tokyo are listed as World Heritage Sites. Among buildings, only the Jizo Hall of Shofuku-ji, a suburban temple, is a National treasure. Apart from the top attractions like Tokyo Disneyland, DisneySea, Tokyo Tower, Skytree, other popular attractions include the Imperial Palace, Meiji Shrine, and Sensō-ji, a popular temple. Many tourists, particularly foreigners, visit Tsukiji Fish Market. Contrary to a common misconception, Tokyo has many green spaces in the city center and its suburbs.

A list of the popular places and attractions for the visitors is as follows:

- Akihabara
- Yanaka District
- Kagurazaka
- Kiyosumi Gardens
- Tsukiji Fish Market’s Outer Market
- Sake Breweries in Tokyo
- Roppongi: Art galleries and Nightlife
- Odaiba
- TeamLab Borderless Digital Museum
- Ghibli Museum
- Kappabashi Kitchen Town
- Shimokitazawa
- Sumida river boat cruises
- Nakano Broadway
- Hama-Rikyu Gardens
- Ueno Park
- Themed Cafés
- Edo-Tokyo Open Air Architectural Museum
- Harajuku
- Daikanyama

== Transportation and Hotel Districts ==
Access to Tokyo is provided by airports including Narita Airport, Tokyo International Airport (Haneda, providing primarily domestic service) for both international and domestic tourists. Shinkansen is the most popular mode of transport for travelers from other Japanese cities.

The transportation from the airports to various districts of Tokyo include trains and Airport Limousine busses.

Major hotel districts include Shinjuku and Tokyo Bay, although there are hotels in all the districts, all over Tokyo.

== See other ==
- Architecture in Tokyo
- Festivals in Tokyo
- List of parks and gardens in Tokyo
- List of museums in Tokyo
- Special wards of Tokyo
- Sports in Tokyo
- Tourism in Japan
