= Tama New Town =

Japanese residential development

Coordinates: 35.6239451°N 139.4228727°E

Tama New Town (多摩ニュータウン, Tama Nyūtaun) is a large residential development, straddling the municipalities of Hachiōji, Tama, Inagi and Machida cities, in Tokyo, Japan. It was designed as a new town in 1965. It is approximately 14 kilometers (8.7 mi) long stretching east-west, and between 1 kilometer (0.62 mi) and 3 km (1.9 mi) wide, located in an expanse of hills known as Tama Hills about 20 kilometers (12 mi) west of the center of the special wards of Tokyo.

It currently has a population of about 200,000, making it the largest housing development in Japan.

== History ==
During the Japanese post-war economic miracle, a rapid influx of population into Tokyo led land prices to skyrocket, causing many to settle on the cheaper outskirts of the city, leading to an unplanned, rapid urban sprawl. It was feared that, left to its own devices, the uncontrolled expansion of built-up areas would lead to poorly planned communities with insufficient infrastructure to support the population and with poor access to amenities and transport. Tama New Town was planned in 1965 to attempt to ease this pressure by providing hundreds of thousands with housing in a planned, pleasant urban environment. The planning and development was carried out jointly by The Housing and Urban Development Corporation, Tokyo Metropolitan Housing Supply Corporation and Tokyo Metropolitan Government.

The original planned population was 342,200, and the designated area was 2,892.1 hectares. Construction began the following year and the first phase opened in 1971. Construction continued in phases for the next few decades.

== Urban design and facilities ==
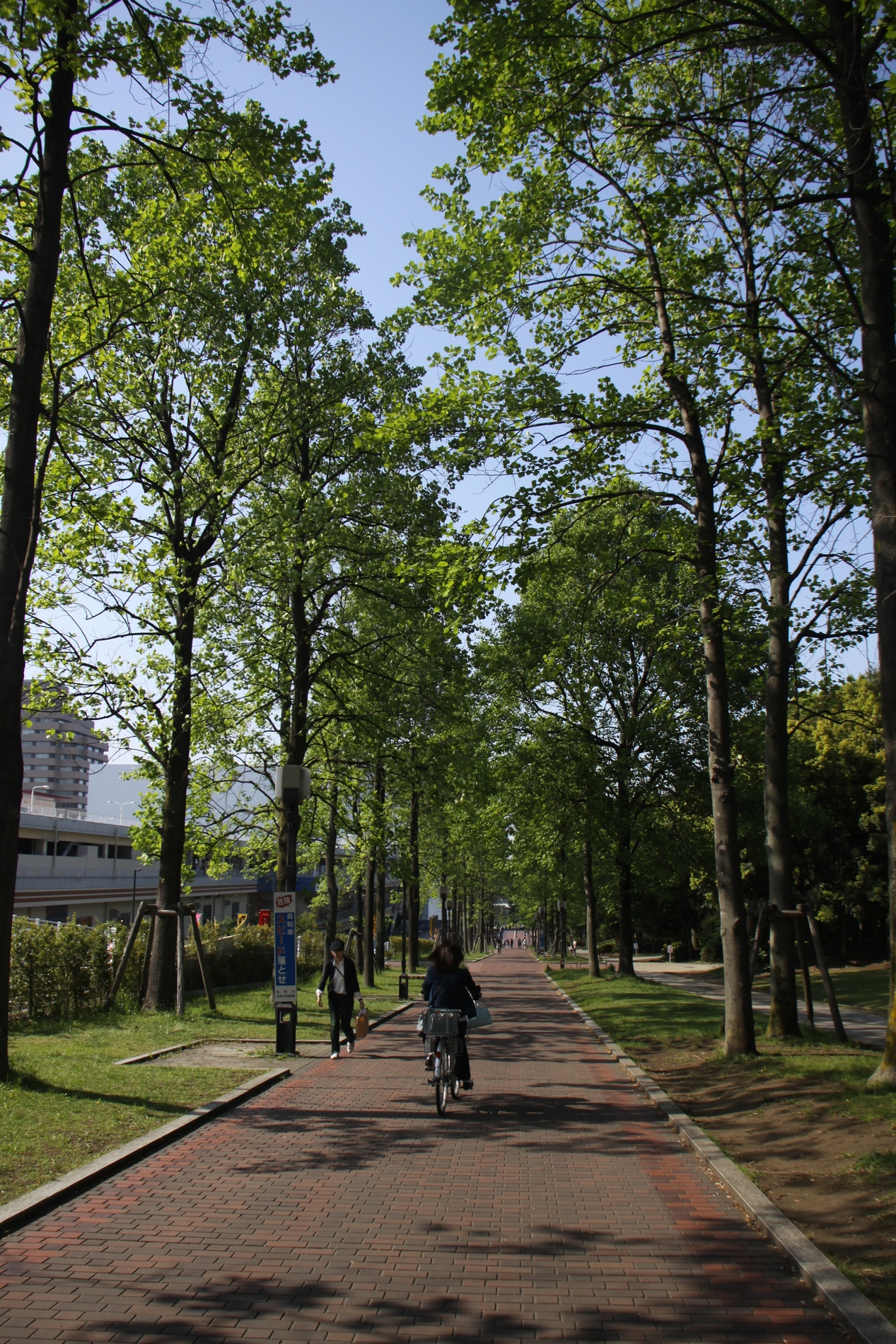
Part of the master plan was to segregate motor vehicle and pedestrian traffic

It is divided into 21 neighborhoods, each with about 3000 to 5000 houses and apartments, each with two elementary schools and one junior high school as well as a neighborhood center with shops, kōban, post office, clinics and the like. Several neighborhoods form one district, each of which are centered on a commuter rail station.

Tama New Town is not a municipality in itself; instead, it straddles the pre-existing boundaries of Tama, Hachiōji, Inagi and Machida cities, and each area is administered by its respective municipal authorities, all of which come under the jurisdiction of Tokyo Metropolis.

=== Tama Center ===
The area surrounding the Tama Center Station complex, in the municipality of Tama, is the designated center of Tama New Town. The area is separated into business, commercial and leisure zones.

Tama Center Station itself is serviced by the Tama Toshi Monorail Line, as well as the Keio Sagamihara and Odakyu Tama Lines which link it to Shinjuku Station in central Tokyo. The station complex also includes shopping arcades and a bus terminal.

- Parthenon Avenue, the main thoroughfare of the Tama Center area famous for its winter illuminations, stretches southwards from the station. In the vicinity are retail, business and leisure complexes, hotels, Tama City Central Police Station, an indoor theme park (Sanrio Puroland), Warner-Mycal Cinema cineplex, Tama Art University Gallery, Tama TV and Tama South District Hospital.
- Parthenon Tama, a huge culture center, is located at the end of Parthenon Avenue. The building, nicknamed so after Parthenon in Greece because of its hilltop location, houses a free museum about the history of Tama New Town. Behind Parthenon Tama lies Tama Central Park (Tama Chuo Koen) and a neighbouring Shinto shrine.

=== Other districts ===
Other notable hubs in Tama New Town include:

- Within Tama city: The area surrounding Nagayama Station, comprising several retail complexes such as Greenade Nagayama, as well as Nagayama Civic Hall.
- Within Inagi city: The area surrounding Wakabadai Station has developed rapidly in recent years following the completion of the final phase of Tama New Town to the north of the station. Multiple retail complexes have opened since 2004, as well as a planned culture complex including a 400-seat auditorium, library, and a children's center.
- Within Hachiōji city: The new Greenwalk Tama shopping center opened in spring 2007, about 2.5 km southwest of Tama Center, along the main east-west highway.

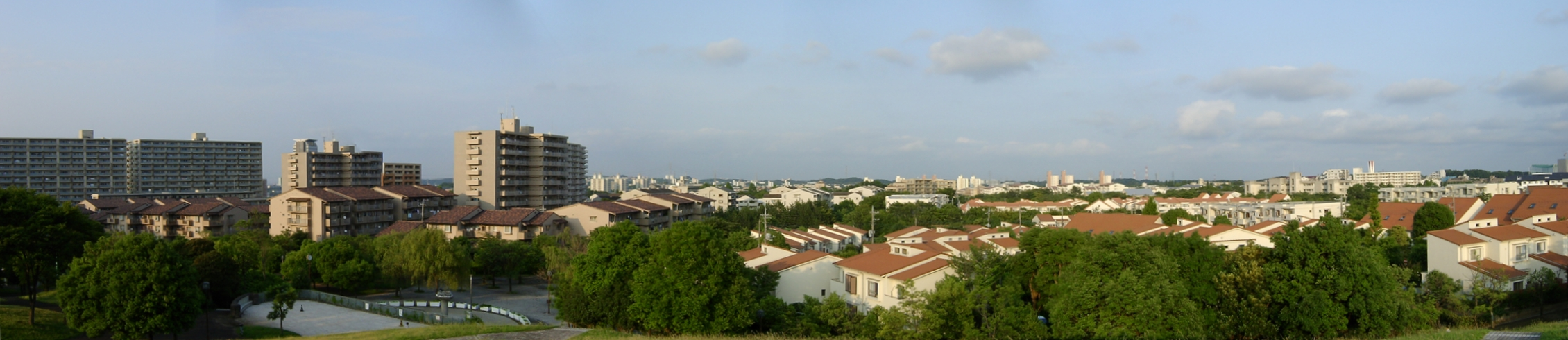
Panoramic view of Tama New Town

== Transportation ==
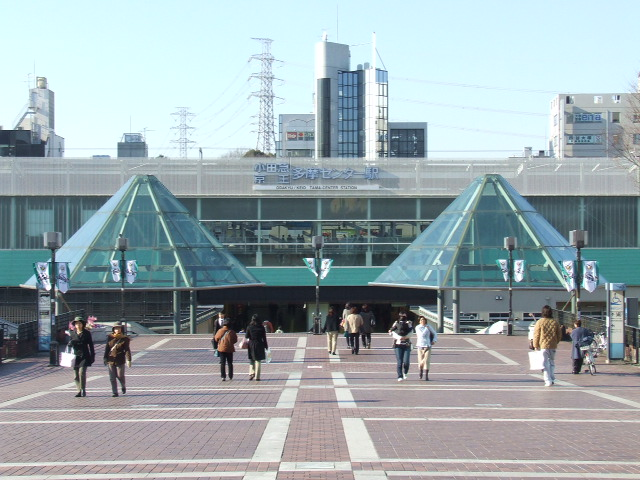
Tama-Center Station, served by Keio Sagamihara Line, Odakyu Tama Line and Tama Toshi Monorail

Tama New Town is served by more than ten railway stations, most of them on the Keio Sagamihara Line and Odakyu Tama Line, both of which provide a direct service to Shinjuku Station in central Tokyo. JR Nambu Line and Tama Toshi Monorail Line also serve the area.

== Higher education ==
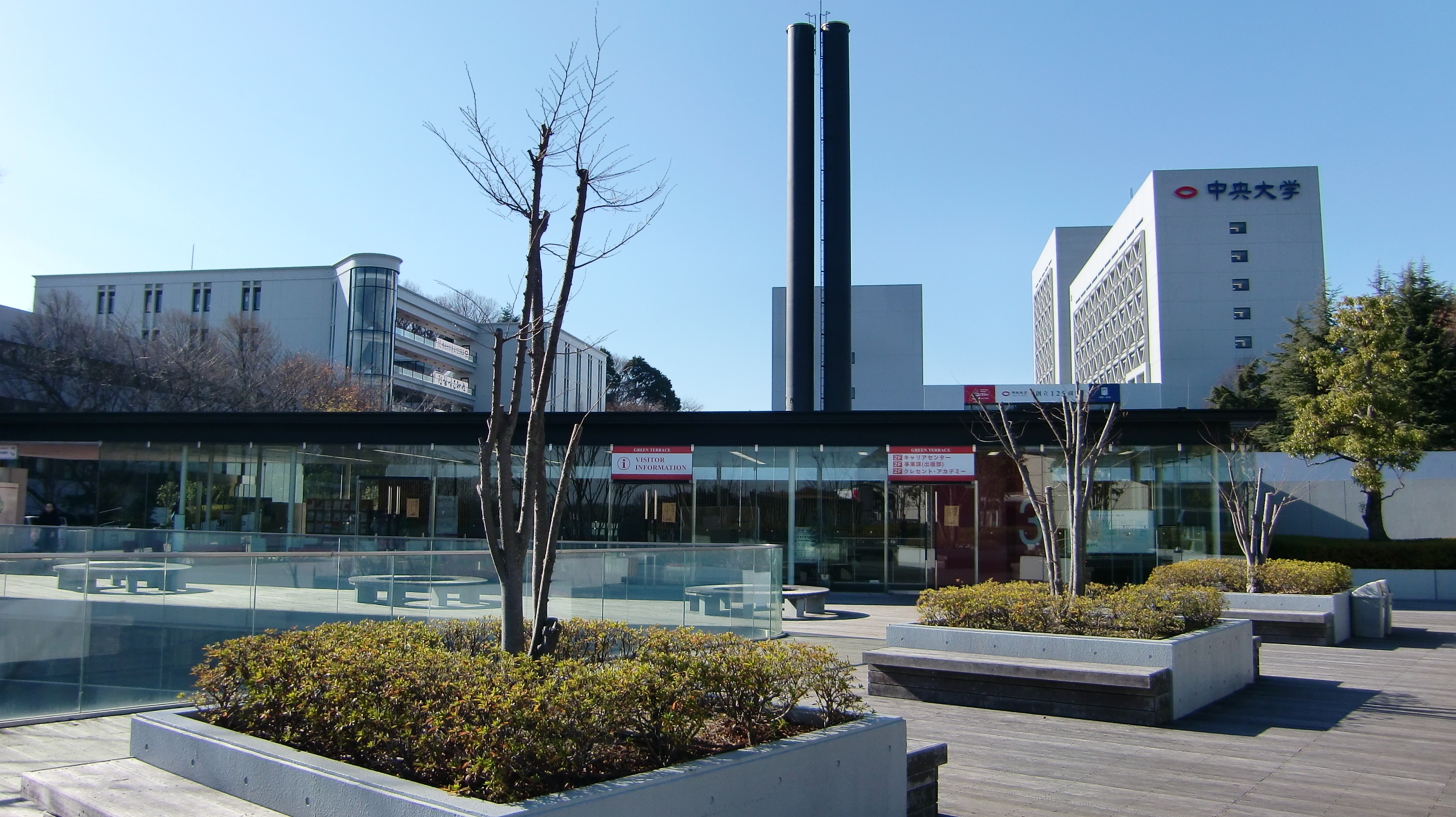
Chuo University

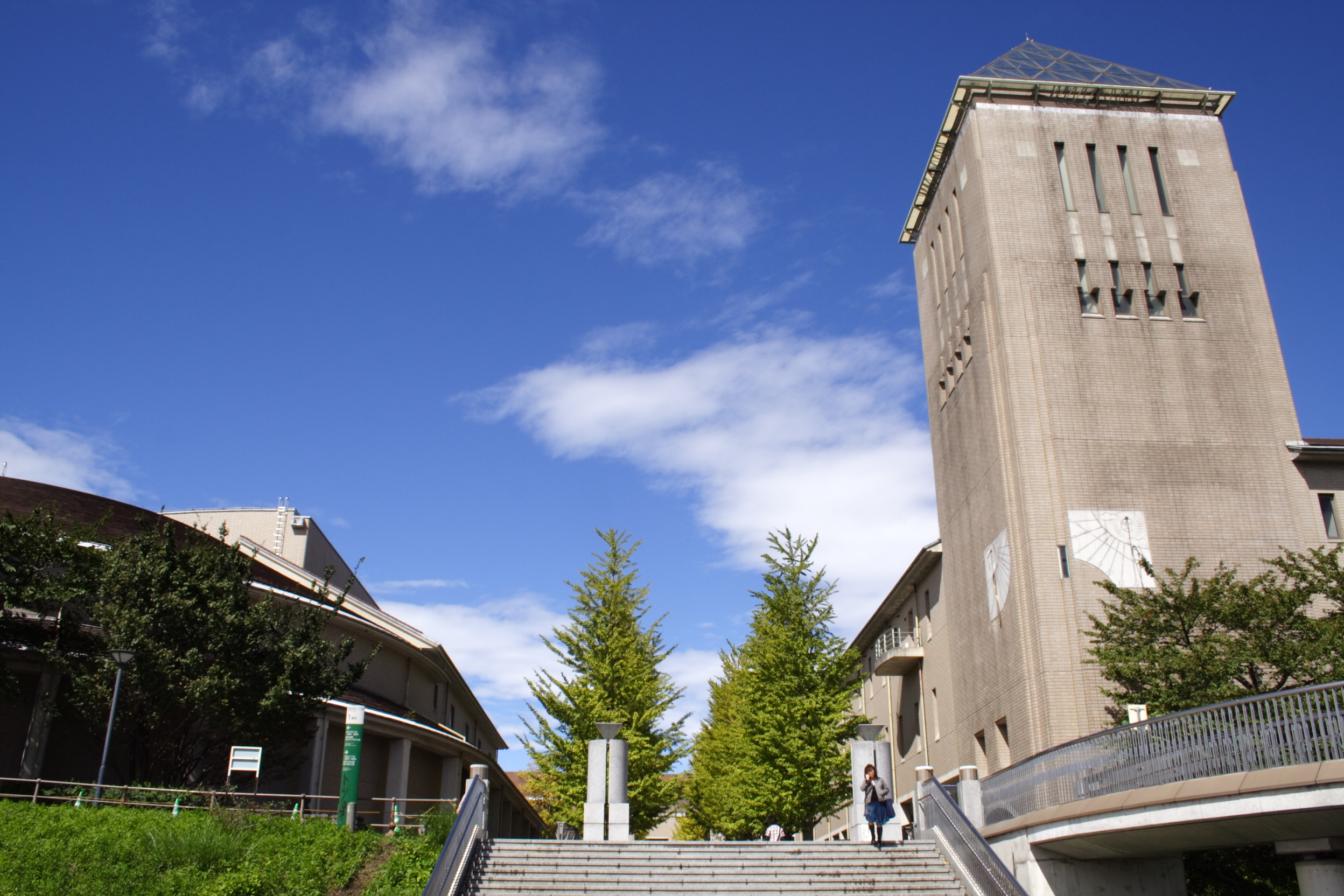
Tokyo Metropolitan University

Tama New Town is home to 16 university and college campuses.

- Chuo University
- Digital Hollywood University
- Keisen University
- Kokushikan University
- Komazawa Women's University
- Komazawa Women's Junior College
- Meisei University
- Otsuma Women's University
- Salesian Polytechnic
- Tama Art University
- Teikyo University
- Tokyo Metropolitan University (Public)
- Tokyo University of Pharmacy and Life Sciences
- University of Tokyo Health Sciences
- Yamazaki College of Animal Health Technology

== Media ==
Tama Television (TTV) is a cable TV and internet provider, servicing the Tama New Town area as well as other parts of Tama and Inagi municipalities, and has its own channel providing community news and the like.

FM Tama G-Wind (77.6 MHz/10W) is the radio station dedicated to the local area.

== In popular culture ==
The town has appeared in two Studio Ghibli films- the studio itself also being located in western Tokyo.

- Pom Poko (1994) depicts the expansion of Tama New Town in the 1960s through the eyes of shapeshifting Japanese raccoon dogs and their attempts to stop it.
- Whisper of the Heart (1995) is largely set around the Seiseki-Sakuragaoka Station, although the area is depicted as more developed than it was when the film was made.

Outside of Ghibli works:

- The 2022 novella Escape from Yokai Land by Charles Stross is set in the Sanrio Puroland theme park in Tama New Town, where a supernatural manifestation of Hello Kitty is on the verge of becoming a full blown kaiju.
- The 2022 film Remembering Every Night, directed by Yui Kiyohara, is set entirely in Tama New Town. It features an ensemble cast roaming around the area - effectively turning Tama New Town into the protagonist.
