= TeamLab (art collective) =

Japanese art collective

teamLab
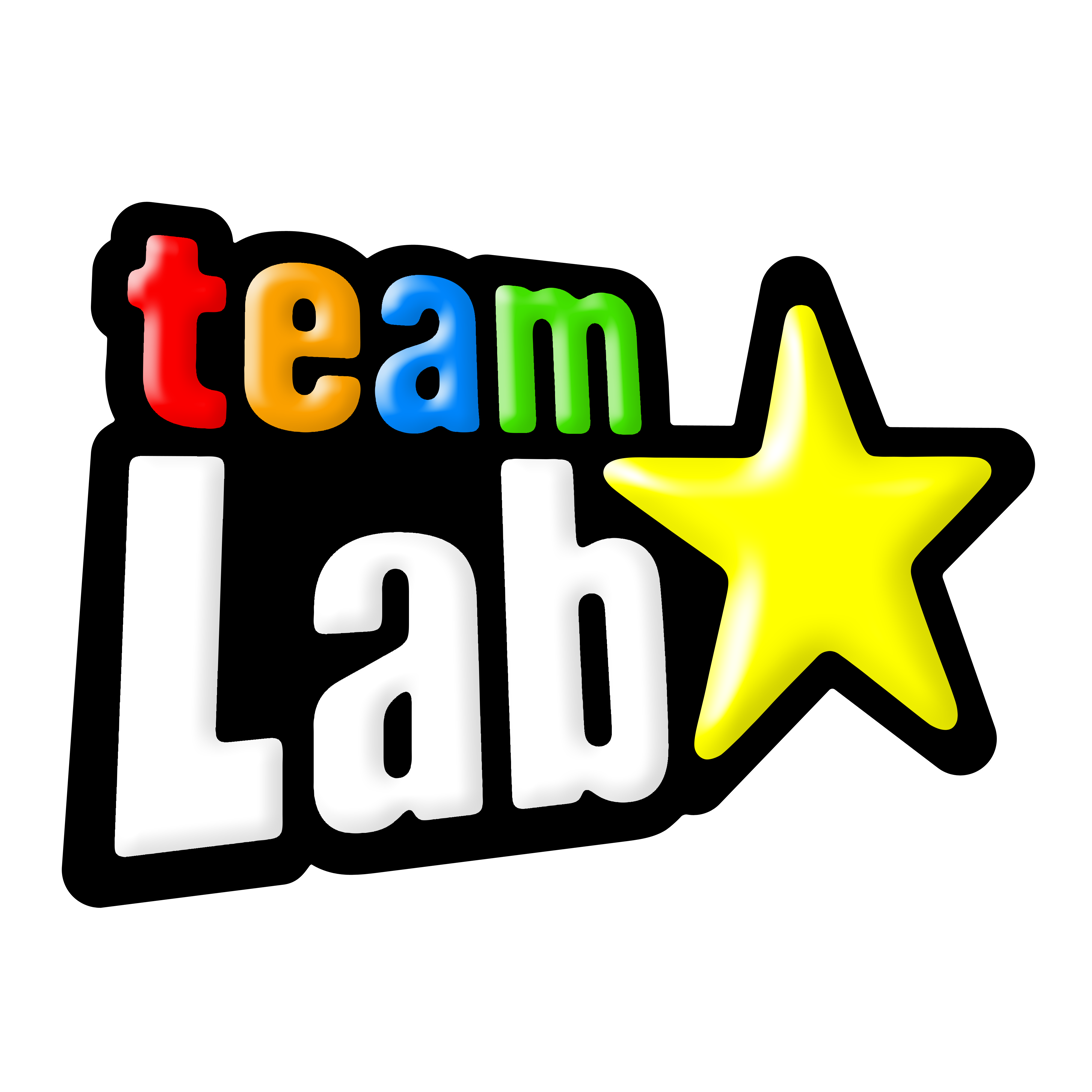
- The logo of teamLab
- Established: 2001
- Founder: Toshiyuki Inoko; Shunsuke Aoki
- Headquarters: Tokyo, Japan
- Location: International
- Website: www.teamlab.art

TeamLab (stylized as teamLab) is an international artist collective created by an interdisciplinary group of artists formed in 2001 in Tokyo, Japan. The group consists of artists, programmers, engineers, CG animators, mathematicians and architects who refer to themselves as “ultra-technologists". TeamLab creates artworks using digital technology. Since 2014, TeamLab is represented by Pace Gallery.

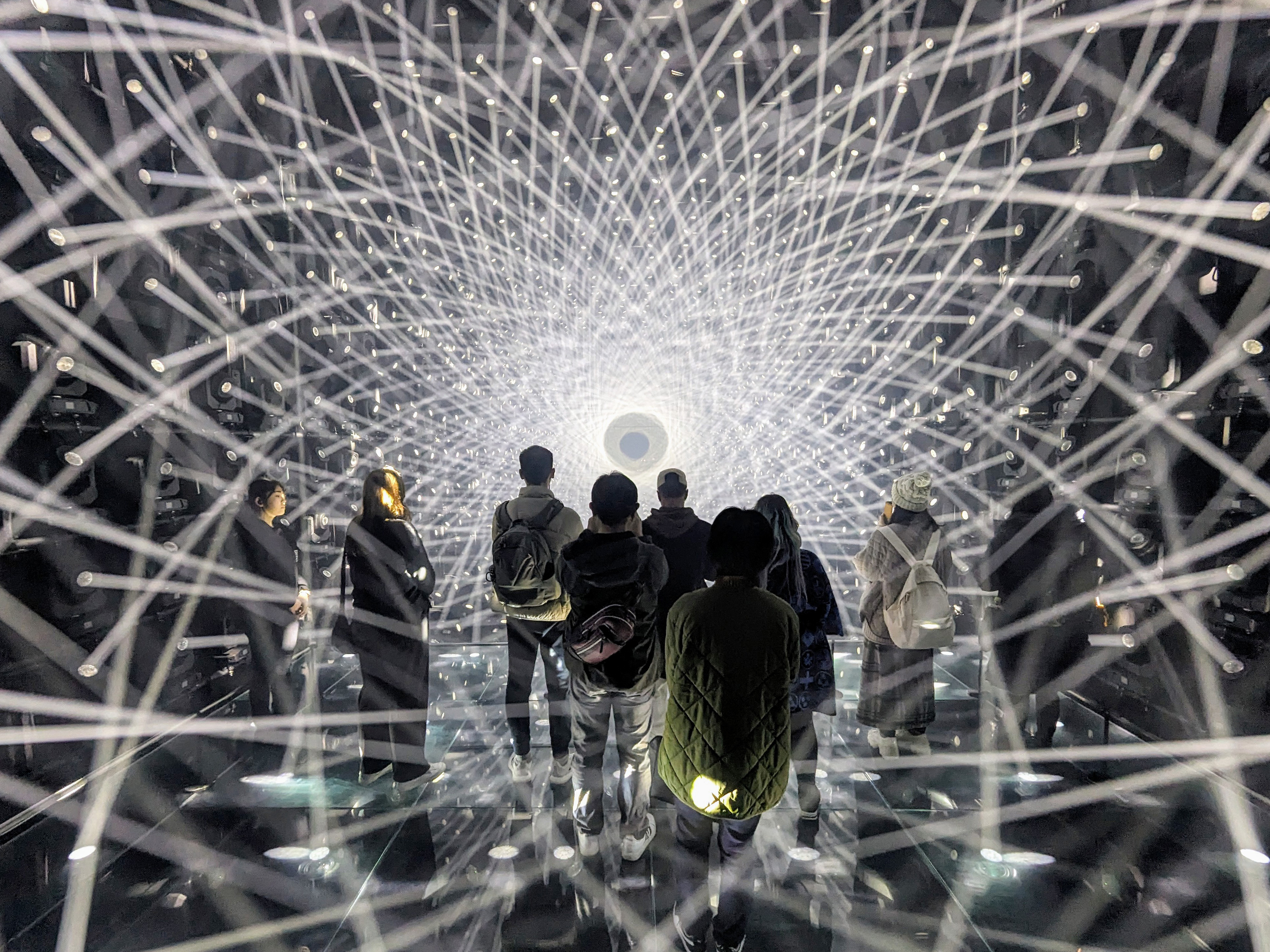
Visitors are immersed in the Light Sculpture at teamLab Borderless, Azabudai Hills, Minato City, Tokyo, Japan (2024).

== History ==
TeamLab was founded in 1998 by Toshiyuki Inoko and Shunsuke Aoki while they were studying at the Faculty of Engineering, University of Tokyo. They did so in collaboration with three other friends with engineering backgrounds: Sakai Daisuke, Tamura Tetsuya, and Yoshimura Joe. The interdisciplinary group was officially incorporated when Inoko graduated from the university in March 2001.

TeamLab initially made little profit, but began to grow its reach through the creation of websites and smartphone applications, as well as office and store designs for outside corporations. In 2011, artist Takashi Murakami invited the collective to make its debut at the Singapore Biennale. When they received some success he invited them a second time to his gallery Kaikai Kiki in Taipei later that year, which ended up being their first big break in the artworld. The exhibit was titled "We are The Future" and was featured around artists who focused on art-technology integrations.

In 2014, the New York PACE Gallery began to help promote TeamLab’s work. TeamLab organized its own exhibition in Tokyo in 2015. Since then a variety of other museums have gotten involved with TeamLab in both positive and negative ways. In 2020, TeamLab has sued MODS (Museum of Dream Space) for allegedly imitating its artwork and violating its copyrights. They have been fighting a legal battle for two years.

== Exhibitions & Installations ==
=== General Installations ===
TeamLab has sold multiple permanent collections to Museums, Galleries, Airports, and even some public parks. Some of these locations include:

- The Museum of Contemporary Art, Los Angeles
- Art Gallery of New South Wales, Sydney
- Art Gallery of South Australia, Adelaide
- Asia Society Museum, New York
- Borusan Contemporary Art Collection, Istanbul
- National Gallery of Victoria, Melbourne
- Amos Rex, Helsinki.

Singapore has the highest quantity of TeamLab exhibitions outside of Japan, where they are based. Some exhibit locations specific to Singapore include the National Museum of Singapore, Jewel Changi Airport, Marina Bay Sands, Gardens by the Bay and CapitaSpring.

=== Kadokawa Culture Museum ===
In late 2020, TeamLab premiered "Resonating Life in the Acorn Forest" a permanent art installation at the Kadokawa Culture Museum at Tokorozawa Sakura Town in Tokorozawa, Japan. Situated in the Musashino forest it consists of color-changing ovoid shapes in the woods which respond to touch and wind. During the day the silver ovoid shapes reflect their forest surroundings. At night the shapes and trees near the installation are individually flooded with colored light.

=== Continuity ===
Hosted in 2021-2022 at the Asian Art Museum of San Francisco Continuity features an interactive space in which the audience can interact with visuals projected onto the walls and floor. It's possible for the audience to kill a butterfly, grow a field of flowers, or startle a fish sending it darting off to another area of the room.

=== Borderless ===
TeamLab Borderless is jointly operated by Mori Building Co., Ltd and TeamLab. It opened on 21 June 2018 in Tokyo, Japan. It was meant to highlight the isolation of the COVID-19 era and the interweaving of technology and everyday life. The location is considered meaningful as, according to MAST, The Journal of Media Art Study and Theory, Odaiba's deep history and recent usage as a market area has turned it into a space that “interweaves its lived history of protecting Japan’s borders with the futuristic technologies, businesses, and leisure destinations of an expansive globalized world.” It includes audience interactive screens with minimal physical forms. The artworks are also able to interact with each other, for example, birds from one room are able to fly into other rooms, in which case they'll transform to match the current exhibit rooms style.

=== MORI Building Digital Art Museum ===
TeamLab’s exhibition Massless was the opening project of the Amos Rex Museum in Helsinki, Finland in 2018.

The second digital museum was opened in Shanghai on November 5, 2019.

In September 2020, the exhibition began at Dongdaemun Design Plaza(DDP) in Seoul, South Korea. The exhibition was extended in Seoul until August 2021.

=== teamLab Planets TOKYO DMM.com ===
teamLab Planets TOKYO DMM.com in Shin-Toyosu, Tokyo, was opened to the public on the 7th July, 2018 and has an exhibition period until the end of 2027. It comprises four large-scale artwork spaces and two gardens. People go barefoot, both as a means to allow the viewer to 'immerse their entire bodies in the vast artworks' and because there are artworks in which the viewer enters the water.

teamLab Planets has received visits from a wide range of celebrities, such as: Kanye West; Steve Aoki; Blackpink; BTS; Lewis Hamilton; David Beckham; Leonardo DiCaprio; Elon Musk; and MrBeast.

== Technological Art: TeamLab's Impact ==
The idea of interactive art has existed as far back as the 1960s, relatively old when discussing modern art. It has recently been rediscovered and explored by technologically based artists, sometimes labeled as the Ultratechnologist Group. Some immediate related examples in terms of interactive installations as well as techno-art integration work includes Omega Mart, Other World, Transmediale, and FILE, all of which strive to bring the audience into the art and challenge the traditional gallery space.

TeamLab exhibitions specifically use EPSON digital technology. EPSON works through a series of touch reactive areas, projected images, and pre-coded/animated reactions. In this way, the gallery space's behavior is dependent on the viewers inside it to function and create cohesive interactive moments.

The popular interpretation of TeamLabs work is that it is intended to show the relationship between nature and artificial creations, immersing the recipient’s body in an interactive world.
