= Shibaura Institute of Technology =

Private university in Japan

Coordinates: 35°39′37″N 139°47′40″E

- 芝浦工業大学
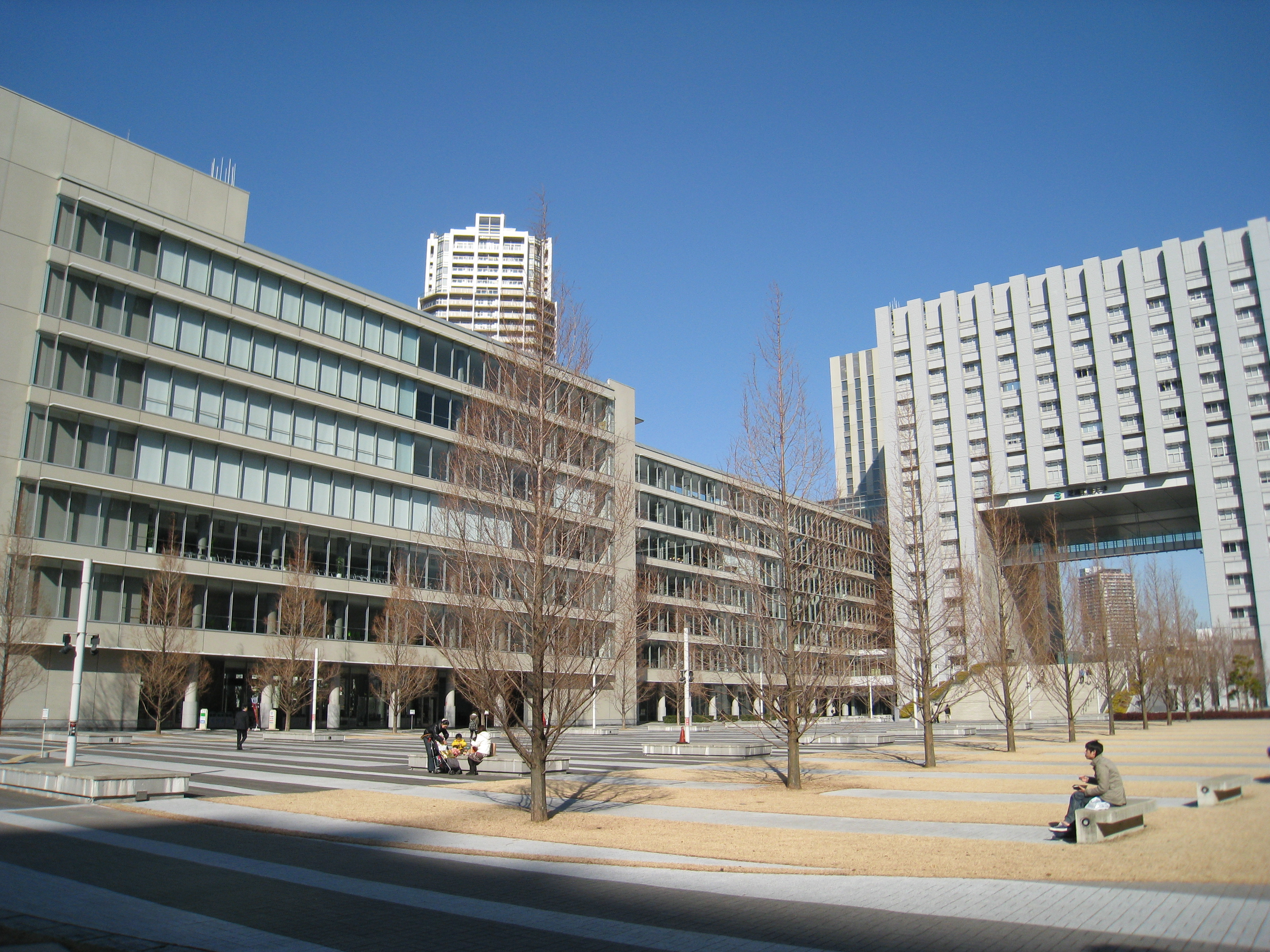
- Motto: Learning through practice
- Type: Private
- Established: 1927
- Founders: Shiro Arimoto
- Accreditation: JUAA
- President: Masato Murakami
- Students: 8,387 (2015)
- Undergraduates: 7,413 (2015)
- Postgraduates: 920 (2015)
- Doctoral students: 54 (2015)
- Location: Kōtō, Minato and Saitama, Tokyo and Saitama, Japan
- Campus: Urban
- Athletics: 33 Varsity teams
- Colors: Green
- Website: Official website

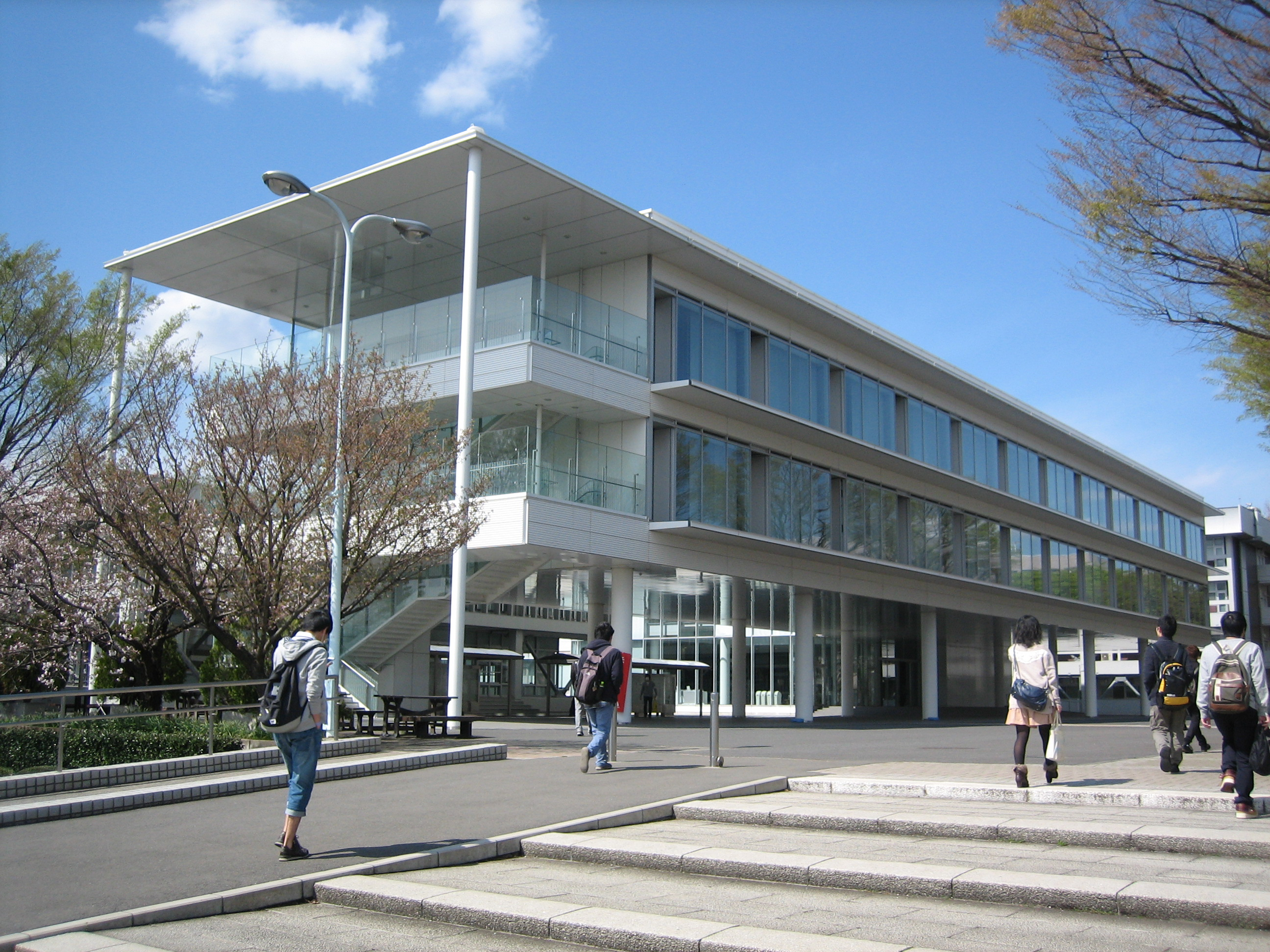
Omiya Campus

The Shibaura Institute of Technology (芝浦工業大学, Shibaura Kōgyō Daigaku), abbreviated as Shibaura kōdai (芝浦工大, Shibaura kōdai), is a private university with the main campus located in Koto, Tokyo, Japan, with campuses located in Tokyo and Saitama.

== History ==
Established in 1927 as the Tokyo Higher School of Industry and Commerce, it was chartered as a university in 1949.

== Reputation ==
The Shibaura Institute of Technology enjoys a moderately high reputation nationally, ranking 26th in the 2017 edition of Truly Strong Universities, 28th in Times Higher Education Japan University rankings for 2022 (out of 775 institutions), and joint 6th among private universities in terms of entry difficulty (in STEM). While the average acceptance rate is in the region of 20-30%, the applicants per place ratio approaches or exceeds 20:1 in some departments. Shibaura is the only private technology university in Japan to have been selected for the Top Global University Project.

== Organization ==
=== Campuses ===
Shibaura Institute of Technology's main campus is located in the Toyosu district of Kōtō, Tokyo. The nearest station is Toyosu Station.

Apart from the main campus in Toyosu, there are 2 other campuses: the Omiya Campus in Saitama, Saitama, and the Shibaura Campus in Minato, Tokyo. All undergraduates spend the first 2 years at the Omiya Campus, then move to a different campus depending on their major. Students of the College of Systems Engineering and Science will spend all 4 years at the Omiya Campus.

=== Undergraduate schools ===
- College of Engineering
  - Mechanical Engineering Program
    - Fundamental Mechanical Engineering Course
    - Advanced Mechanical Engineering Course
  - Chemistry and Materials Program
    - Environment and Materials Engineering Course
    - Chemistry and Biotechnology Course
  - Electrical and Electronic Engineering Program
    - Electrical Engineering and Robotics Course
    - Advanced Electronic Engineering Course
  - Computer and Communications Engineering Program
    - Information and Communications Engineering Course
    - Computer Science and Engineering Course
  - Civil Engineering Program
    - Urban Infrastructure and Environment Course
  - Innovative Global Program
- College of Systems Engineering and Science
  - Department of Electronic Information Systems
  - Department of Machinery and Control Systems
  - Department of Architecture and Environment Systems
  - Department of Bioscience and Engineering
  - Department of Mathematical Sciences
- College of Engineering and Design
  - Department of Engineering and Design

=== Graduate schools ===
- Graduate School of Engineering and Science (Master's Program)
  - Electrical Engineering and Computer Science
  - Materials Science and Engineering
  - Applied Chemistry
  - Mechanical Engineering
  - Architecture
  - Systems Engineering and Science
- Graduate School of Engineering and Science (Doctor's Program)
  - Regional Environment Systems
  - Functional Control Systems
- Graduate School of Engineering Management (Master's Program)
  - Engineering Management

== Notable people ==
=== Staff ===
- Leo Esaki, physicist, Nobel Prize winner
- Masataka Ogawa, chemist, known for his discovery of rhenium
- Shigemaru Takenokoshi, footballer, Japan national team manager, football coach
- Masato Murakami, materials scientist

=== Alumni ===
- Hajime Narukawa, architect, inventor of AuthaGraph and professor at Keio University
- Hidetaka Tenjin, anime artist and science fiction illustrator
- Hanako Oku, singer and songwriter
- Masashi Tashiro, television performer and musician
- Atsushi Tamaru, voice actor
- Haruki Ihara, baseball player and coach
- Katsuhiko Chikamori, Olympic handball player
- Ko Nakamura, novelist, winner of the Bungei Prize
- Tomohiko Yamazaki, announcer on the NHK
- Hisashi Sakamaki, President and CEO of Canon Electronics Inc.
- Hiroyuki Nagura, President and CEO of Nippon Filcon
- Nurul Ashikin Mabahwi, President and founder of Malaysian Community in Japan-KMJ (在日マレーシアコミュニティ), politician

== Partner institutions ==
The Shibaura Institute of Technology has partner agreements with over 150 universities in about 40 countries across all six continents. These include The University of Queensland; Pennsylvania State University; University of California, Irvine; Aalto University; Loughborough University; Korea University; University of São Paulo; and The NorthCap University.
