= Inagi =

Inagi 稲城市
- City
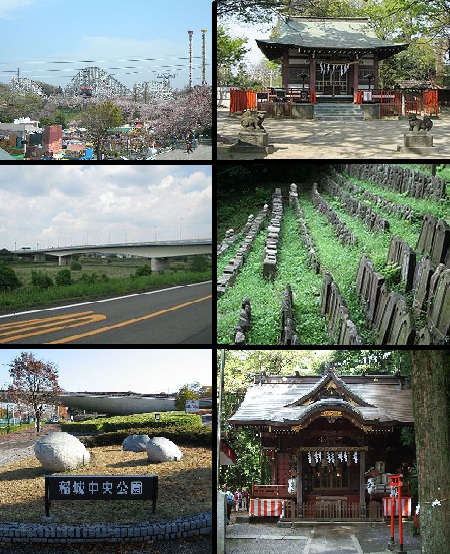
- Clockwise from top left: Yomiuri Land Amusement Park, Aoi Shrine, Stone Buddha Statue in Mount Arigata, Anazawa-ten Shrine, Inagi Central Park, Inagi Bridge

- Flag Seal

- Location of Inagi in Tokyo

- Coordinates: 35°38′17″N 139°30′16″E
- Country: Japan
- Region: Kantō
- Prefecture: Tokyo

Government
  - Mayor: Katsuhiro Takahashi

Area
  - Total: 17.97 km^{2} (6.94 sq mi)

Population (July 1, 2026)
  - Total: 95,150
  - Density: 5,295/km^{2} (13,710/sq mi)
- Time zone: UTC+9 (Japan Standard Time)
- Symbols
  - Tree: Ginkgo biloba
  - Flower: Pyrus pyrifolia
- Phone number: 042-378-2111
- Address: 2111 Higashi-Naganuma, Inagi-shi, Tokyo 206-8601
- Website: Official website

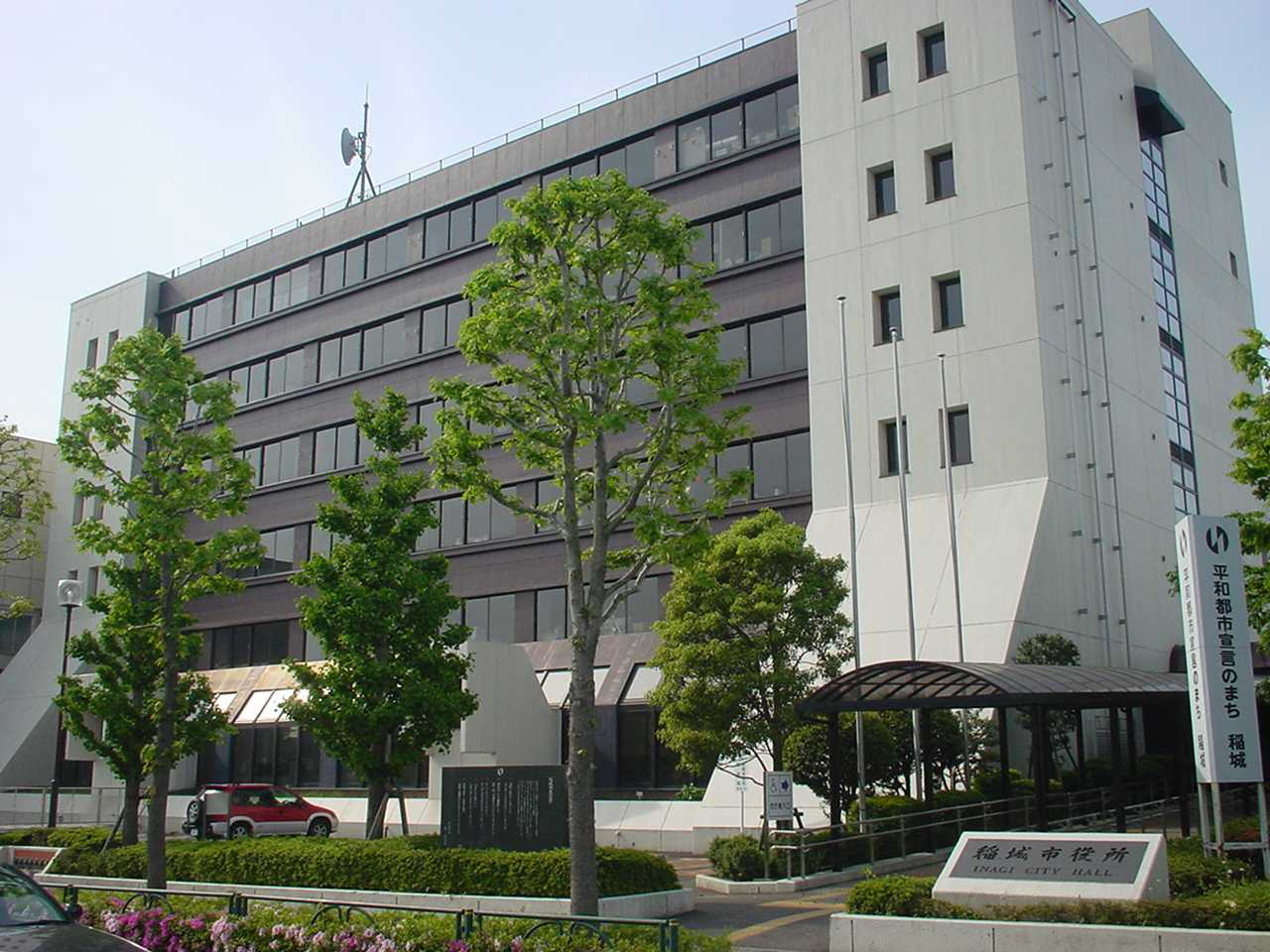
Inagi City Hall

Inagi (稲城市, Inagi-shi; Japanese pronunciation: [í.nä̀.ɡ̟ʲì, -ŋ̟ʲì, ì.nä́.ɡ̟ʲí.ɕì, -ŋ̟ʲí.ɕì]) is a city located in the western portion of the Tokyo Metropolis, Japan. The city covers an area of 17.97 square kilometres (6.94 sq mi) and is located at 35°38′17″N, 139°30′16″E. As of July 1, 2026, it had an estimated population of 94,409 in 44,606 households, with a population density of 5,254 persons per km^{2}.

== Geography ==
Inagi is located in the south-central portion of Tokyo Metropolis, approximately 25 kilometres west of central Tokyo. The city lies between the Tama River to the north and the Tama Hills to the south, along its boundary with Kanagawa Prefecture. Its elevation ranges from approximately 20 to 162 metres above sea level.

=== Surrounding municipalities ===
Tokyo Metropolis

- Chōfu
- Fuchū
- Tama

Kanagawa Prefecture

- Kawasaki

=== Climate ===
Inagi has a humid subtropical climate (Köppen Cfa) characterized by warm summers and cool winters with light to no snowfall. The average annual temperature in Inagi is 15.4 °C. The average annual rainfall is 1,598.9 mm, with September as the wettest month. The temperatures are highest on average in August, at around 26.8 °C, and lowest in January, at around 4.5 °C.

== Demographics ==
According to Japanese census data, the population of Inagi has increased steadily since the 1950s.

Historical population
Year	Pop.	±%
1950	9,824	—
1960	11,012	+12.1%
1970	30,817	+179.8%
1980	48,154	+56.3%
1990	58,635	+21.8%
2000	69,235	+18.1%
2010	84,835	+22.5%
2020	93,151	+9.8%

== History ==
The area of Inagi has been settled since the Japanese Paleolithic, or for over 20,000 years, based on projectile points, stone tools and microliths found in several locations within city borders. There is evidence of several Jomon period settlements, but settlement disappeared towards the end of the Jomon period due to climate change and eruptions of Mount Fuji. The area was sparsely settled in the Yayoi period, with increasing settlement density in the Kofun period. A number of Nara period remains have been found, including the ruins of a roof tile kiln. During the Heian period, the area became part of a shōen controlled by the Oyamada clan, and later by their cadet branch, the Inabe clan into the Kamakura period, and was an area contested between competing branches of the Ashikaga clan and Uesugi clan in the Muromachi and Sengoku periods. After the start of the Edo period, the area was tenryō controlled directly by the Tokugawa shogunate.

Inagi Village was established on April 1, 1889, in Minamitama District, Kanagawa Prefecture, through the merger of the villages of Yanokuchi, Higashi-Naganuma, Omaru, Momura, Sakahama and Hirao under the modern municipalities system. Minamitama District was transferred from Kanagawa Prefecture to Tokyo Prefecture in 1893. Parts of Oshitate and Tokihisa were incorporated into Inagi Village in 1949.

Inagi was elevated to town status on April 1, 1957, and became a city on November 1, 1971. From the latter half of the 20th century, the development of Tama New Town contributed to its transformation from an agricultural community into a suburban residential city.

== Government ==
Inagi has a mayor-council form of government with a directly elected mayor and a unicameral city council consisting of 22 members.

For the Tokyo Metropolitan Assembly, Inagi forms an electoral district together with the city of Tama, which elects two members.

For the House of Representatives of the National Diet, Inagi is part of the Tokyo 30th district.

== Economy ==
Inagi is primarily a bedroom community for central Tokyo, with large-scale residential development associated with the Tama New Town project from the 1960s onward. Agriculture remains important in some areas, particularly the cultivation of Japanese pears and grapes.

The city is also home to manufacturing and technology companies, including paper machinery manufacturer Nippon Filcon, electronic musical instrument manufacturer Korg, and Fujitsu Frontech. Tourism and leisure also contribute to the local economy through facilities such as Yomiuriland and TOKYO GIANTS TOWN.

== Education ==
Higher education institutions in the city include Komazawa Women's University and Komazawa Women's Junior College.

The Tokyo Metropolitan Government Board of Education operates Tokyo Metropolitan Wakaba Comprehensive High School. The city also contains the private Komazawa Gakuen Girls' Junior High School and Senior High School.

Inagi has twelve public elementary schools and six public junior high schools operated by the Inagi City Board of Education.

== Transportation ==
=== Railway ===
JR East – Nambu Line

- Yanokuchi - Inagi-Naganuma - Minami-Tama

Keio Corporation - Keio Sagamihara Line

- Keiō-Yomiuri-Land - Inagi

=== Highway ===
- Chūō Expressway – Inagi Interchange

=== Major roads ===
- Tokyo Metropolitan Route 9
- Tsurukawa Kaidō
- Minami-Tama Ridge Trunk Road

== Sister and friendship cities ==
Inagi maintains sister city relationships with:

- Ozora, Hokkaido, Japan (since 1991)
- Foster City, California, United States (since 2021)

It also maintains friendship city relationships with:

- Sōma, Fukushima, Japan (since 2015)
- Nozawaonsen, Nagano, Japan (since 2015)

== Local attractions ==
- Yomiuriland, an amusement park.
- Giants Town Stadium, the home stadium of the Yomiuri Giants' farm team.

== Sports ==
- Tokyo Verdy, a professional men's football club whose training ground is located in Inagi.
- Nippon TV Tokyo Verdy Beleza, a professional women's football club based in Inagi.

== Notable people from Inagi ==
- Kunio Okawara, anime mechanical designer
