= Inadazutsumi Station =

Railway station in Kawasaki, Kanagawa Prefecture, Japan

JN16 Inadazutsumi Station 稲田堤駅
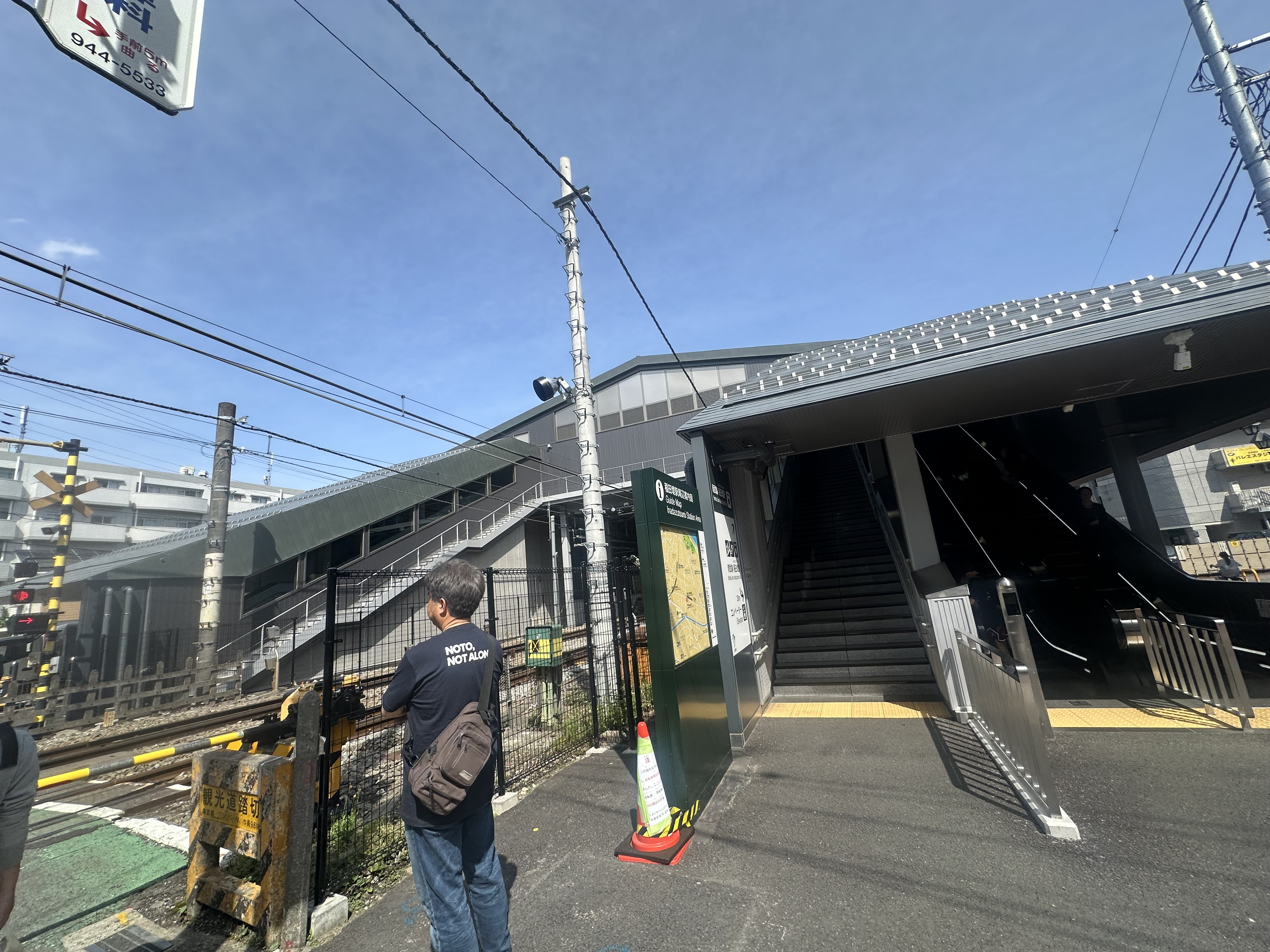
- Inadazutsumi Station entrance in May 2025

General information
- Location: 1 Inadazutsumi, Tama-ku, Kawasaki-shi, Kanagawa-ken 214-0003; Japan
- Coordinates: 35.6336°N 139.5361°E
- Operator: JR East
- Line: Nambu Line
- Distance: 20.8 km from Kawasaki
- Platforms: 2 side platforms
- Tracks: 2

Other information
- Station code: JN16
- Website: Official website

History
- Opened: 1 November 1927

Passengers
- FY2019: 26,453 daily

Services
Preceding station	JR East	Following station
Inagi-Naganuma JN18 towards Tachikawa	Nambu Line Rapid	Noborito JN14 towards Kawasaki
Yanokuchi JN17 towards Tachikawa	Nambu Line Local	Nakanoshima JN15 towards Kawasaki
Location
- Location within Kanagawa Prefecture Location within Japan

Inadazutsumi Station (稲田堤駅, Inadazutsumi-eki) is a passenger railway station located in Tama-ku, Kawasaki, Kanagawa Prefecture, Japan, operated by the East Japan Railway Company (JR East).

== Lines ==
Inadazutsumi Station is served by the Nambu Line. The station is 20.8 km (12.9 mi) from the southern terminus of the line at Kawasaki Station.

== Station layout ==
The station consists of two opposed side platforms serving two tracks, connected by a footbridge. The station is staffed.

=== Platforms ===
1	Nambu Line	for Noborito, Musashi-Mizonokuchi, Musashi-Kosugi, and Kawasaki
2	Nambu Line	for Fuchū-Hommachi, Bubaigawara, and Tachikawa

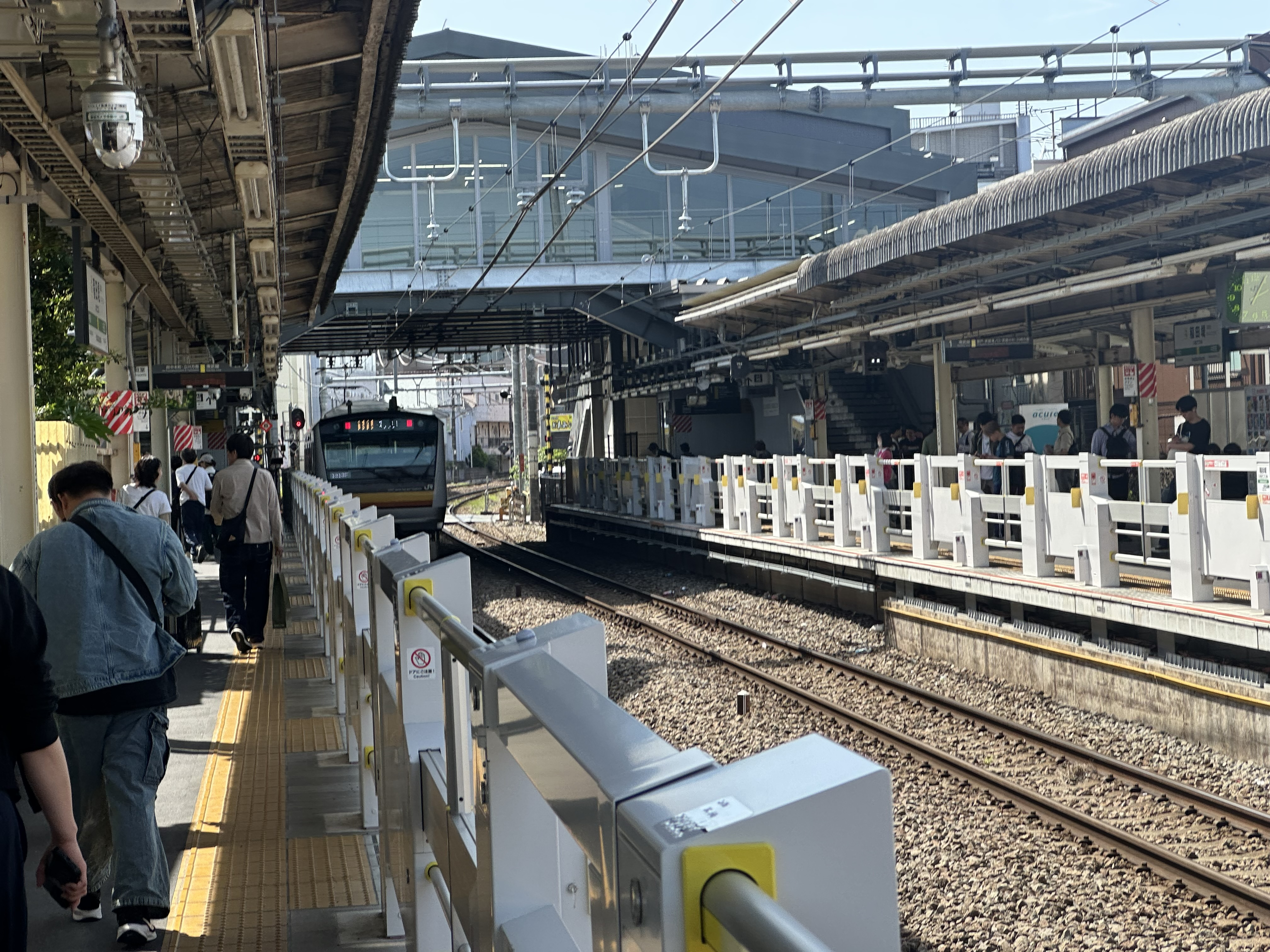
The station platforms in May 2025

== History ==
Inadazutsumi Station opened on 1 November 1927 as a station on the Nambu Railway. The Nambu Railway was nationalized on 1 April 1944, and the station came under the control of Japanese National Railways (JNR). With the privatization of JNR on 1 April 1987, the station was absorbed into the JR East network.

== Passenger statistics ==
In fiscal 2019, the station was used by an average of 26,453 passengers daily (boarding passengers only).

The passenger figures (boarding passengers only) for previous years are as shown below.

Fiscal year	daily average
2005	19,528
2010	22,855
2015	25,643

== Surrounding area ==
- Keio-inadazutsumi Station (Keio Sagamihara Line)
- Inada Park

== See also ==
- List of railway stations in Japan
