= Nakanoshima Station (Kanagawa) =

Railway station in Kawasaki, Kanagawa Prefecture, Japan

JN15 Nakanoshima Station 中野島駅
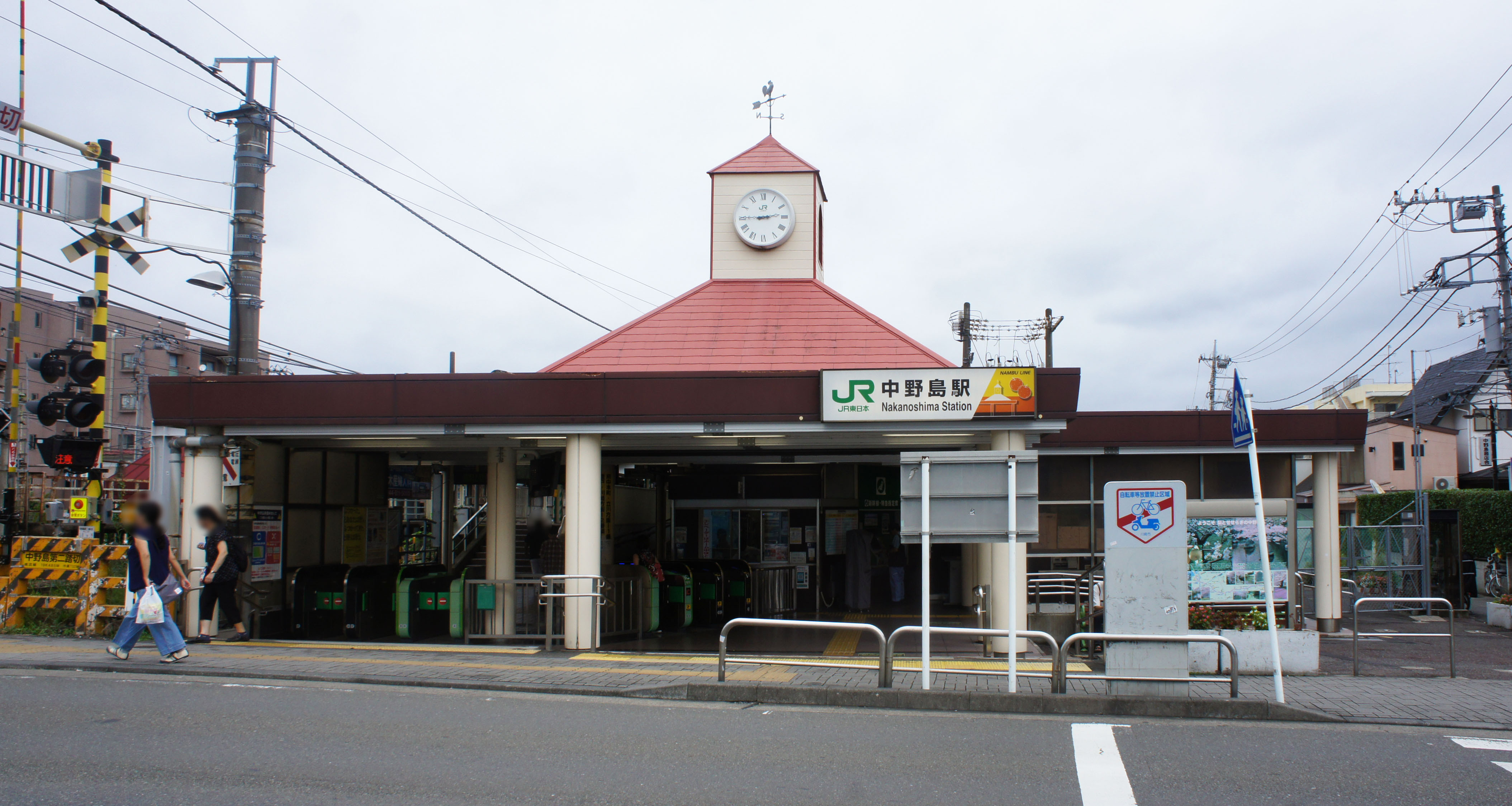
- Nakanoshima Station, September 2019

General information
- Location: Nakanoshima 3-13-1, Tama-ku, Kawasaki-shi, Kanagawa-ken 214-0012; Japan
- Coordinates: 35.6301°N 139.5511°E
- Operator: JR East
- Line: Nambu Line
- Distance: 19.5 km from Kawasaki
- Platforms: 2 side platforms

Other information
- Station code: JN15
- Website: Official website

History
- Opened: 1 November 1927

Passengers
- FY2019: 14,824 daily

Services
Preceding station	JR East	Following station
Inadazutsumi JN16 towards Tachikawa	Nambu Line Local	Noborito JN14 towards Kawasaki
Location
- Location within Kanagawa Prefecture Location within Japan

Nakanoshima Station (中野島駅, Nakanoshima-eki) is a passenger railway station located in Tama-ku, Kawasaki, Kanagawa Prefecture, Japan, operated by the East Japan Railway Company (JR East).

== Lines ==
Nakanoshima Station is served by the Nambu Line. The station is 19.5 km (12.1 mi) the southern terminus of the line at Kawasaki Station.

== Station layout ==
The station consists of two opposed side platforms serving two tracks, connected by a footbridge. The station is staffed.

=== Platforms ===
1	Nambu Line	for Noborito, Musashi-Mizonokuchi, Musashi-Kosugi, and Kawasaki
2	Nambu Line	for Fuchū-Hommachi, Bubaigawara, and Tachikawa

== History ==
Nakanoshima Station was opened on 1 November 1927, as a station on the Nambu Railway. Freight operations began in 1929. The Nambu Railway was nationalized on 1 April 1944, and the station came under the control of the Japan National Railways (JNR). The station was relocated 400 m (1,300 ft) towards Noborito Station in December 1945. Freight operations were discontinued after 1955. After the privatization of the JNR on 1 April 1987, the station was absorbed into the JR East network.

== Passenger statistics ==
In fiscal 2019, the station was used by an average of 14,824 passengers daily (boarding passengers only).

The passenger figures (boarding passengers only) for previous years are as shown below.

Fiscal year	daily average
2005	13,646
2010	14,238
2015	14,507

== Surrounding area ==
- Nakanoshima Kitaguchi Dori Shopping Street
- Nakanoshima Chuo-dori Shopping Street.

== See also ==
- List of railway stations in Japan
