= Toyosu Station =

Metro and railway station in Tokyo, Japan

Coordinates: 35.654995°N 139.796079°E

Toyosu Station 豊洲駅
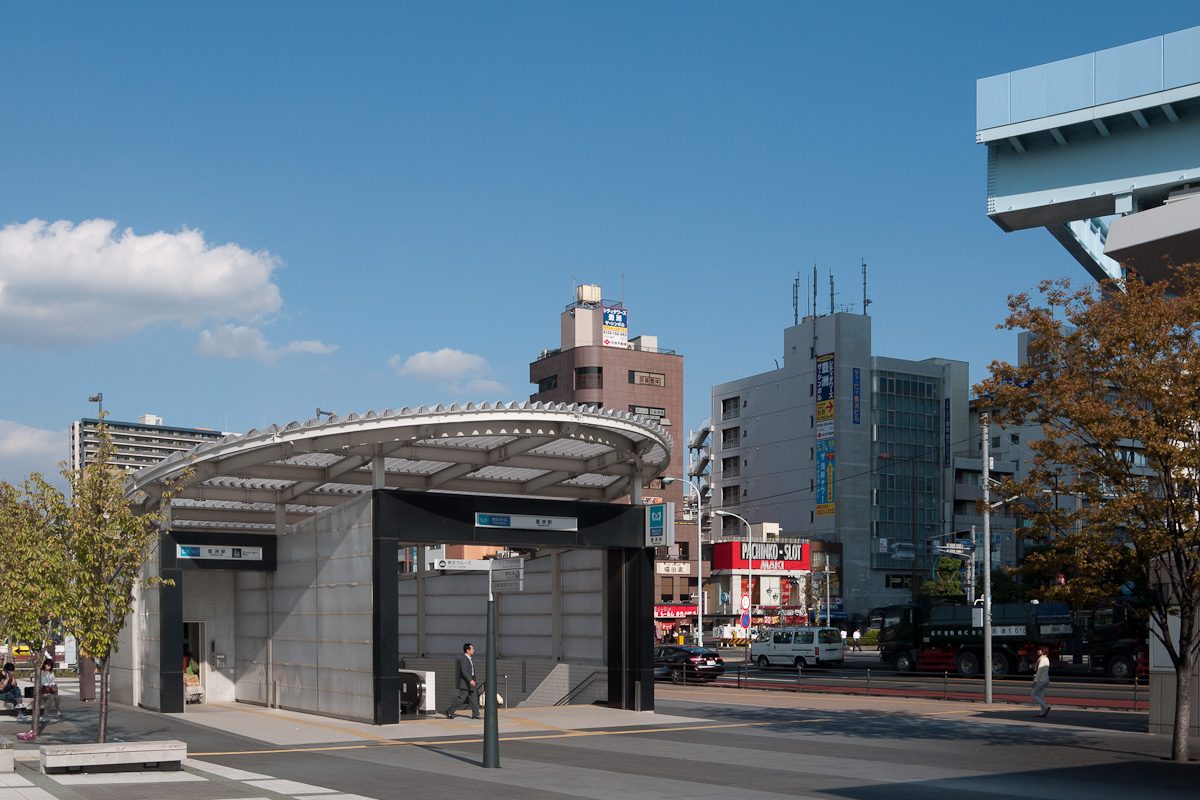
- Exit 7 of the Tokyo Metro station in September 2011, with the end of the elevated Yurikamome tracks just visible

General information
- Location: Toyosu, Kōtō City, Tokyo; Japan
- Owner: Tokyo Metro Co., Ltd. Yurikamome Inc.
- Operator: Tokyo Metro; Yurikamome
- Connections: Bus terminal

Construction
- Structure type: Elevated

History
- Opened: 8 June 1988; 38 years ago
Location
- Location within Special wards of Tokyo Location within Tokyo Bay and Bōsō Peninsula Location within Tokyo Location within Japan

Toyosu Station (豊洲駅, Toyosu-eki) is a railway station in Kōtō, Tokyo, Japan, operated by Tokyo Metro and Yurikamome.

== Lines ==
Toyosu Station is served by the Tokyo Metro Yurakucho Line subway and the Yurikamome.

== Station layout ==
The station consists of an underground metro station (numbered Y-22) on the Tokyo Metro Yurakucho Line, and an elevated station forming the eastern terminus of the Yurikamome Line (station number U-16).

=== Tokyo Metro ===
Toyosu Station 豊洲駅

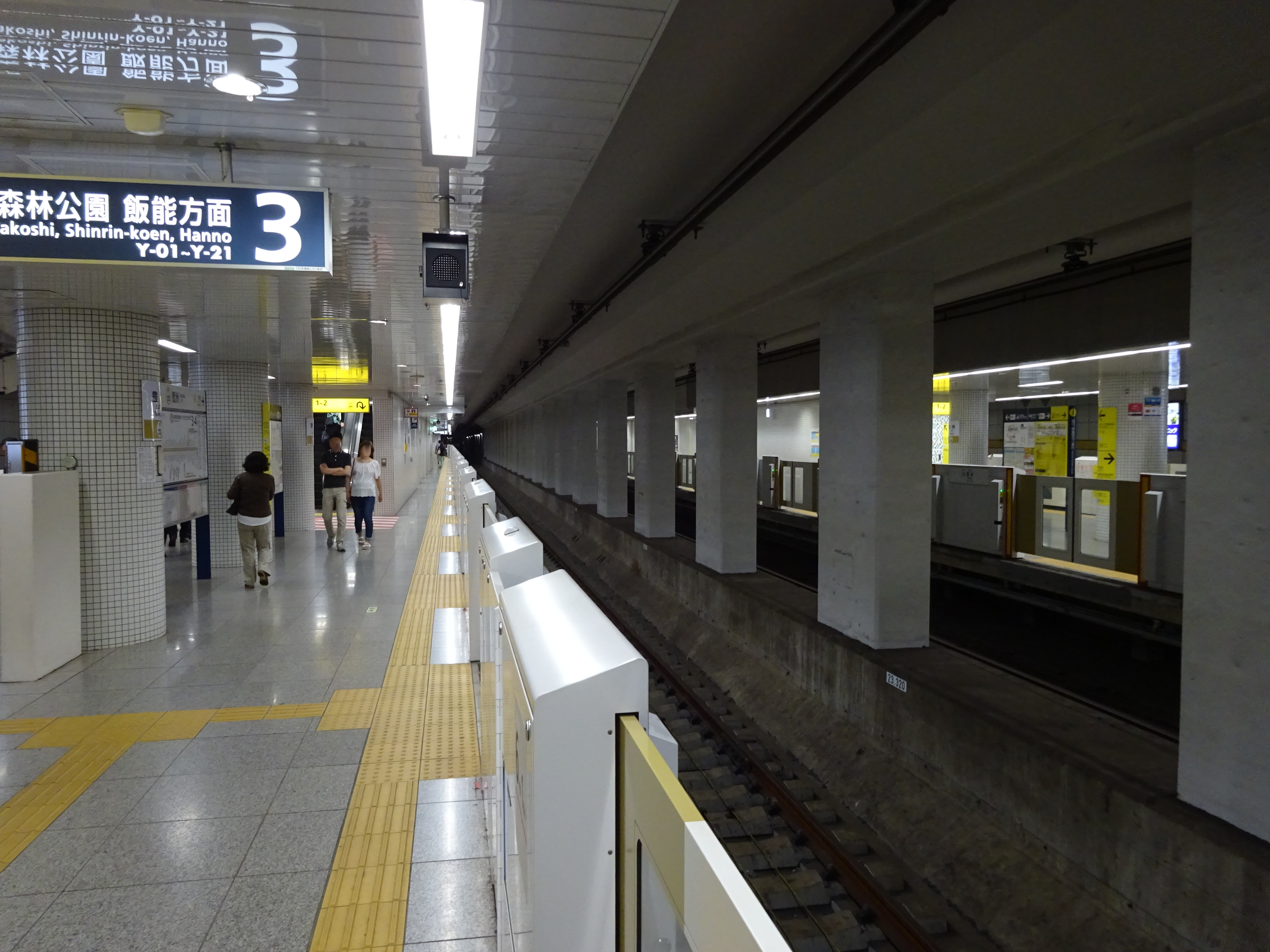
- Platform 3 in 2016

General information
- Location: 4-1-1 Toyosu, Kōtō-ku, Tokyo; Japan
- System: Tokyo subway
- Owner: Tokyo Metro Co., Ltd.
- Operator: Tokyo Metro
- Distance: 25.1 km (15.6 mi) from Wakōshi
- Platforms: 2 island platforms (Only one side of each platform in use currently)
- Tracks: 4 (Only 2 in use currently)

Construction
- Structure type: Underground

Other information
- Station code: Y-22
- Website: Official website

History
- Opened: 8 June 1988; 38 years ago

Passengers
- FY2023: 202,030 (daily)

Services
| Preceding station | Tokyo Metro | Following station |
|---|---|---|
| Yurakucho towards Kotesashi | S-Train (weekdays) | Terminus |
| Tsukishima towards Wakoshi | Yūrakuchō Line | Tatsumi towards Shin-kiba |
Location

==== Platforms ====
The subway station has two island platforms located on the third basement ("B3F") level, serving four tracks. Originally the two centre tracks were built since the opening and reserved for the future extension to Sumiyoshi, on which were completed on 1 March 2013 for use by terminating services from Wakoshi from the start of the revised timetable on 16 March 2013. Following the timetable revision on 15 October 2019 however, tracks 2 and 3 were temporarily shut down and subsequently covered up as a measure to alleviate congestion during the upcoming 2020 Tokyo Olympics, however it is not decided whether the tracks will be used again.

| 1 | Yūrakuchō Line | for Shin-kiba |
| 2/3 | Yūrakuchō Line | Tracks suspended as of spring 2020 |
| 4 | Yūrakuchō Line | for Ikebukuro and Wakōshi; Tobu Tojo Line for Shinrinkōen; Seibu Ikebukuro Line for Hannō |

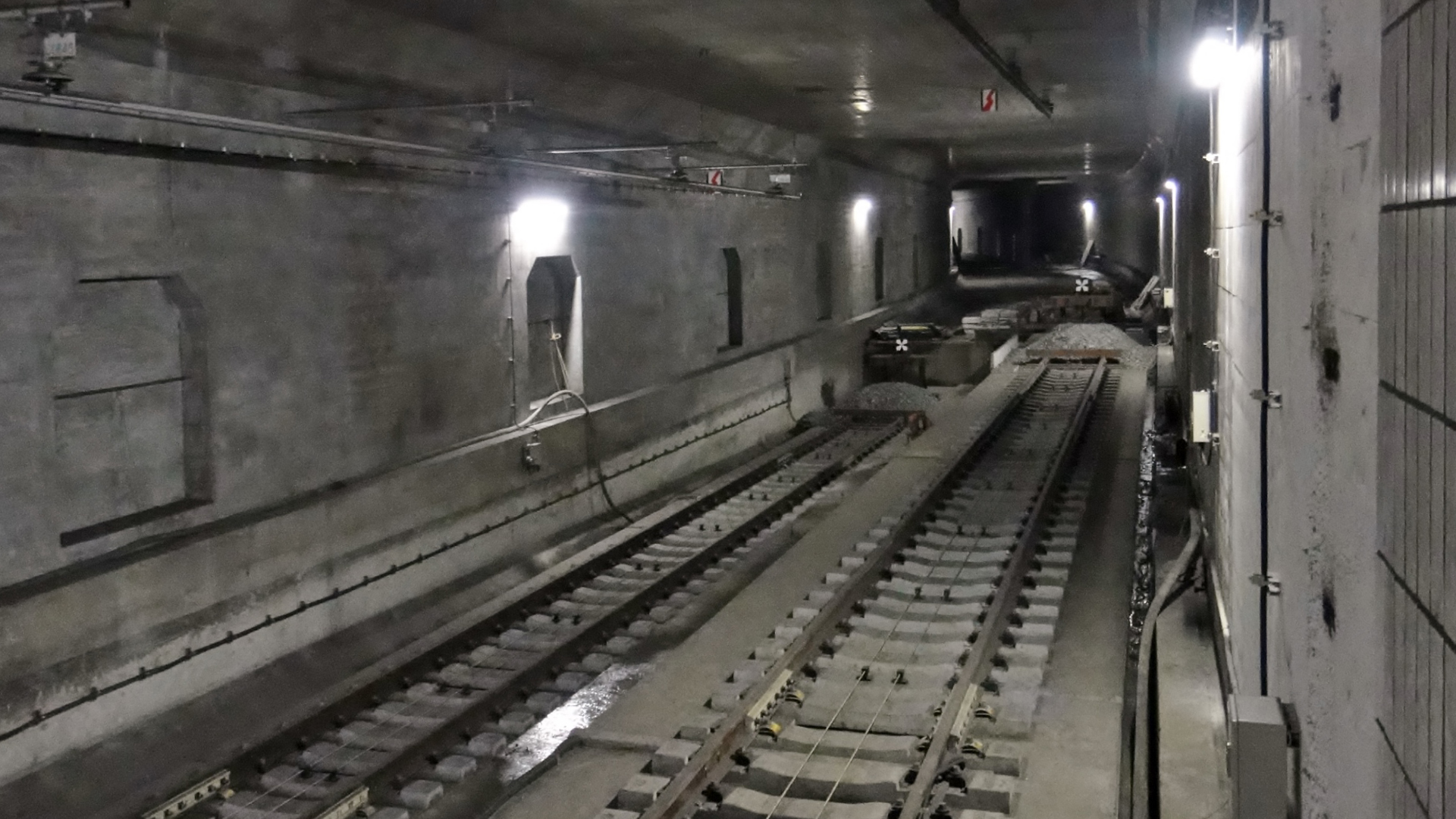
The buffer stops at the south end of tracks 2 and 3 in July 2013, showing a slight left after the buffer for future extension to Sumiyoshi

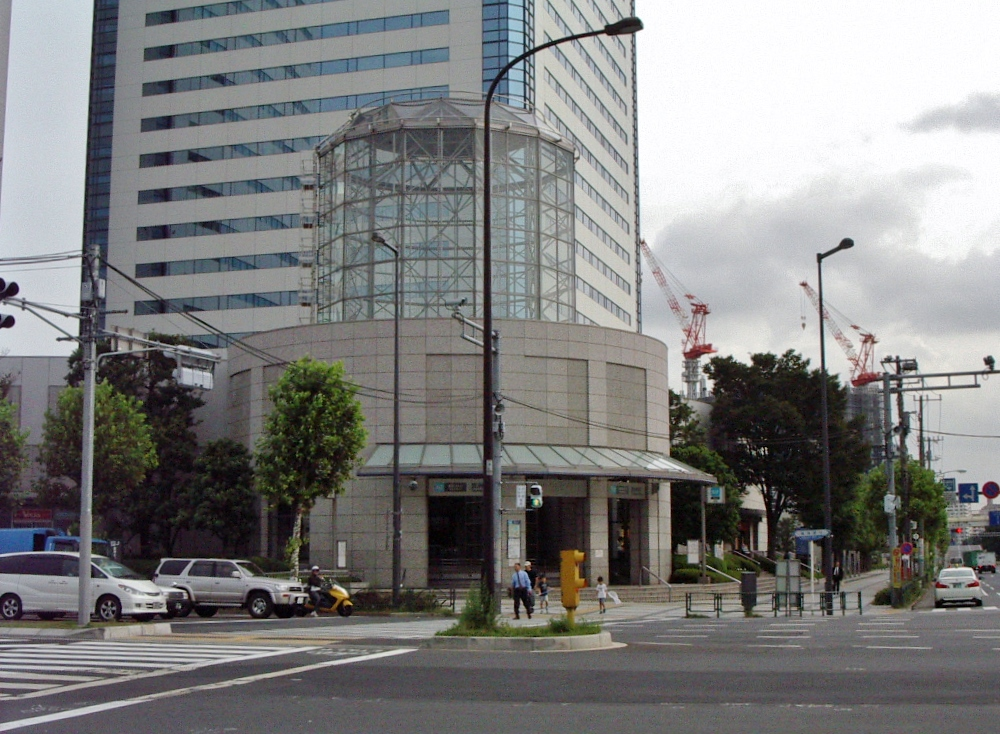
Exit 3 of the Tokyo Metro station in October 2007

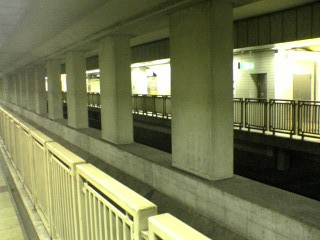
Track 2 and 3 in 2005

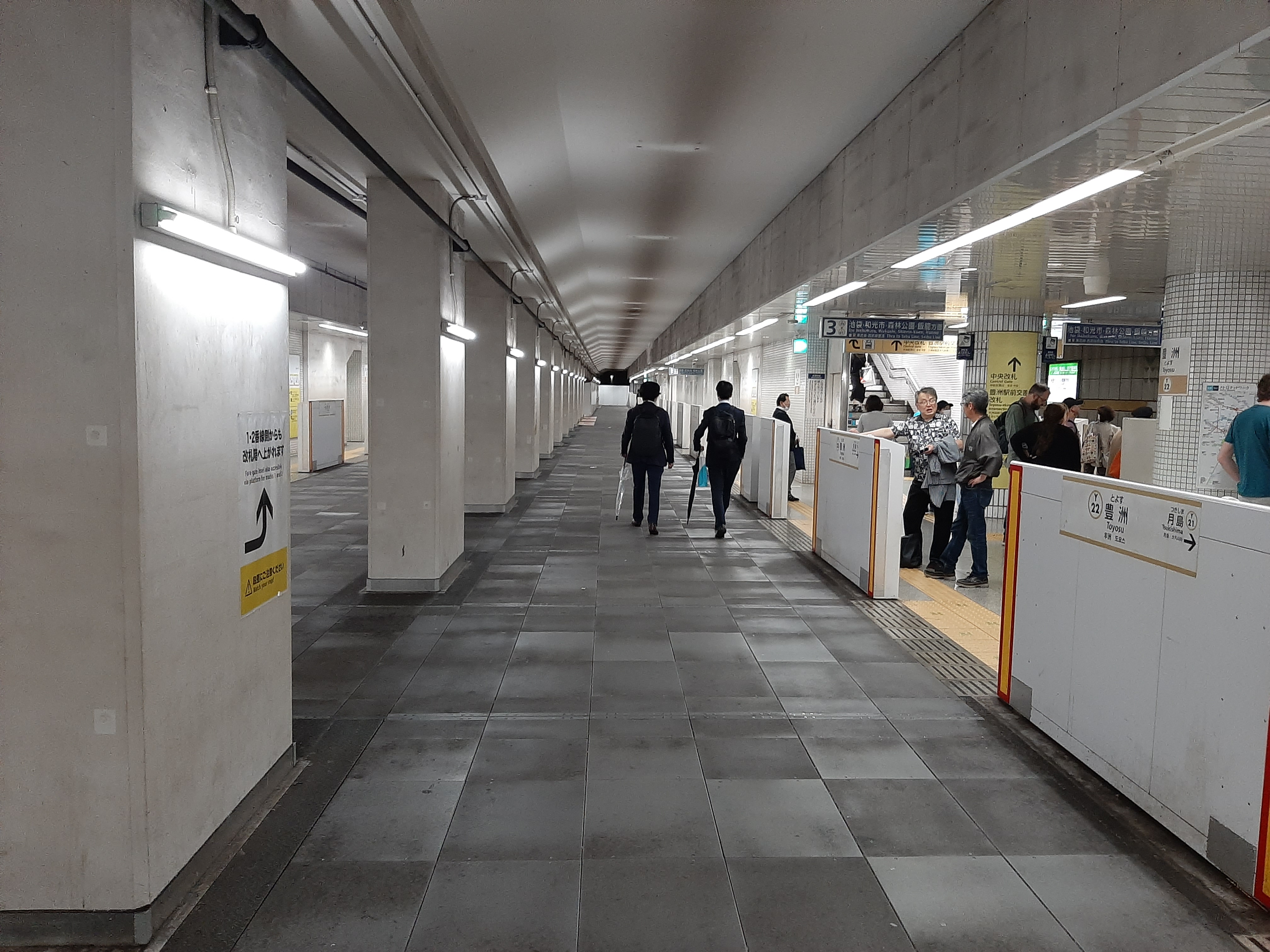
Track 2 and 3 in 2024

=== Yurikamome ===
U16 Toyosu Station 豊洲駅
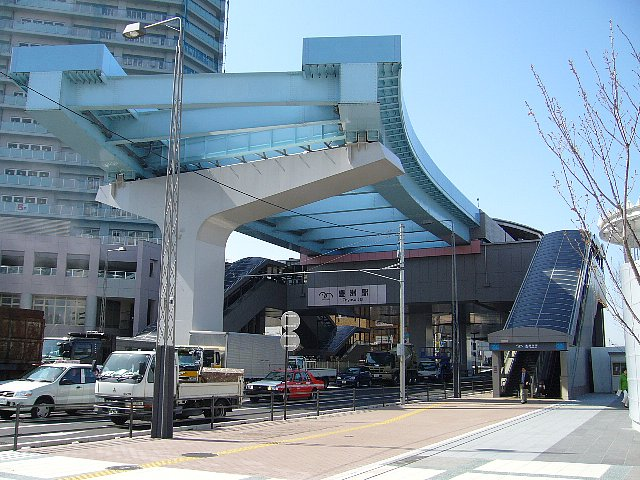
- The Yurikamome station in 2006

General information
- Location: Toyosu, Kōtō-ku, Tokyo; Japan
- System: Yurikamome station
- Operator: Yurikamome, Inc.
- Line: Yurikamome
- Distance: 14.7 km from Shimbashi
- Platforms: 1 island platform
- Tracks: 2

Construction
- Structure type: Elevated

Other information
- Station code: U-16
- Website: Official website

History
- Opened: 27 March 2006

Passengers
- FY2023: 33,957

Services
| Preceding station | Yurikamome | Following station |
|---|---|---|
| Shin-toyosu U15 towards Shimbashi | New Transit Yurikamome | Terminus |
Location

==== Platforms ====
The station consists of a single elevated island platform serving two terminating tracks.

| 1,2 | Yurikamome | for Shijō-mae, Tokyo Big Sight, Daiba and Shimbashi |

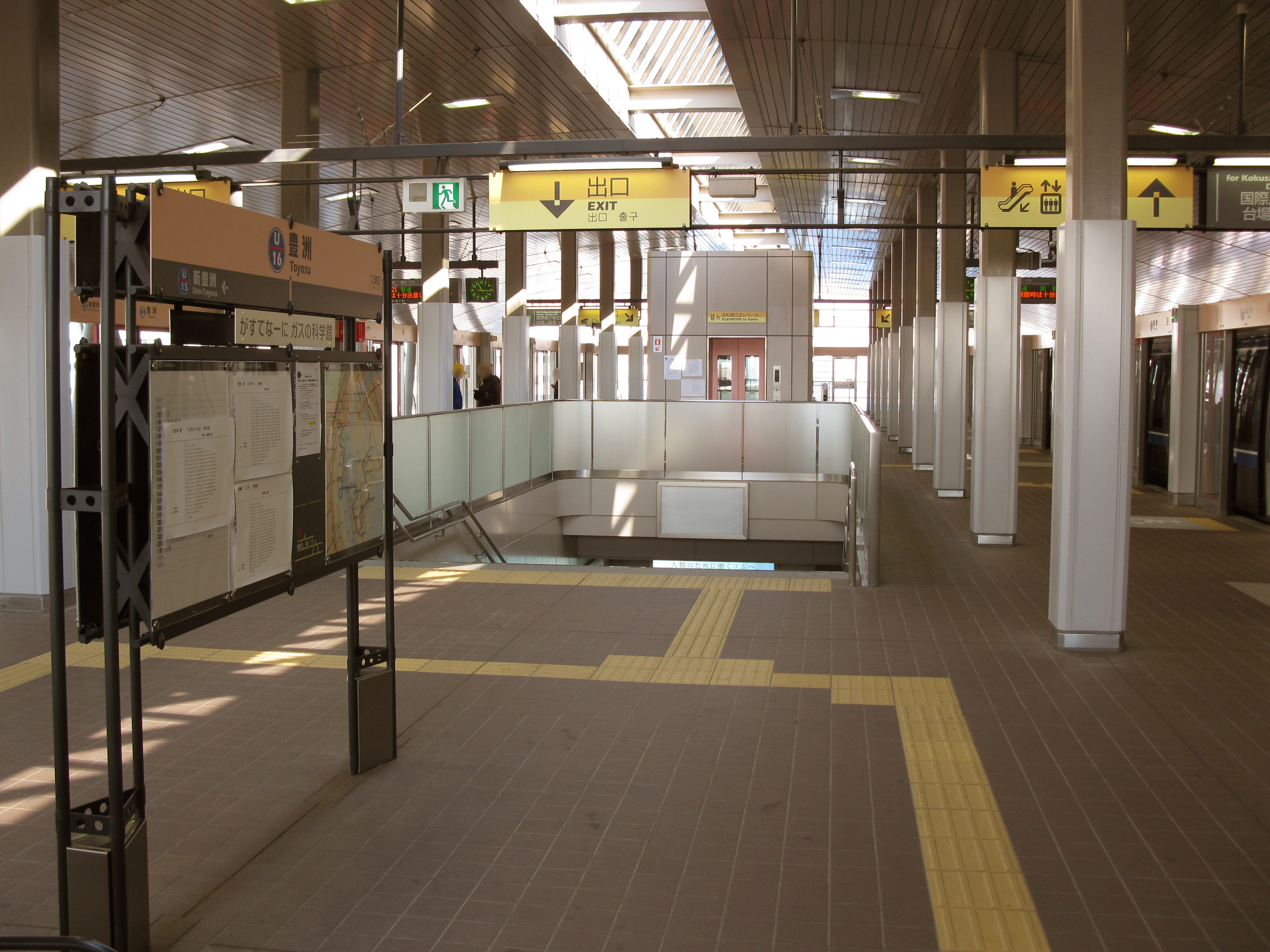
The Yurikamome platforms in December 2008

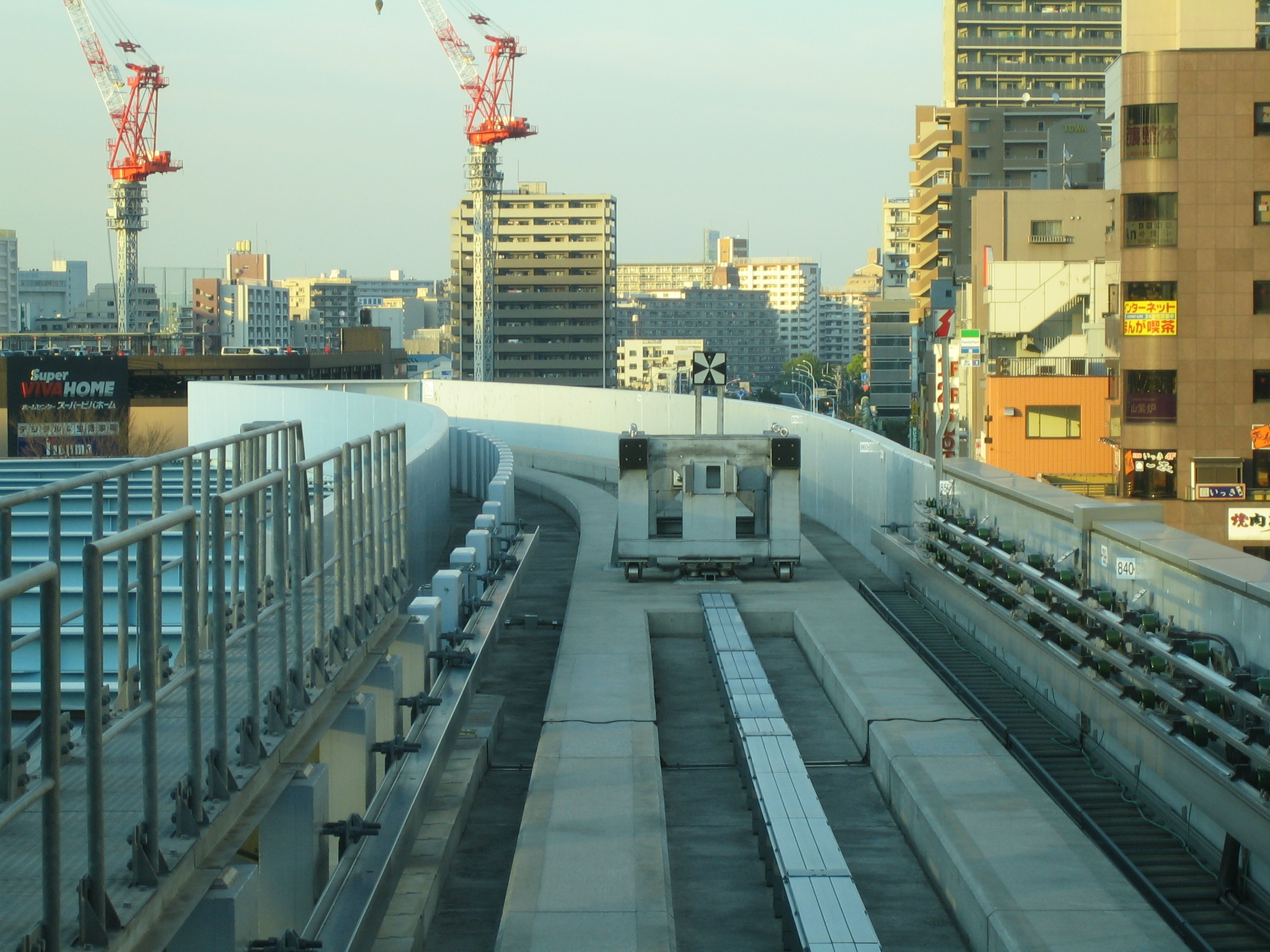
View from the end of the platforms looking northward in April 2007

== History ==
The subway station opened on 8 June 1988 when the Yurakucho Line was extended from Shintomichō to Shin-kiba by the Teito Rapid Transit Authority (TRTA). The Yurikamome station opened on 27 March 2006 when the line was extended from Ariake.

The Tokyo Metro station platforms were renumbered 1 to 4 from 1 March 2013 following completion of the two centre tracks for use by terminating trains.

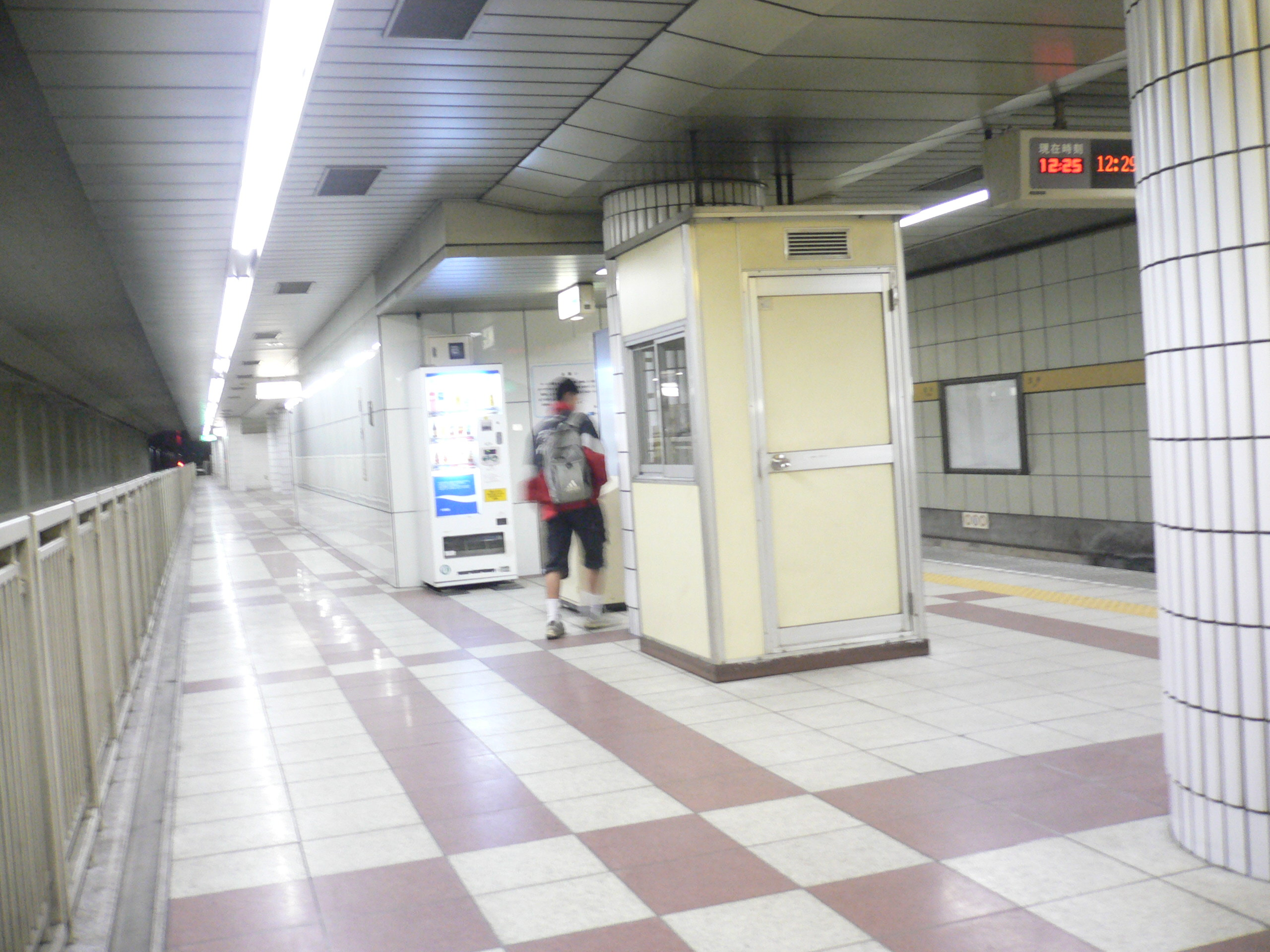
The Yurakucho Line platforms in 2005 with fences on the inner sides of the platforms

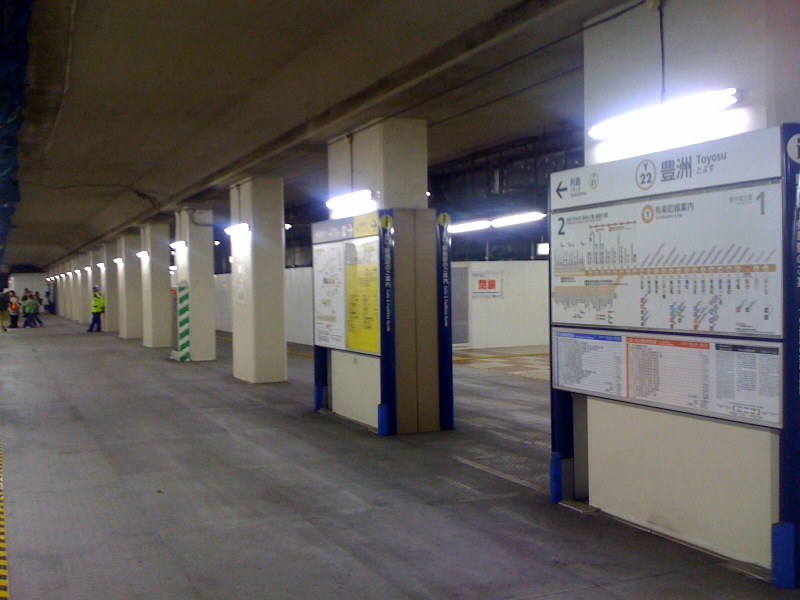
The Yurakucho Line platforms in 2010, with a temporary surface over the centre tracks

== Passenger statistics ==
During FY2023, the Tokyo Metro station was used on average by 202,030 passengers daily and the Yurikamome station was used by 33,957 passengers daily. (Note: Data published by the Ministry of Land, Infrastructure, Transport and Tourism state the number of passengers boarding and disembarking by station in a given year. FY2023 covers the period from 1 April 2023 to 31 March 2024. Data published by individual railways directly may state the number boarding only.) The passenger figures for previous years for each station are as shown below.

| | Tokyo Metro | Yurikamome |
| Fiscal year | Daily average | Daily Average |
|---|---|---|
| 2011 | 154,214 | 16,060 |
| 2012 | 160,196 | 17,877 |
| 2013 | 175,147 | 18,796 |
| 2014 | 182,294 | 20,325 |
| 2015 | 200,533 | 24,003 |
| 2016 | 208,012 | 24,003 |
| 2017 | 214,032 | 22,518 |
| 2018 | 227,384 | 28,199 |
| 2019 | 227,843 | 28,916 |
| 2020 | 140,612 | 15,723 |
| 2021 | 148,607 | 19,824 |
| 2022 | 176,881 | 27,545 |
| 2023 | 202,030 | 33,957 |

== Surrounding area ==
Toyosu has gained popularity due to the increase in high-rise apartments, such as Park City Toyosu, The Toyosu Tower, City Towers Toyosu, and the large shopping mall known as Lalaport Toyosu.

Other places of note in the vicinity include the following.

- Gas Science Museum
- Shibaura Institute of Technology
- Showa University Toyosu Hospital
- Toyosu Library
- Fukagawa No. 5 Junior High School
- Toyosu Elementary School
- Toyosu-kita Elementary School
- TeamLab Planets TOKYO DMM.com

== See also ==
- List of railway stations in Japan
