= Giants Town Stadium =

Coordinates: 35.629°N 139.512°E

Giants Town Stadium in Inagi, Tokyo, opened on March 1, 2025. It is the home of the Yomiuri Giants' farm team which plays in the Eastern League. It was designed to bring fans closer to the players. It will also host women's softball and amateur men's baseball games.
