= Inagi-Naganuma Station =

Railway station in Inagi, Tokyo, Japan

JN18 Inagi-Naganuma Station 稲城長沼駅
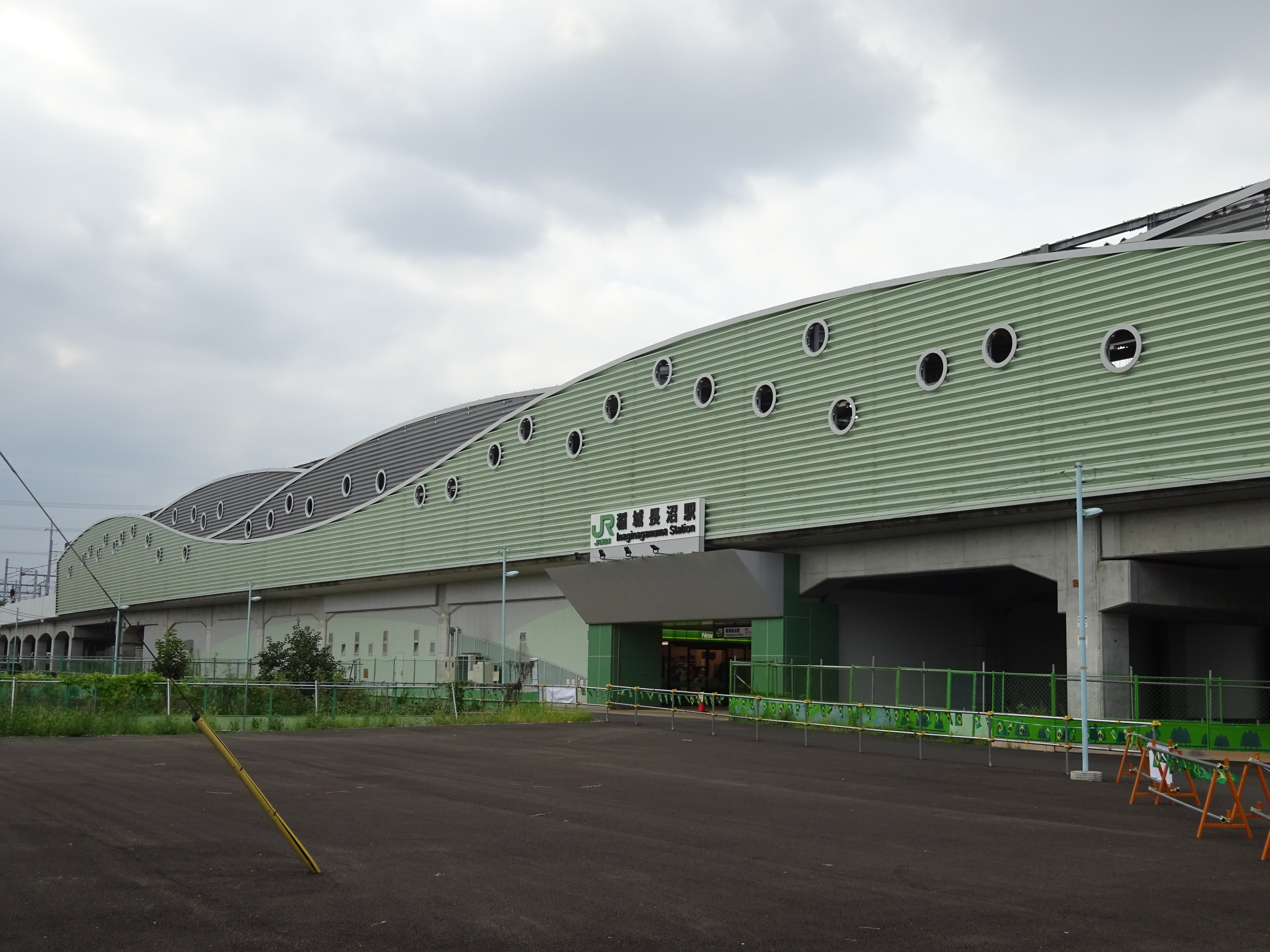
- Inagi-Naganuma Station, south exit, August 2016

General information
- Location: Higashi-Naganuma 556, Inagi-shi, Tokyo 206-0802; Japan
- Coordinates: 35°38′39.53″N 139°30′9.2″E
- Operator: JR East
- Line: Nambu Line
- Distance: 24.1 km from Kawasaki
- Platforms: 2 island platforms
- Connections: Bus stop

Other information
- Status: Staffed
- Website: Official website

History
- Opened: 1 November 1927

Passengers
- FY2019: 8,243

Services
| Preceding station | JR East | Following station |
|---|---|---|
| Fuchu-Hommachi JN20 towards Tachikawa | Nambu Line Rapid | Inadazutsumi JN16 towards Kawasaki |
| Minami-Tama JN19 towards Tachikawa | Nambu Line Local | Yanokuchi JN17 towards Kawasaki |
Location
- Location within Tokyo Location within Japan

Inagi-Naganuma Station (稲城長沼駅, Inagi-Naganuma-eki) is a passenger railway station located in the city of Inagi, Tokyo, Japan, operated by East Japan Railway Company (JR East).

== Lines ==
Inagi-Naganuma Station is served by the Nambu Line, and is situated 24.1 km (15.0 mi) from the terminus of the line at Kawasaki Station.

== Station layout ==
The station consists of two elevated island platforms, serving four tracks, connected by a footbridge. The station is staffed.

=== Platforms ===
| 1-2 | Nambu Line | for Noborito, Musashi-Mizonokuchi, Musashi-Kosugi, and Kawasaki |
| 3-4 | Nambu Line | for Fuchūhommachi, Bubaigawara, and Tachikawa |

== History ==
The station opened on 1 November 1927. With the privatization of JNR on 1 April 1987, the station came under the control of JR East.

By 2013, all facilities were transitioned into a new elevated station.

== Passenger statistics ==
In fiscal 2019, the station was used by an average of 8,243 passengers daily (boarding passengers only).

The passenger figures for previous years are as shown below.

| Fiscal year | Daily average |
|---|---|
| 2005 | 6,799 |
| 2010 | 6,584 |
| 2015 | 7,096 |

== Surrounding area ==
- Inagi Municipal Inagi 3rd Elementary School

== See also ==
- List of railway stations in Japan
- Armored Trooper VOTOMS - A life-size statue of Votoms is on display in front of the station.
