= TeamLab Planets TOKYO DMM.com =

Art facility in Tokyo, Japan

teamLab Planets TOKYO DMM
- Former name: DMM.Planets Art by teamLab
- Established: July 7, 2018
- Location: teamLab Planets TOKYO, 6-1-16 Toyosu, Koto City, Tokyo, Japan
- Coordinates: 35°38′56.67″N 139°47′22.29″E
- Type: Digital art
- Collection size: 10,000 square meters
- Visitors: 2,504,264 (2023 fiscal year)
- Architect: teamLab Architects
- Owners: PLANETS Co., Ltd.
- Public transit access: Shin-toyosu Station; Toyosu Station
- Website: www.teamlab.art/e/planets/

teamLab Planets TOKYO DMM.com is an art museum that utilizes digital technology and was established by teamLab and DMM.com. It is located in 6-chome, Toyosu, Koto-ku, Tokyo.

== Overview ==
"DMM.Planets Art by TeamLab" was first held in Odaiba in 2016 and then scaled up and opened in Shin-Toyosu, with an original exhibition period set from 7 July 2018 until the end of 2020. It comprises 4 large-scale artwork spaces and 2 gardens created by art collective teamLab. By immersing the entire body with other people in these massive "Body Immersive" artworks, the boundary between the body and the artwork dissolves, the boundaries between the self, others, and the world become something continuous, and we explore a new relationship without boundaries between ourselves and the world.

In the third year since its opening, the "Garden" was added on July 2, 2021 with the addition of two large garden works. The first of which being a garden filled with countless orchids blooming in the air, that rise and fall as the viewer approaches. The second of the two new exhibitions is a moss garden with brilliant egg-shaped sculptures whose appearance changes based on the time of day.

Customers enter the museum barefoot to experience some of the artworks, as there are areas in which the customer will enter water. At the time of opening, the original exhibition period was until autumn 2020, but has since been extended several times. First until the end of 2022, again until the end of 2023, and then, due to the continued popularity of the exhibition, a further extension until the end of 2027.

On January 22, 2025, teamLab Planets expanded its site by 1.5 times, opening a large new area called "Forest". This area consists of the creative movement space "Athletic Forest", an educational project for co-creation called "Future Park", and "Catching and Collecting Forest", featuring over 20 new artworks. With this expansion, some areas were newly established or renamed, and teamLab Planets was renovated into a museum composed of four areas: "Water", "Garden", "Forest", and "Open-Air".

In the "Water" area, visitors need to be barefoot as there are exhibits where you enter the water. The "Garden" and "Forest" areas can be experienced with shoes on.

In 2023, teamLab Planets was recognized as "Asia's Leading Tourist Attraction 2023" at the World Travel Awards, which honors outstanding services and tourist destinations in the travel industry. It was the first time a Japanese attraction was recognized as the leading destination in Asia.

Furthermore, from April 1, 2023 to March 31, 2024, teamLab Planets welcomed 2,504,264 visitors, earning it a Guinness World Record as the most visited museum by a single art group in the world. Additionally, in Google's annual search ranking "Year in Search 2023", it ranked 5th among the "World's Most Popular Museums". On December 15, 2023, it was ranked 1st in the "Inbound Popular Tourist Destination Ranking Nationwide" announced by Hounichi Lab.

== Artworks ==
=== Water ===
- Waterfall of Light Particles at the Top of an Incline
- Soft Black Hole - Your Body Becomes a Space that Influences Another Body
- The Infinite Crystal Universe
- Drawing on the Water Surface Created by the Dance of Koi and People -Infinity
- Ephemeral Solidified Light
- Expanding Three-Dimensional Existence in Transforming Space - Flattening 3 Colors and 9 Blurred Colors, Free Floating

=== Garden ===
- Floating Flower Garden; Flowers and I are of the Same Root, the Garden and I are One -Released on July 2, 2021
- Moss Garden of Resonating Microcosms - Solidified Light Color, Dusk to Dawn -Released on July 2, 2021

=== Forest -Released on January 22, 2025 ===
==== Athletic Forest ====
- Rapidly Rotating Bouncing Spheres in the Caterpillar House
- Multi Jumping Universe
- Aerial Climbing through a Flock of Colored Birds
- Balance Stepping Stones in the Invisible World
- Graffiti Nature
- Sketch Waterfall Droplets
- Beating Earth
- Sliding through the Fruit Field
- Waterfall Droplets, Flowing Down a Slope
- Flutter of Butterflies from the Caterpillar House
- Autonomous Abstraction
- Existence in the Flow Creates Vortices

==== Future Park ====
- Sketch Umwelt World
- A Table where Little People Live
- A Musical Wall where Little People Live
- A Window to the Universe where Little People Live

==== Catching and Collecting Forest ====
- Catching and Collecting Extinct Forest

=== Open-Air -Released on January 22, 2025 ===
- Universe of Fire Particles Haunting the Sky and Earth
- Nursery Lamps in Spontaneous Order
- Tea and Sake in Spontaneous Order
- Reversible Rotation in the Black Emptiness
- Pocket Gardens in the City Cracks
- Pocket Forest Block
- Dusk to Dawn / Forest, Wind and Light Paintings - Dusk to Dawn
- Vortex Sea: Waves and Whirlpools

=== Factory & Shop -Released on January 22, 2025 ===
- Cognitive Solidified Spark
- Open Environment Eternity
- Open Environment Eternal Existence

== Timeline ==
- July 7, 2018: Opened in Toyosu, Tokyo for a limited time until the end of 2020.
- December 20, 2018: Changed some artworks to a winter version. Started a collaboration menu with a Toyosu Fish Market related businesses.
- March 15, 2019: Start of limited-time version with cherry blossoms in some artworks.
- July 7, 2019: On the 1st anniversary of opening, began a limited-time version with sunflowers in some of the artworks.
- August 29, 2019: Started a limited-time version with autumn leaves and chrysanthemums in some artworks.
- August 8, 2019: One year since its opening in July, 2018, the museum has welcomed over 1.25 million visitors from 106 countries and regions around the world.
- February 16, 2020: Two artworks of cherry blossom art released for a limited time.
- June 1, 2020: The museum, after being temporarily closed to prevent the spread of the novel coronavirus in Japan and overseas, announced it would resume operation from June 5, 2020 restricting the number of visitors.
- July 16, 2020: In two years of operation, 1.8 million people visited the museum. A new work "Universe of Water Particles Falling from the Sky" was released.
- April 7, 2021: the work "Universe of Fire Particles Falling from the Sky" changes from the currently in-place water theme to a fire theme, being renamed to "Universe of Fire Particles Falling from the Sky".
- July 2, 2021: The "Garden" is added, consisting of two new artworks as part of teamLab Planets 3 year anniversary since opening.
- October 8, 2021: Kyoto based ramen shop UZU Vegan Ramen Tokyo opens in the plaza of teamLab Planets, along with new public artwork spaces Reversible Rotation- Non-Objective Space, Table of Sky and Fire; and the teamLab Flower Shop where visitors can take home the orchids used in one of the museum’s artworks.
- September 1, 2022: The museum announces an extension to the exhibition period until the end of 2023.
- August 29, 2023: As part of the museum's 5 year anniversary since opening, the new artwork Ephemeral Solidified Light is opened to the public, alongside renovations to several of the museums existing artworks.
- September 6, 2023: Announced as Asia's Leading Tourist Attraction in the 2023 World Travel Awards.
- July 5, 2024: A dedicated shuttle bus service (paid) began operating between the Ginza area in Tokyo and the facility
- July 9, 2024: It was announced that the total number of visitors from January to December 2023 reached 2,412,495.
- July 10, 2024: The total number of visitors from April 1, 2023, to March 31, 2024, was recorded at 2,504,264. The museum was recognized by Guinness World Records as the most visited museum in the world by a single art group. On the same day, it was also announced that a large new area would open in early 2025. This new area will include the creative movement space "Athletic Forest," an educational project for co-creation called "Future Park," and "Catching and Collecting Forest
- January 22, 2025: With the opening of the new area, more than 20 new artworks were unveiled. A major renovation of the outdoor space was also revealed.

== Ticket Types ==
=== Entrance Pass (Admission Ticket) ===
Entrance passes are available as advance tickets and same-day tickets, both purchasable only through the website. The prices for advance and same-day tickets are the same. The museum uses a time-slot reservation system with 30-minute intervals and dynamic pricing based on the date and time of entry.

Prices (as of March 2025):

- Adults (18 years and older): From 4,000 JPY
- Junior high and high school students: 2,800 JPY
- Children (4-12 years old): 1,500 JPY
- Disability discount: From 2,000 JPY

=== Premium Pass ===
A Premium Pass is also available, allowing entry through a dedicated lane at any time during operating hours (from opening until one hour before closing) on the specified date. The Premium Pass can only be purchased through Klook.

- Per person: 12,000 JPY

Note：Children under 3 years old enter free. Children under elementary school age must be accompanied by at least one guardian (18 years or older) per five children. Junior high and high school students must present a student ID when using the "Junior high / High school" ticket.

== Food and Beverage Services ==
=== Vegan Ramen UZU Tokyo / Cafe UZU ===
The facility features "Vegan Ramen UZU Tokyo," which opened on October 8, 2021. As of January 22, 2025, it became exclusive to teamLab Planets visitors.

Menu (as of March 2025):

- Miso Ramen Vegan UZU style (Tokyo exclusive): 2,000 JPY
- Vegan Ice Cream (Vanilla, Matcha Coconut, Chocolate, Yuzu, Choco Banana, Strawberry): 800 JPY each (Vanilla 900 JPY)
- Vegan Muffins (Pecan Nut and Banana, Griotte and Amarena Cherry, Chocolate): 900 JPY each
- Various teas and beverages: 550-800 JPY

=== Glass House ===
Offers tea, alcohol, and other beverages.

== In-Facility Services ==
=== Living Art Store ===
Sells regrown flowers used in the "Floating Flower Garden" installation.

=== Sketch Factory ===
Visitors can purchase merchandise featuring their drawings from the "Graffiti Nature" and "Sketch Umwelt World" installations.

== Official Apps ==
=== teamLab App ===
A guide app that provides artwork concepts based on the visitor's location within the facility.

Compatible with Android 9+ and iOS 15.0+ (as of February 2025).

=== PlanetsTokyo/CollectingForest ===
Used in the "Catching and Collecting Forest of Extinct Animals" installation.

Compatible with Android 11+ and iOS 17.0+ (as of February 2025).

=== Sketch Umwelt World ===
Allows visitors to control their drawn objects in the "Sketch Umwelt World" installation.

Compatible with Android 9+ and iOS 15.7+ (as of February 2025).

=== Distributed Fire ===
Used in the "Fire Falling from the Sky and Accumulating on the Ground" installation.

Compatible with Android 9+ and iOS 15.0+ (as of February 2025).
