= Yanokuchi Station =

Railway station in Inagi, Tokyo, Japan

JN17 Yanokuchi Station 矢野口駅
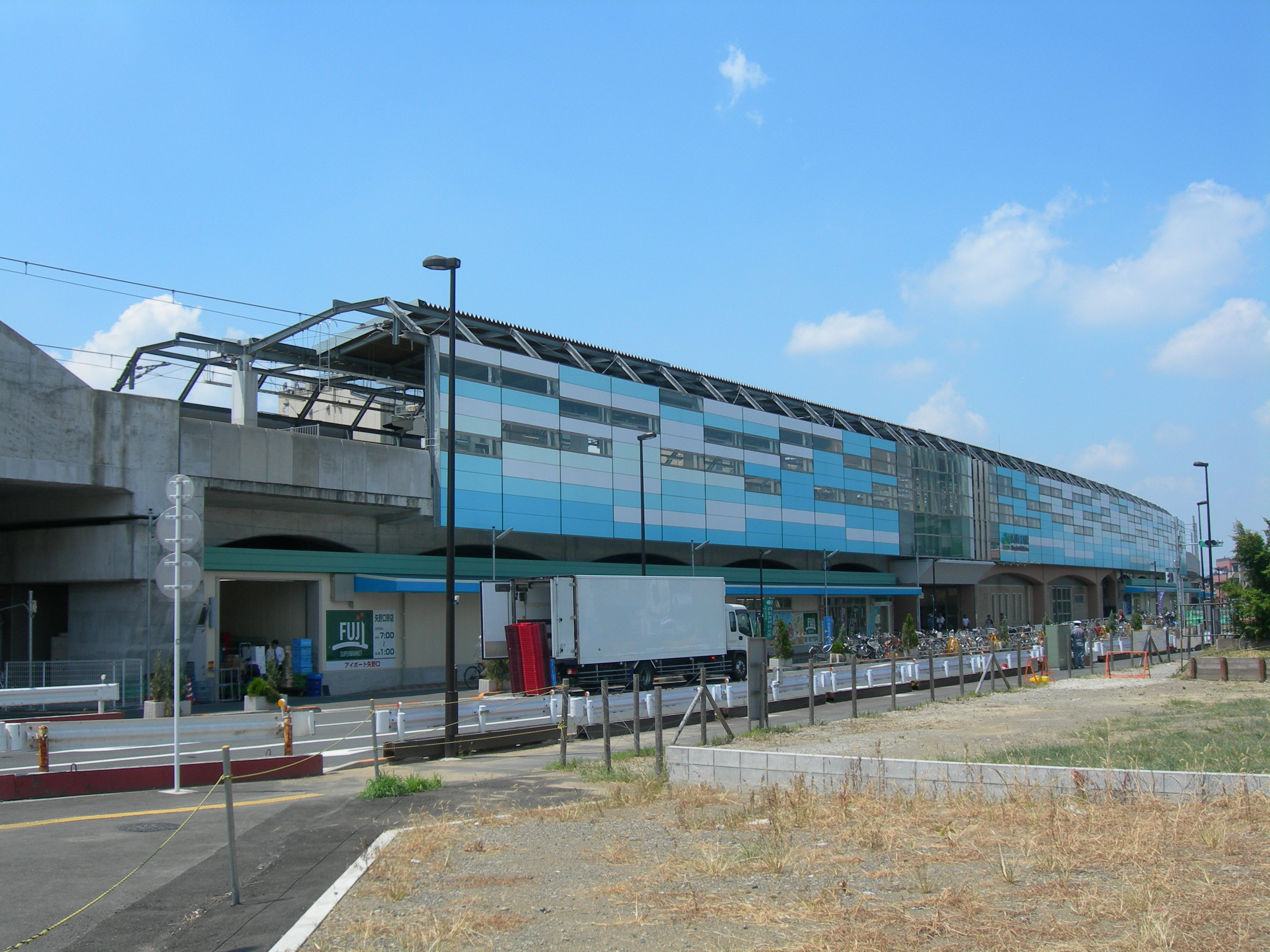
- Yanokuchi Station, August 2008

General information
- Location: Yanokuchi, Inagi-shi, Tokyo 206-0812; Japan
- Coordinates: 35°38′30.13″N 139°31′13.66″E
- Operator: JR East
- Line: Nambu Line
- Distance: 22.4 km from Kawasaki
- Platforms: 1 island platform
- Connections: Bus stop

Other information
- Status: Staffed
- Website: Official website

History
- Opened: 1 November 1927

Passengers
- FY2019: 10,147

Services
Preceding station	JR East	Following station
Inagi-Naganuma JN18 towards Tachikawa	Nambu Line Local	Inadazutsumi JN16 towards Kawasaki
Location
- Location within Tokyo Location within Japan

Yanokuchi Station (矢野口駅, Yanokuchi-eki) is a passenger railway station located in the city of Inagi, Tokyo, Japan, operated by East Japan Railway Company (JR East).

== Lines ==
Yanokuchi Station is served by the Nambu Line, and is situated 22.4 km (13.9 mi) from the terminus of the line at Kawasaki Station.

== Station layout ==
The station consists of one elevated island platform, with the station building located underneath. The station is staffed.

=== Platforms ===
1	Nambu Line	for Nishi-Kunitachi and Tachikawa
2	Nambu Line	for Fuchū-Hommachi and Kawasaki

== History ==
The station opened on 1 November 1927. With the privatization of JNR on 1 April 1987, the station came under the control of JR East.

== Passenger statistics ==
In fiscal 2019, the station was used by an average of 10,147 passengers daily (boarding passengers only).

The passenger figures for previous years are as shown below.

Fiscal year	Daily average
2005	7,314
2010	9,044
2015	10,004

== Surrounding area ==
- Amelia Inagi Shopping Center
- Yanokuchi Post Office

== See also ==
- List of railway stations in Japan
