= Komazawa Women's Junior College =

Coordinates: 35°37′39.7″N 139°29′36.3″E

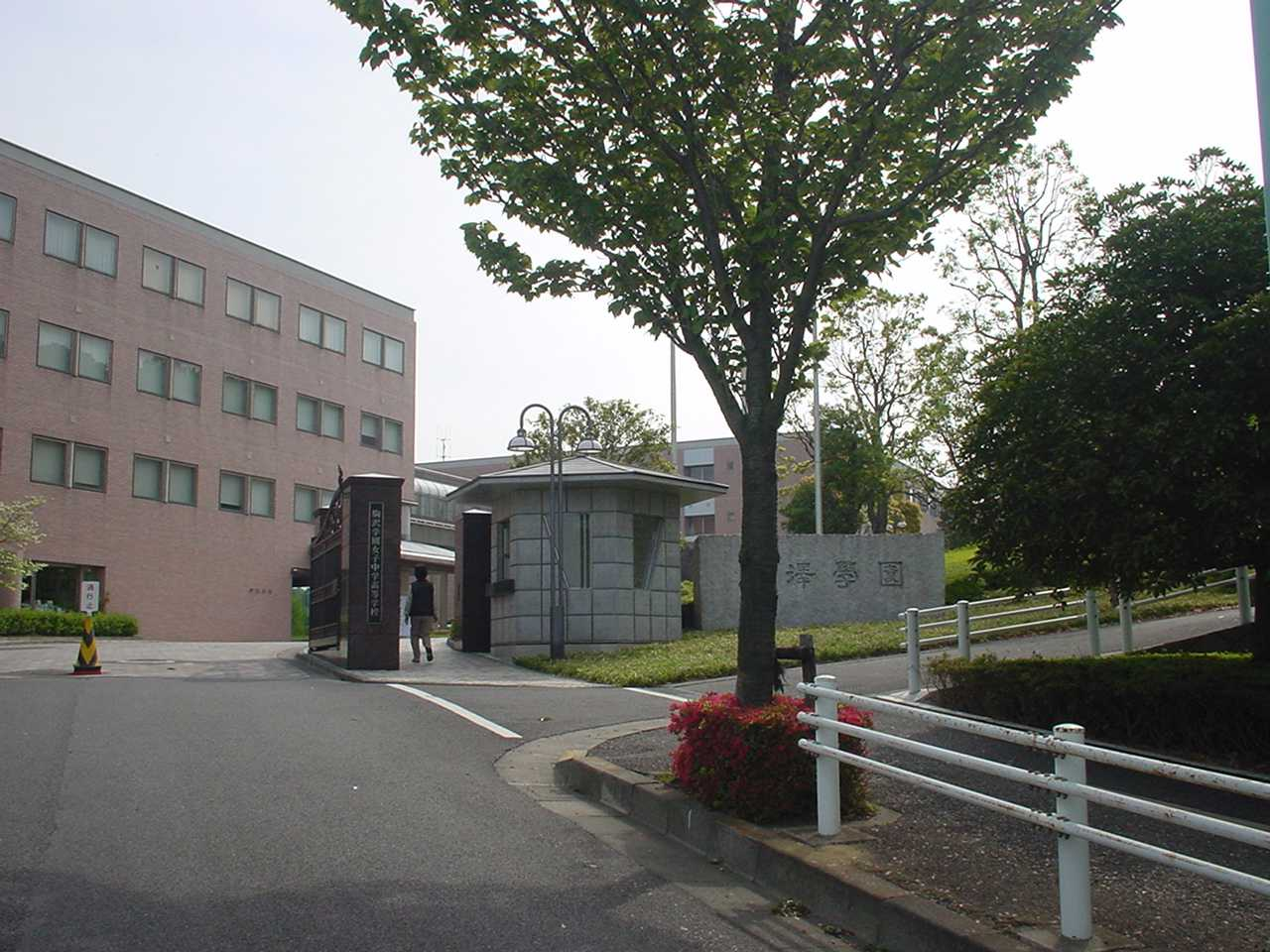
Komazawa Women's Junior College

Komazawa Women's Junior College (駒沢女子短期大学, Komazawa joshi tanki daigaku) is a private women's junior college in Inagi, Tokyo, Japan. The precursor of the school was founded in 1928, and it was chartered as a university in 1965.
