= Komazawa Women's University =

Coordinates: 35°37′39.7″N 139°29′36.3″E

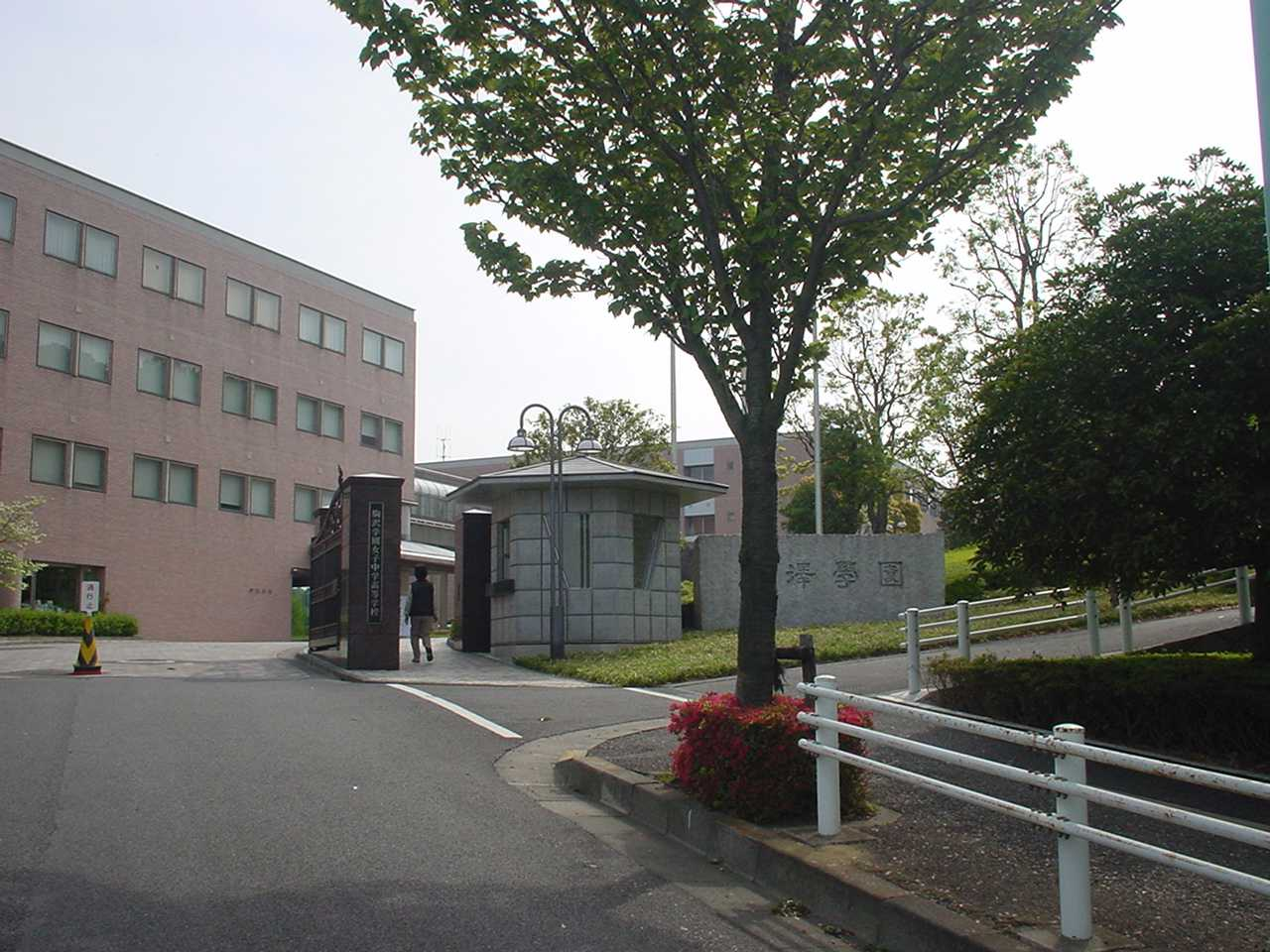
Komazawa Women's University

Komazawa Women's University (駒沢女子大学, Komazawa joshi daigaku) is a private university in Inagi, Tokyo, Japan. The predecessor of the school was founded in 1927, and it was chartered as a university in 1993.
