= Shin-toyosu Station =

Railway station in Tokyo, Japan

Coordinates: 35.6485°N 139.7899°E

U15 Shin-toyosu Station 新豊洲駅
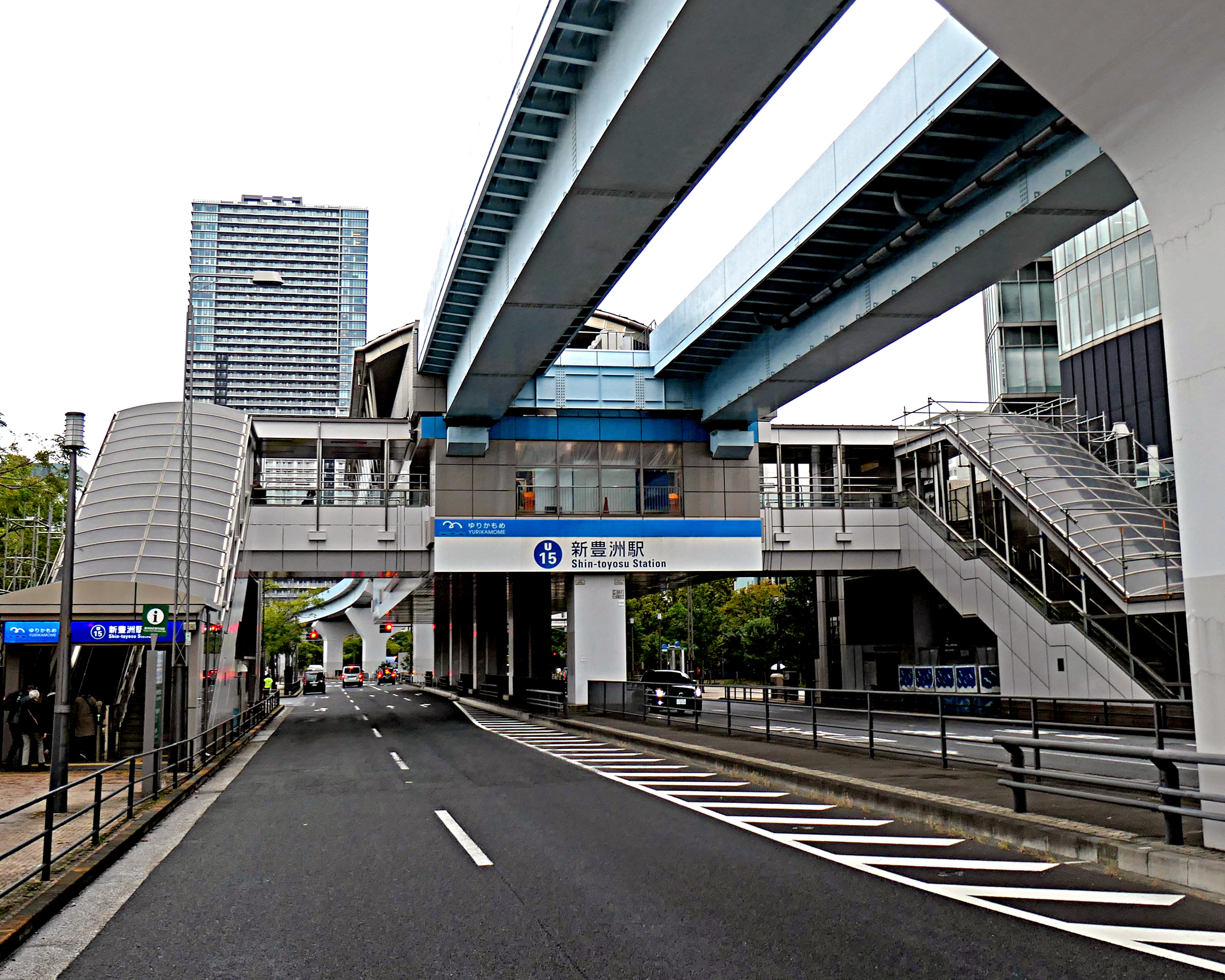
- Exterior of the station

General information
- Location: Kōtō, Tokyo; Japan
- Operator: Yurikamome, Inc.
- Line: Yurikamome
- Connections

Other information
- Station code: U-15

History
- Opened: 27 March 2006

Passengers
- FY2023: 11,256 (daily)

Services
Preceding station	Yurikamome	Following station
Shijō-mae U14 towards Shimbashi	New Transit Yurikamome	Toyosu U16 Terminus
Location

Shin-toyosu Station (新豊洲駅, Shin-Toyosu-eki) is a railway station on the Yurikamome Line, in Kōtō, Tokyo, Japan. It is numbered "U-15".

== Station layout ==
The station consists of an elevated island platform.

=== Platforms ===
1	Yurikamome	for Toyosu
2	Yurikamome	for Daiba and Shimbashi

== History ==
The station opened on 27 March 2006.

== Surrounding area ==
The area around the station is the site of ongoing building projects, part of long-term plans to develop the Ariake area, which lies to the east of the Odaiba complex of residential, commercial, and research facilities.

Shin-toyosu serves the TeamLab Planets immersive art museum.
