= Inada Park =

- 稲田公園
- Interactive map of Inada Park
- Location: 2-9-1 Sugeinadazutsumi, Tama, Kawasaki, Kanagawa Prefecture 214-0003
- Coordinates: 35°38′15″N 139°32′15″E
- Website: Inada Park

Inada Park (稲田公園, Inada Kōen) is a park located in the district of Sugeinadazutsumi, Tama Ward, Kawasaki City, Kanagawa Prefecture.

Since 2005 the park has been the location of the "Osakana Post" organized by the non-profit organization of the same name. Many fish owners have dumped their unwanted pets into the river. The "Osakana Post" is a service where fish owners can drop their fish off. From 2005 to 2012 around 10,000 fish were dumped into the tank. Many of these have been kept at the home of Mitsuaki Yamasaki, one of the leaders of the NPO, and the NPO arranges for the fish to be taken by new owners, either private individuals or schools.
