= Nippon Filcon =

Japanese manufacturing company

Nippon Filcon Co., Ltd 日本フイルコン株式会社
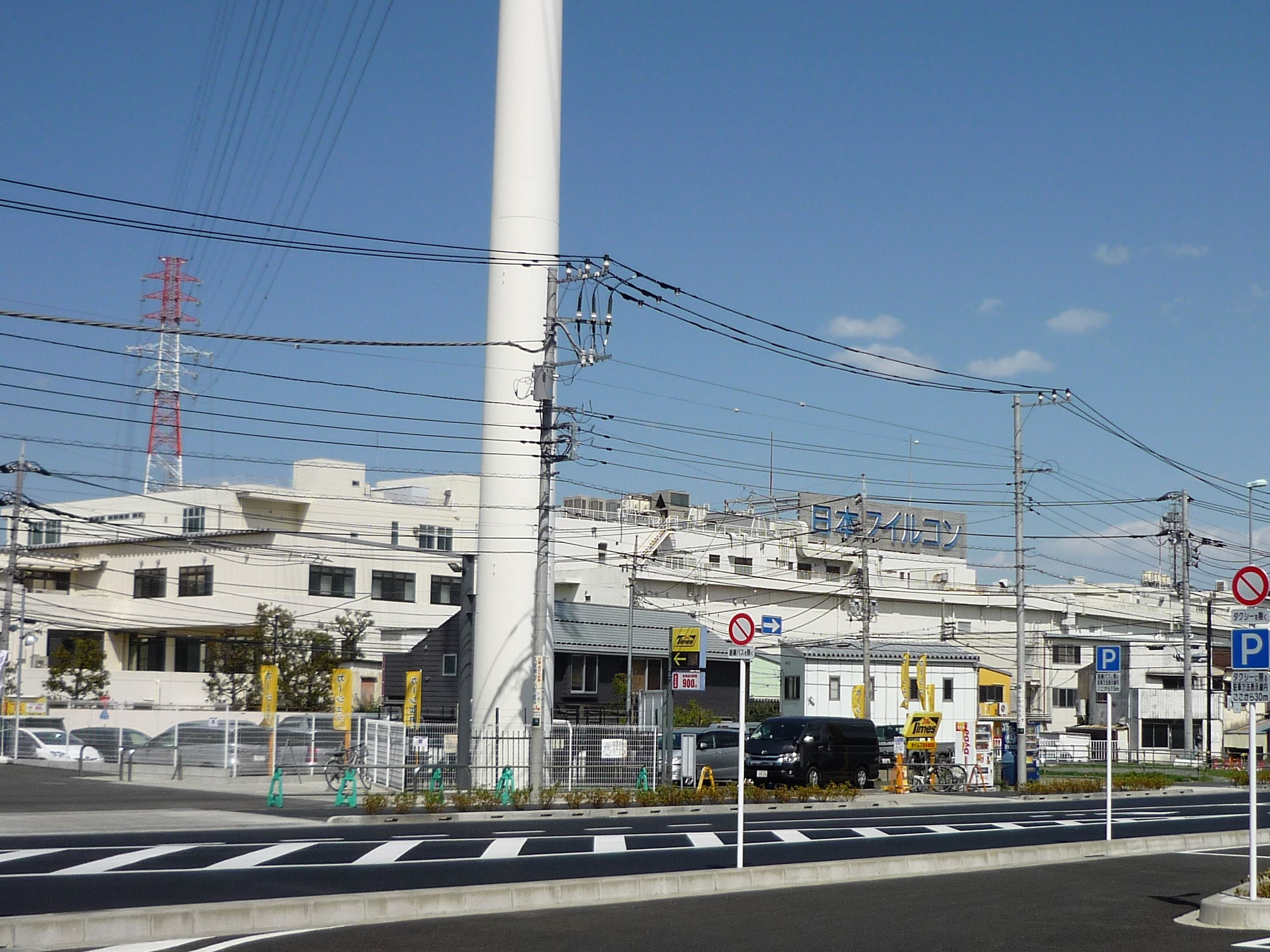
- Nippon Filcon Headquarters
- Company type: Corporation TYO: 5942
- Industry: Paper
- Headquarters: Tokyo, Japan
- Products: Mesh, Photomask
- Website: www.filcon.co.jp/index.html/

Nippon Filcon (日本フイルコン, Nippon Firukon), established in 1936, is a Japanese manufacturing company.
