= Tourism EXPO Japan =

Tourism Expo Japan (ツーリズムEXPOジャパン abbreviated as "TEJ") is Japan's largest tourism trade show targeting the inbound and outbound markets.

It is organized by the Japan Tourism Association (公益社団法人 日本観光振興協会), Japan Association of Travel Agents (JATA or 一般社団法人 日本旅行業協会), and Japan National Tourism Organization (JNTO or 日本政府観光局).

Held annually in autumn for four days, TEJ uses Japan's largest trade show halls in Tokyo and other major Japanese cities. The expo venue usually alternates yearly between Tokyo Big Sight and another major city like Osaka.

== Trade show content ==
The expo features booths by all or most of the 47 Japanese prefectures, major Japanese destinations and attractions, 70 to 80 countries/regions, and well over 1,000 companies and organizations.

The trade show floor is organized into Japanese and overseas sections. Smaller sections are provided for travel industries such as airlines, cruise industry, hotels, travel agencies, and other businesses. TEJ is also held together with the Travel Solutions Exhibition geared for direct business meetings with tourism industry professionals.[1]

The first two days are reserved for industry and media people, while the last two days on Saturday and Sunday are open to the public.

To attract public interest, many booths offer crowd-pleasing entertainment on their own small stage, free food or drink samples, free crafts-making lessons, interactive games, tourist pamphlets, and experts to answer travel questions.

Many booths put on performances by native dancers, singers, or musicians. There are also large entertainment stages for larger audiences.

Food courts with food stalls from various parts of Japan offer a taste of local delicacies.

For travel industry and media people, TEJ offers a tourism conference, business meetings, travel awards, and evening reception.

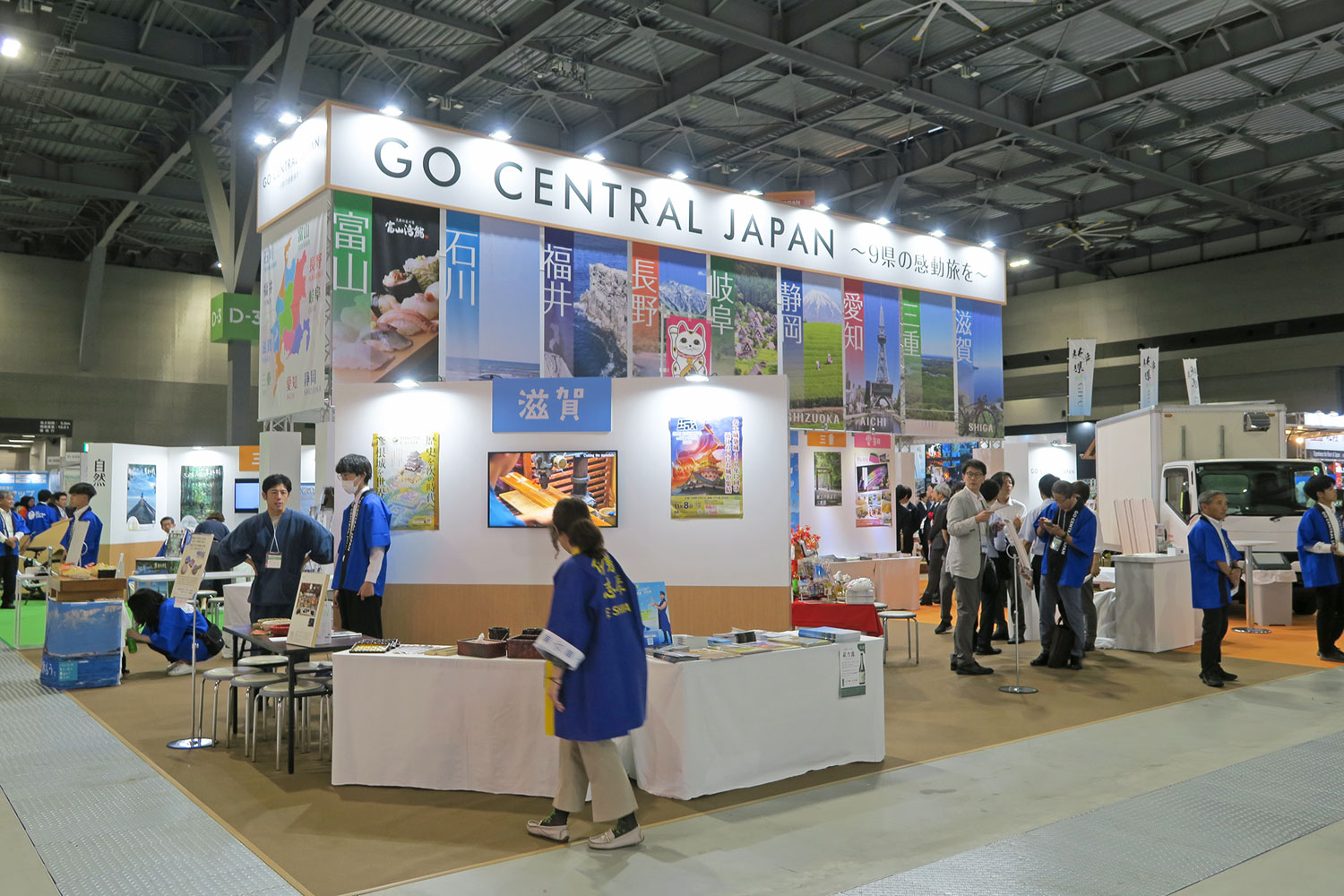
Central Japan Booth, Tourism Expo Japan 2025.

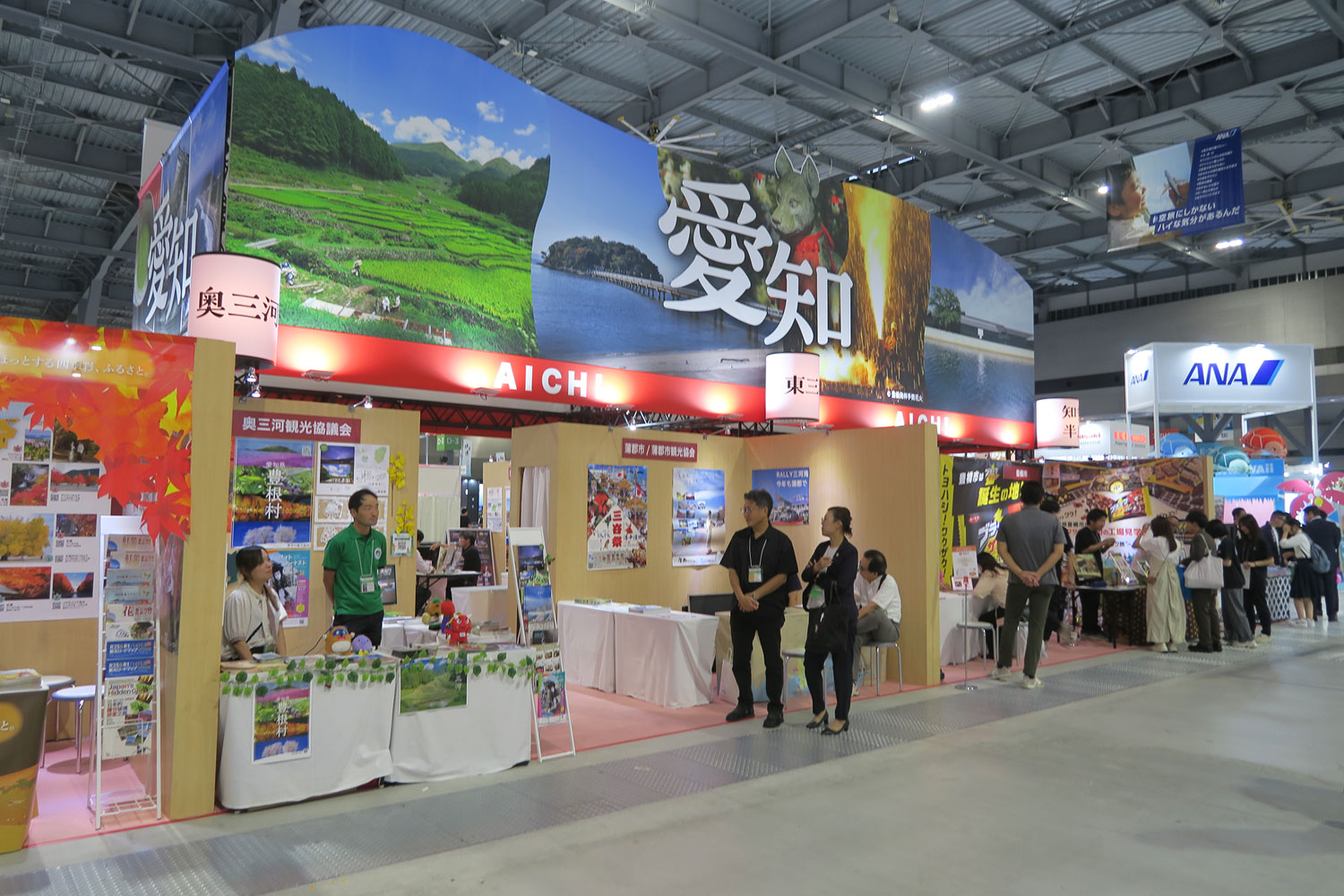
Aichi Booth, Tourism Expo Japan 2025.

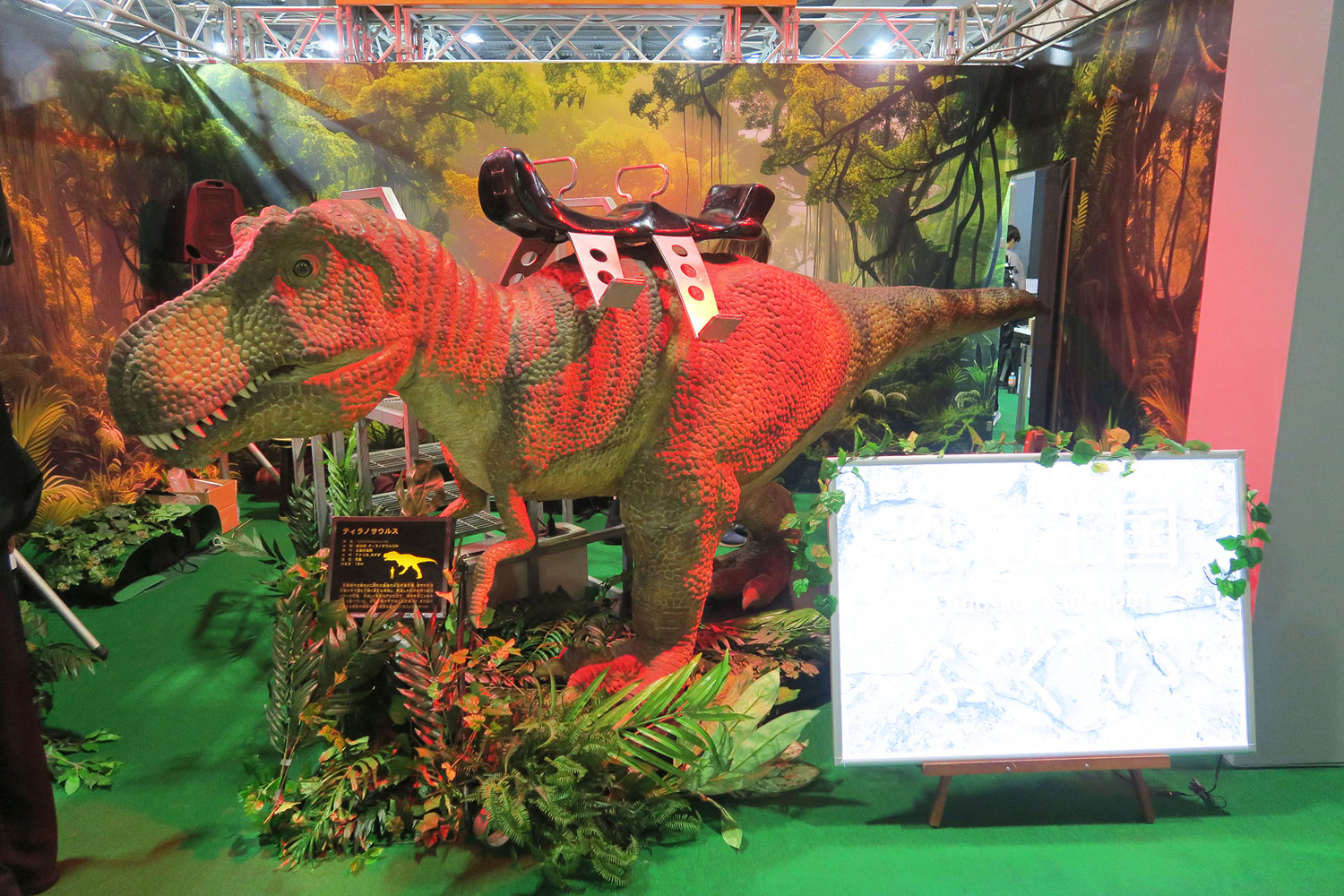
T-Rex model at Fukui Booth, Tourism Expo Japan 2025.
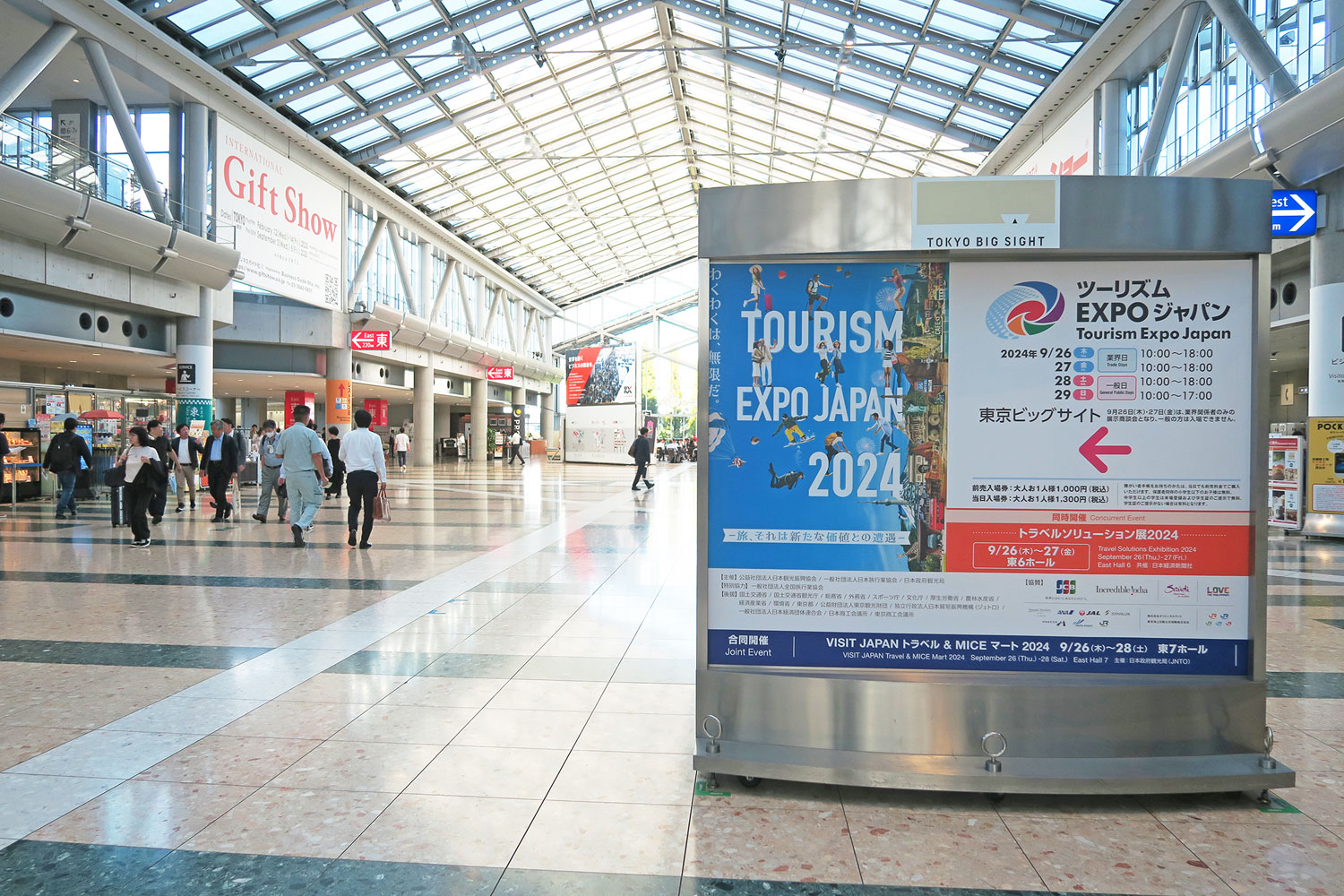
Tourism Expo Japan signage inside Tokyo Big Sight in September 2024.

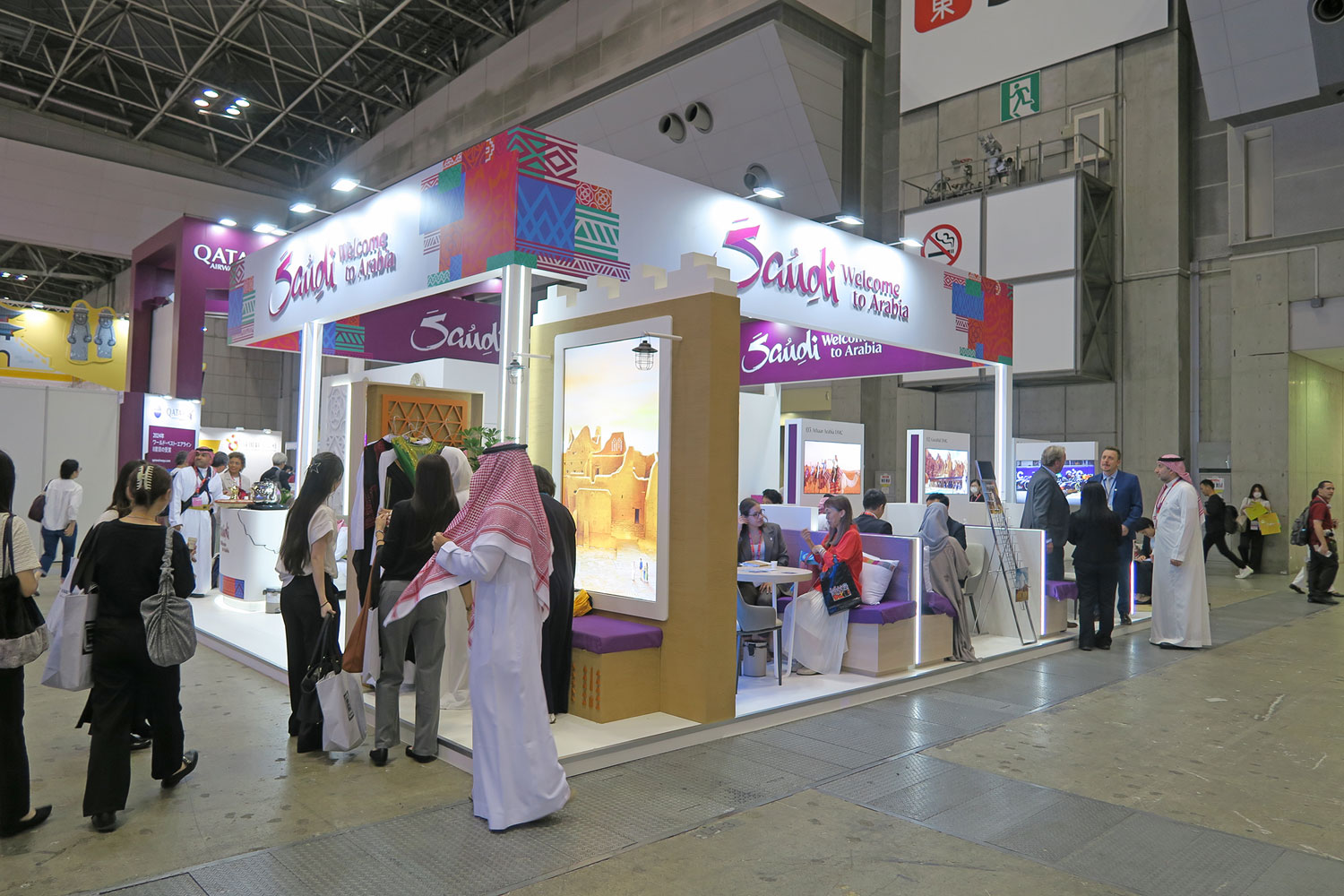
Saudi Arabia booth at Tourism Expo Japan at Tokyo Big Sight in September 2024.

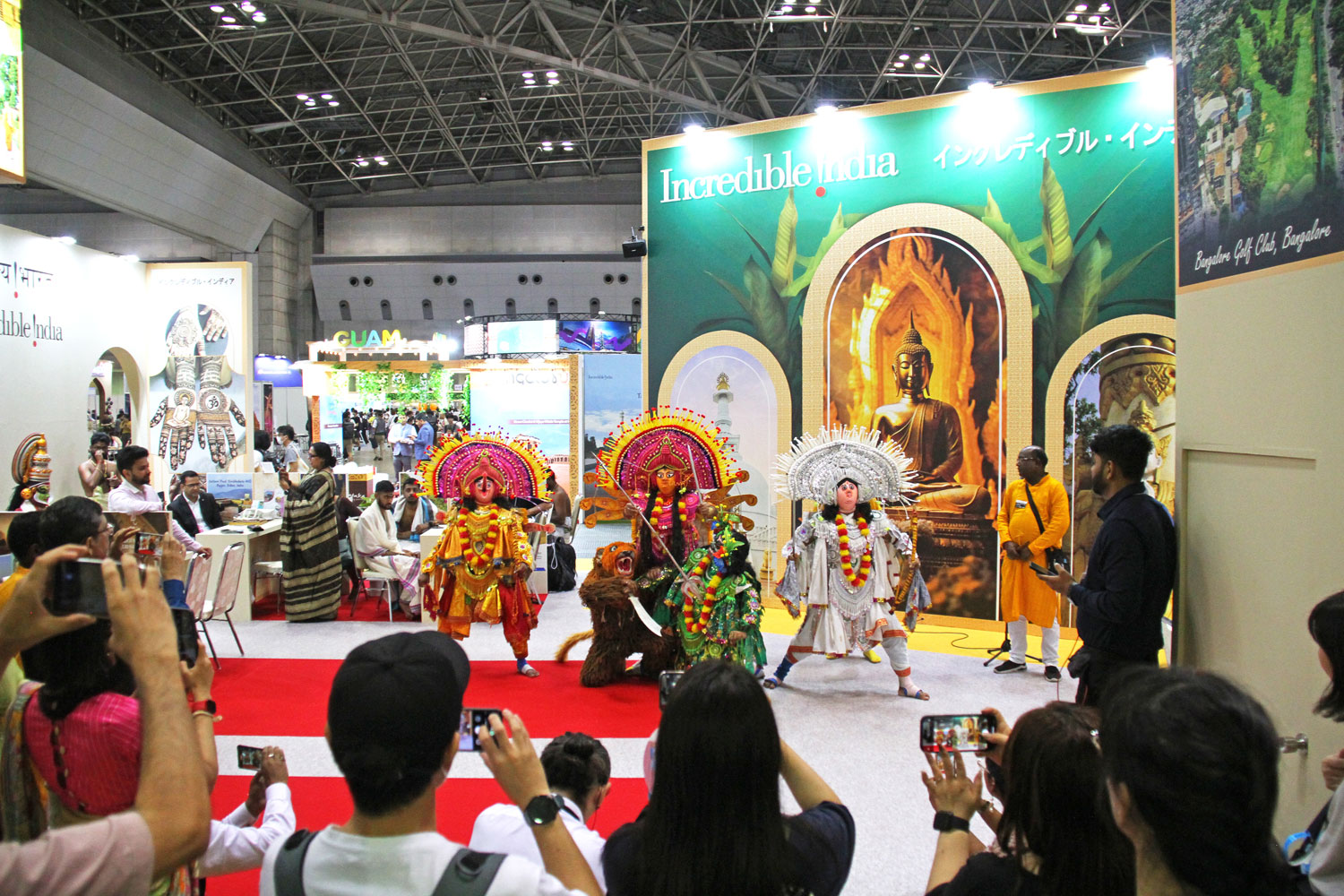
India booth dance performance at Tourism Expo Japan at Tokyo Big Sight in September 2024.

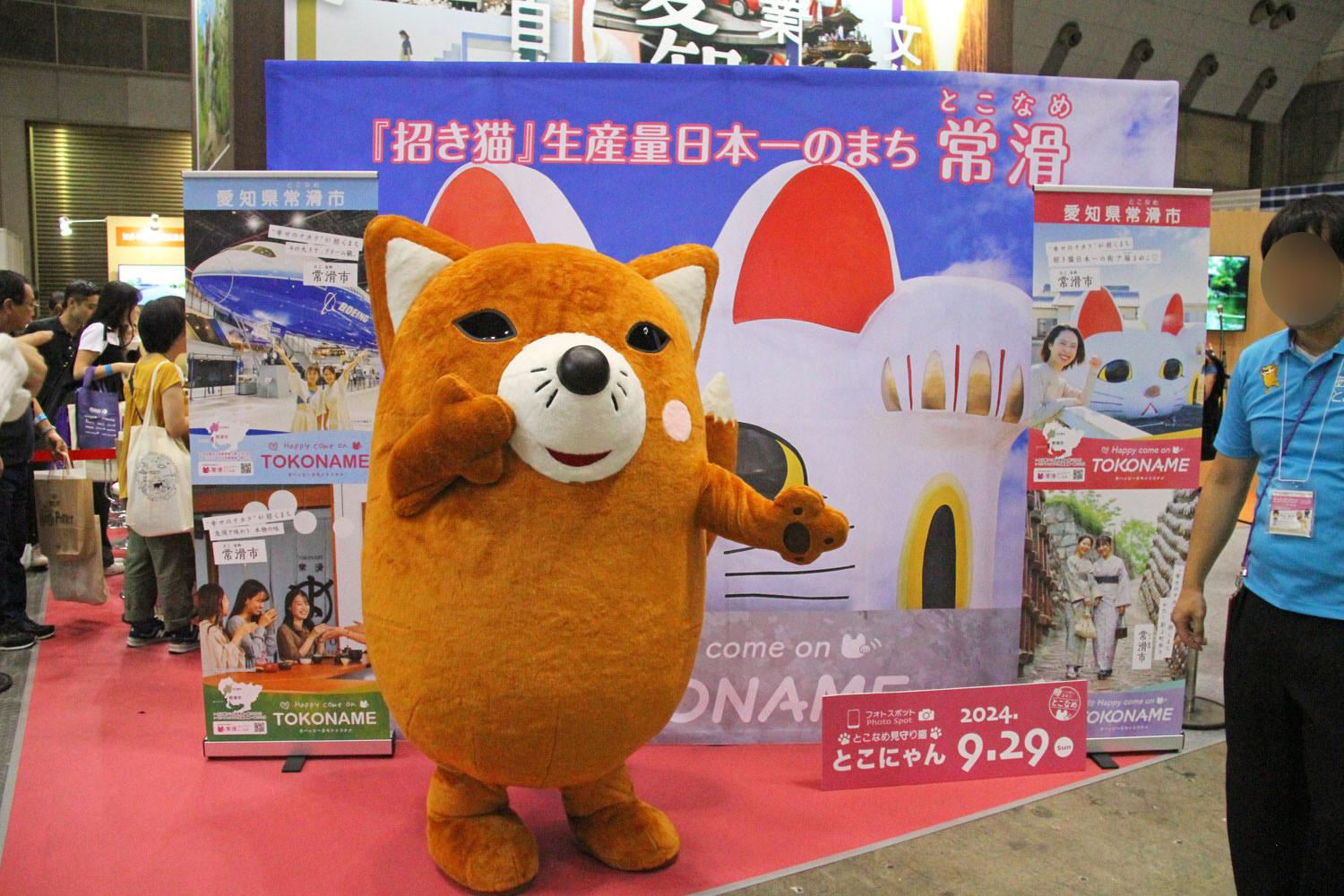
Toko-nyan mascot at Tokoname booth (Tokoname, Aichi Prefecture) at Tourism Expo Japan 2024, Tokyo Big Sight.
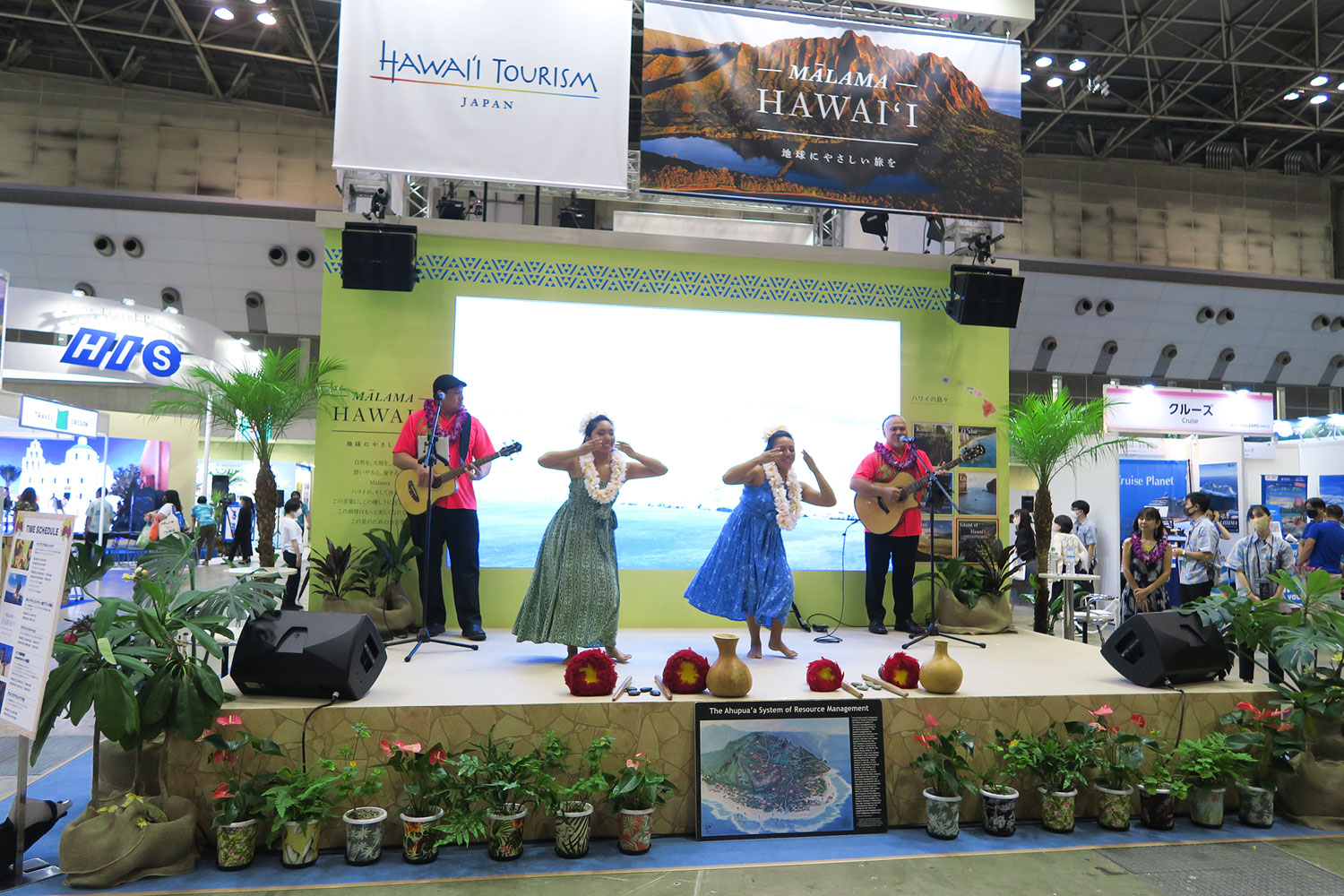
Hawaii booth entertainment at Tourism Expo Japan at Tokyo Big Sight in September 2022. Kale Hannahs and Weldon Kekauoha performing.

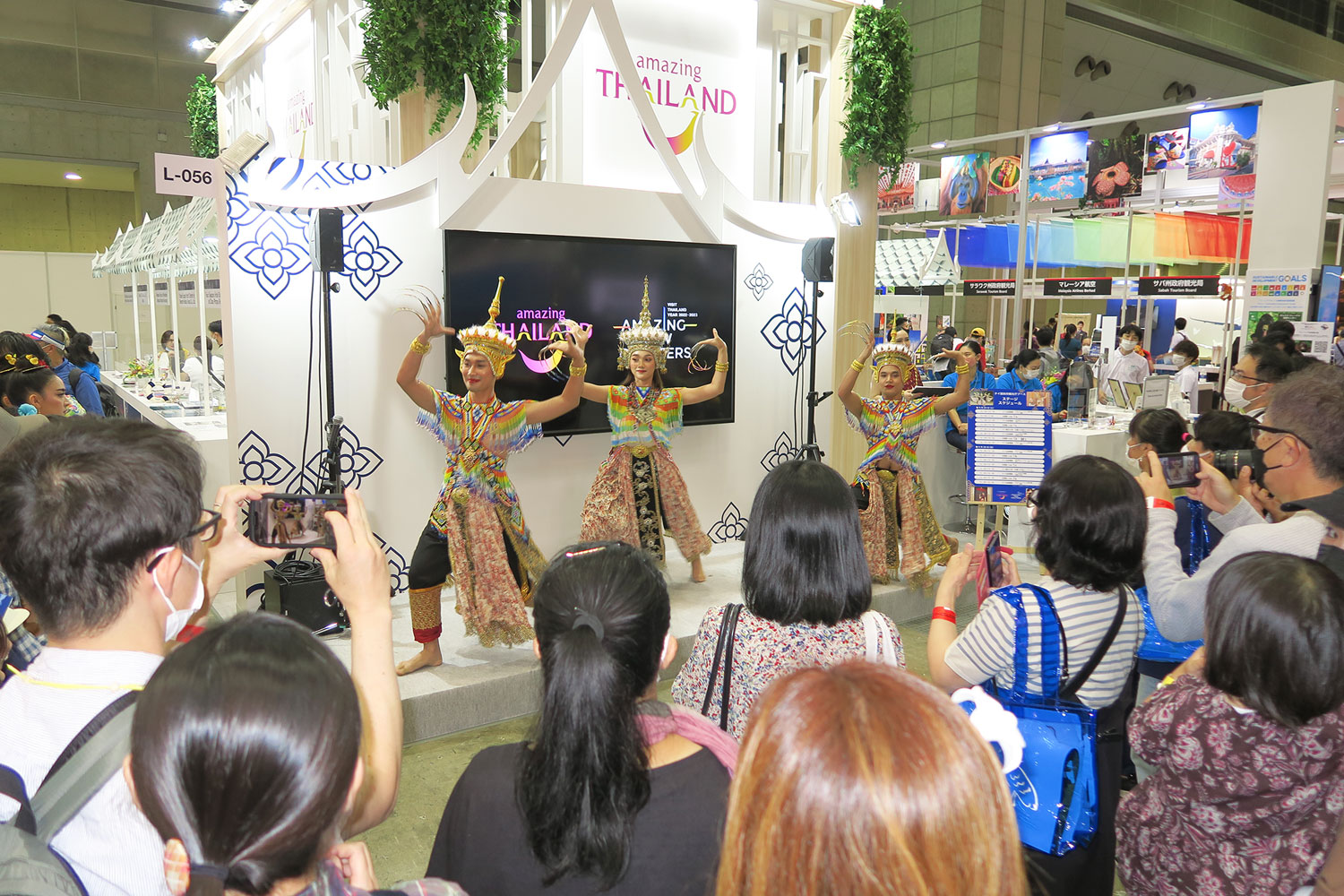
Thailand booth dancers at Tourism Expo Japan at Tokyo Big Sight in September 2022.

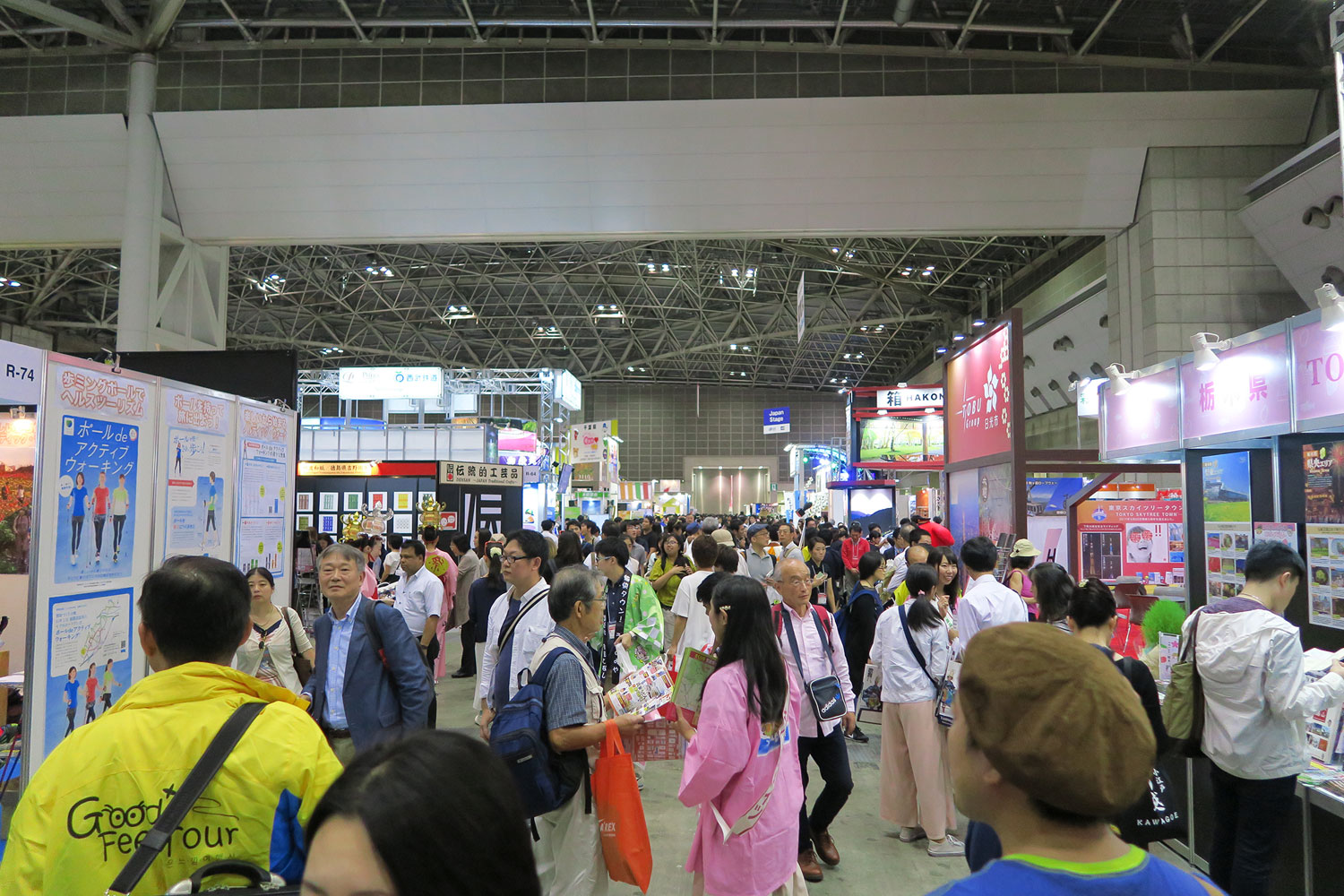
Tourism Expo Japan trade show floor in September 2017 at Tokyo Big Sight.

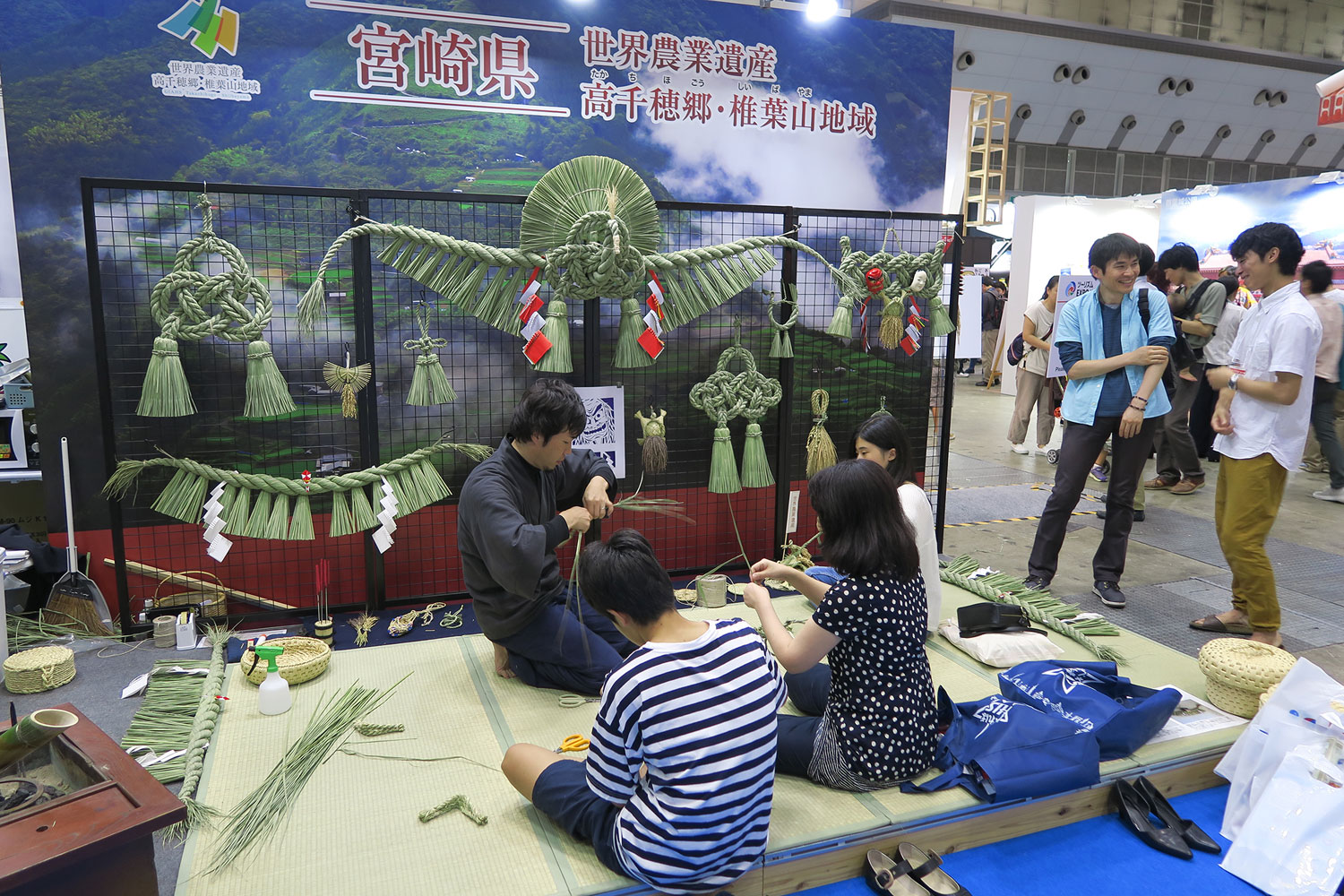
Straw weaving lesson by Miyazaki Prefecture at Tourism Expo Japan 2017, Tokyo Big Sight.
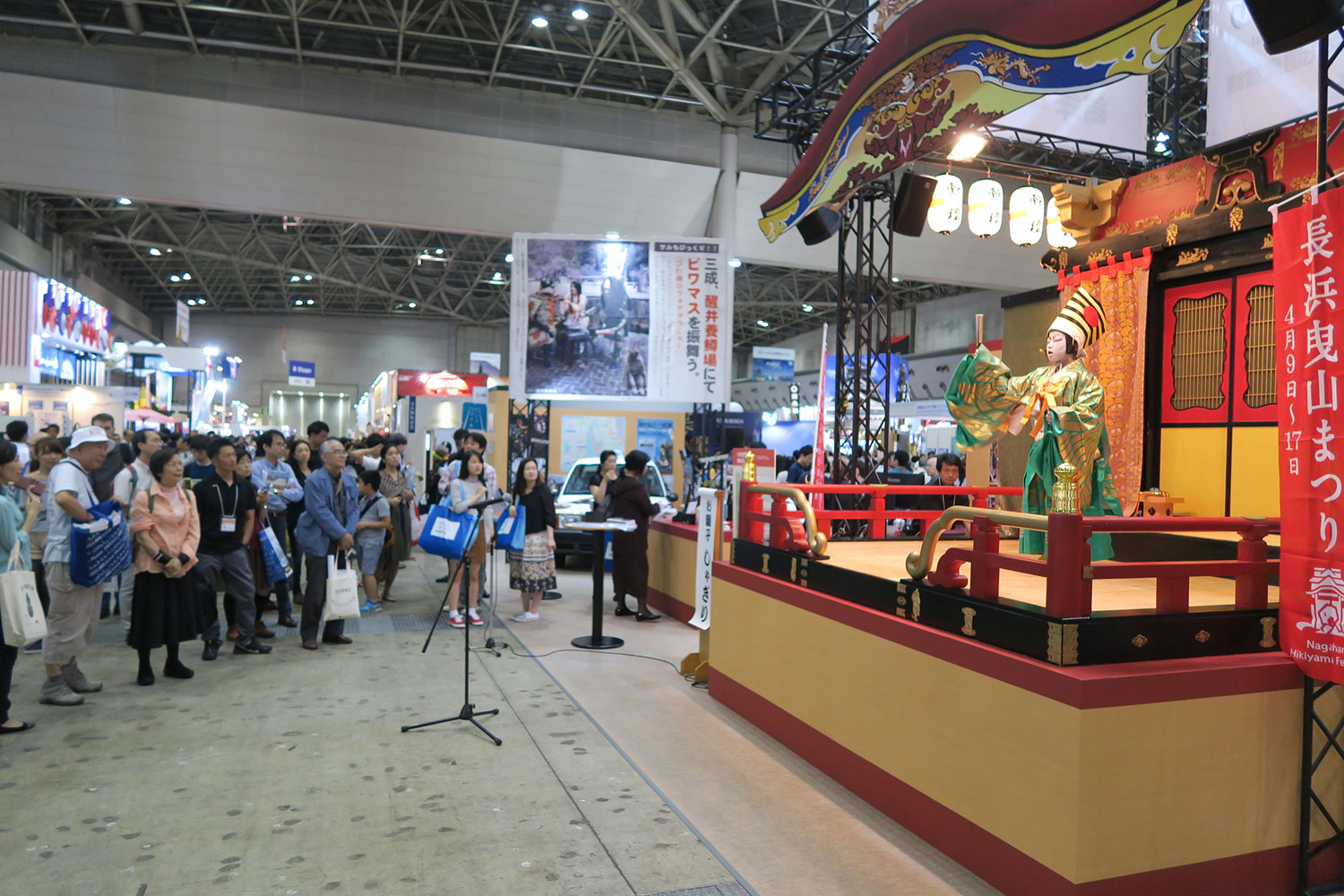
Shiga booth at Tourism Expo Japan in September 2016 at Tokyo Big Sight. Performance of Nagahama Hikiyama Matsuri's Sambaso dance by child kabuki actor.

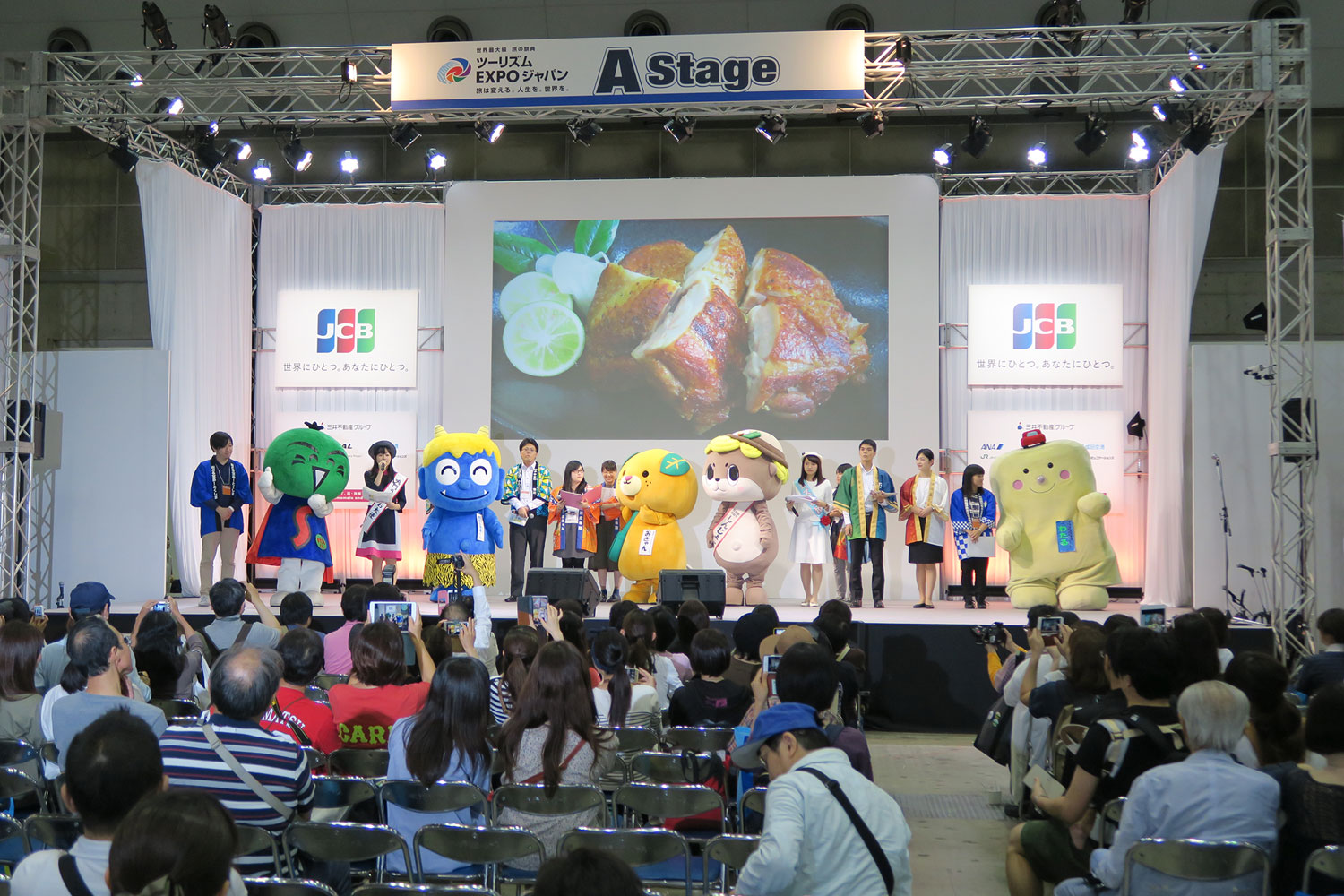
Entertainment stage featuring mascots from Shikoku at Tourism Expo Japan 2016, Tokyo Big Sight.

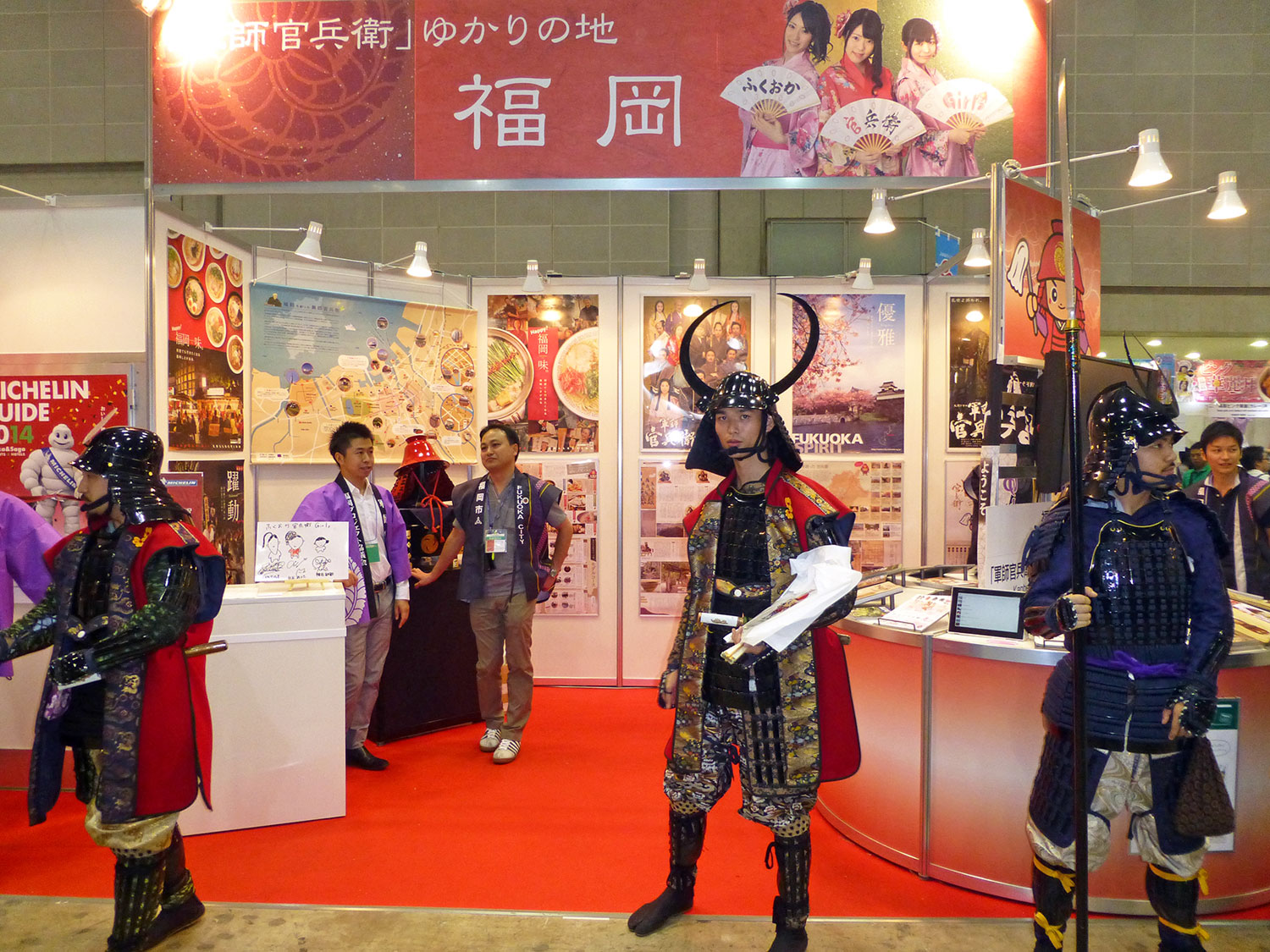
Fukuoka booth at Tourism Expo Japan in September 2014 at Tokyo Big Sight.

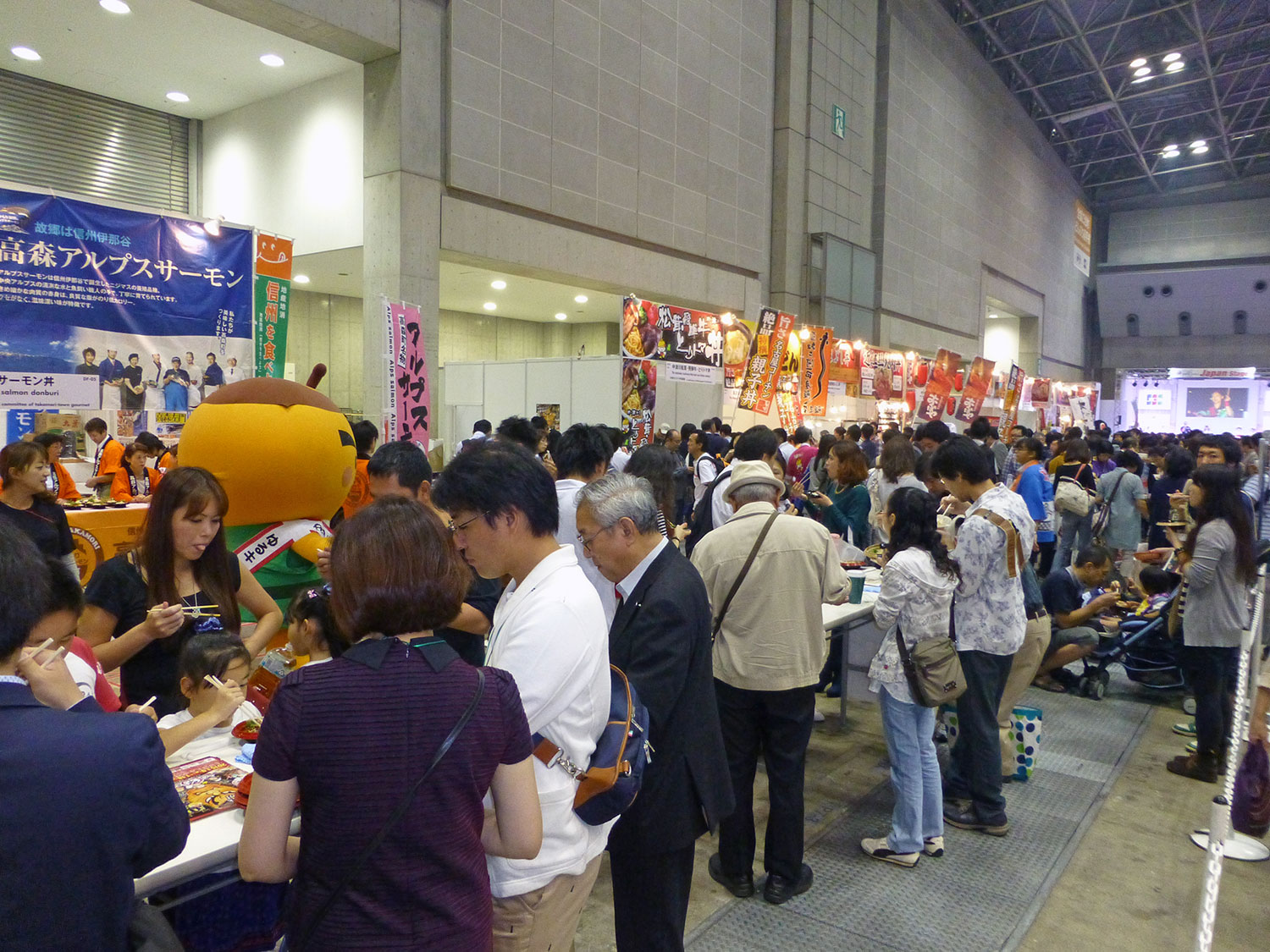
Food court at Tourism Expo Japan 2014, Tokyo Big Sight.

== History and Past Tourism Japan Expos ==
Tourism Expo Japan was started in 2014 upon the merger of two previous travel trade shows in Japan. One was JATA Tabihaku (JATA旅博) held from 1977 by the Japan Association of Travel Agents (JATA), and the other was Tabi Fair Nihon (旅フェア日本) held from 1995 by the Japan Tourism Association (JTA). Both trade shows were held in alternate years.

Tourism Expo Japan 2014

- Dates: September 25th–28th
- Venue: Tokyo Big Sight
- Total visitors: 157,589

Tourism Expo Japan 2015

- Dates: September 24th–27th
- Venue: Tokyo Big Sight
- Total visitors: 173,602

Tourism Expo Japan 2016

- Dates: September 22nd–25th
- Venue: Tokyo Big Sight
- Total visitors: 185,844

Tourism Expo Japan 2017

- Dates: September 21st–24th
- Venue: Tokyo Big Sight
- Total visitors: 191,577

Tourism Expo Japan 2018

- Dates: September 20th– 23rd
- Venue: Tokyo Big Sight
- Total visitors: 207,352

Tourism Expo Japan 2019

- Dates: October 24th–27th
- Venue: Intex Osaka
- Total visitors: 151,099
- Held outside Tokyo for the first time.

Tourism Expo Japan 2020

- Dates: October 29th–November 1st
- Venue: Okinawa Convention Center (Ginowan, Okinawa)
- Total visitors: 24,174

Tourism Expo Japan 2021 (Cancelled due to COVID-19)

- Planned dates: November 25th–28th
- Planned venue: Intex Osaka
- Total visitors: --

Tourism Expo Japan 2022

- Dates: September 22nd–25th
- Venue: Tokyo Big Sight
- Total visitors: 124,074

Tourism Expo Japan 2023

- Dates: October 26th–29th
- Venue: Intex Osaka
- Total visitors: 148,062

Tourism EXPO Japan 2024

- Dates: September 26th–29th
- Venue: Tokyo Big Sight
- Total visitors: 182,934

Tourism EXPO Japan 2025

- Dates: September 25th–28th
- Venue: Aichi Sky Expo
- Exhibitors: 1,474 booths (442 from overseas) by 82 countries/regions, 45 Japanese prefectures, 1,350 companies and organizations
- Business meetings: 6,071 between 826 sellers and 703 buyers
- Total visitors: 127,677

Tourism EXPO Japan 2026

- Dates: September 24th–27th
- Venue: Tokyo Big Sight
- Total visitors: TBA

Tourism EXPO Japan 2027

- Dates: TBA
- Venue: TBA
- Total visitors: TBA
- The first two days are reserved for industry and media people, while the last two days on Saturday and Sunday are open to the public.
- Visitor counts taken from official website.
