= The Mortifying Ordeal of Being Seen =

Japanese manga series

- First tankōbon volume cover

となりの席のヤツがそういう目で見てくる (Tonari no Seki no Yatsu ga Sō Iu Me de Mitekuru)
- Genre: Romantic comedy
- Manga
- Written by: mmk
- Published by: Shogakukan
- English publisher: NA: Viz Media
- Imprint: Sunday Webry Comics
- Magazine: Sunday Webry
- Original run: June 17, 2024 – present
- Volumes: 6

The Mortifying Ordeal of Being Seen (Japanese: となりの席のヤツがそういう目で見てくる, Hepburn: Tonari no Seki no Yatsu ga Sō Iu Me de Mitekuru) is a Japanese manga series written and illustrated by mmk. It began serialization on Shogakukan's Sunday Webry manga service in June 2024.

== Synopsis ==
The series is centered around two classmates named Ikezawa and Eguchi. After a seating change, Eguchi now sits next to Ikezawa, who can't help but notice and talk about her tight blouse which makes her big breasts stand out, to which Eguchi responds saying his neckline makes his chest stand out. The series focuses on the two flirting with and flustering each other.

== Publication ==
Written and illustrated by mmk, The Mortifying Ordeal of Being Seen began serialization on Shogakukan's Sunday Webry manga service on June 17, 2024. Its chapters have been compiled into six tankōbon volumes as of July 2026.

In June 2025, Viz Media announced that they had licensed the series for English publication.

No.	Original release date	Original ISBN	English release date	English ISBN
1	October 10, 2024	978-4-09-853627-6	April 14, 2026	978-1-9747-6249-1
1. "It's Totally a Compliment"; 2. "Is That on Purpose?"; 3. "Defensive Measures"; 4. "Caught by Surprise"; 5. "Sweaty"; 6. "Smells Nice"; 7. "Your Gaze"; 8. "Change of Uniform"; 9. "Making Up"; 10. "Treatment"; 11. "A Visitor"; 12. "Let Me Make It Up to You"; 13. "Perfume"; 14. "Measurements"; 15. "Being Seen"; 16. "Only With You"; 17. "Mortifying"
2	February 12, 2025	978-4-09-853850-8	July 21, 2026	978-1-9747-6307-8
18. "Two Words"; 19. "Taste"; 20. "A Shot for Two"; 21. "Heading Home"; 22. "Reaction"; 23. "Want Me to Touch You?"; 24. "Not Scared at All"; 25. "Spell"; 26. "Underwear"; 27. "Strategy"; 28. "Mouth"; 29. "What Do You Want?"; 30. "Staying After School"; 31. "Hidden Touch"; 32. "Conceited"; 33. "Photo"; 34. "What I Want to Say"
3	June 12, 2025	978-4-09-854129-4	October 13, 2026	978-1-9747-6308-5
35. "Excuse"; 36. "Look over Here"; 37. "It's Showing"; 38. "Comprehension Skills"; 39. "You Wanna Know"; 40. "Entice"; 41. "Doesn't She Want To?"; 42. "First Names"; 43. "Preparing for Battle"; 44. "First Strike"; 45. "Counterattack?"; 46. "Discovery"; 47. "Good Night"; 48. "Delivery"; 49. "All Alone"; 50. "On Her Bed"; 51. "Conditional"
4	October 10, 2025	978-4-09-854265-9	January 12, 2027	978-1-9747-6675-8
5	February 12, 2026	978-4-09-854439-4	—	—
6	July 10, 2026	978-4-09-854697-8	—	—

== Reception ==
The series was nominated for the eleventh Next Manga Awards in 2025 in the digital category, and was ranked eighteenth; it was also nominated for the same award in 2026, and was ranked eleventh. The series topped AnimeJapan's "Manga We Want to See Animated" poll in 2026.
