= AnimeJapan =

Anime convention

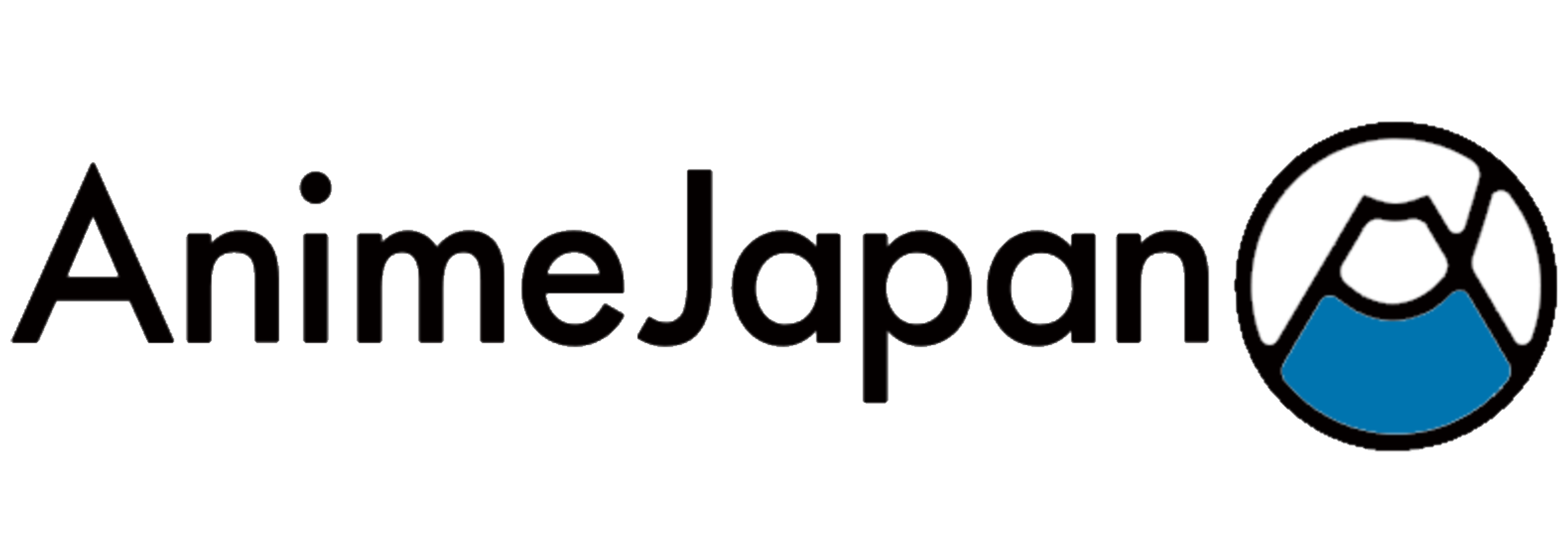

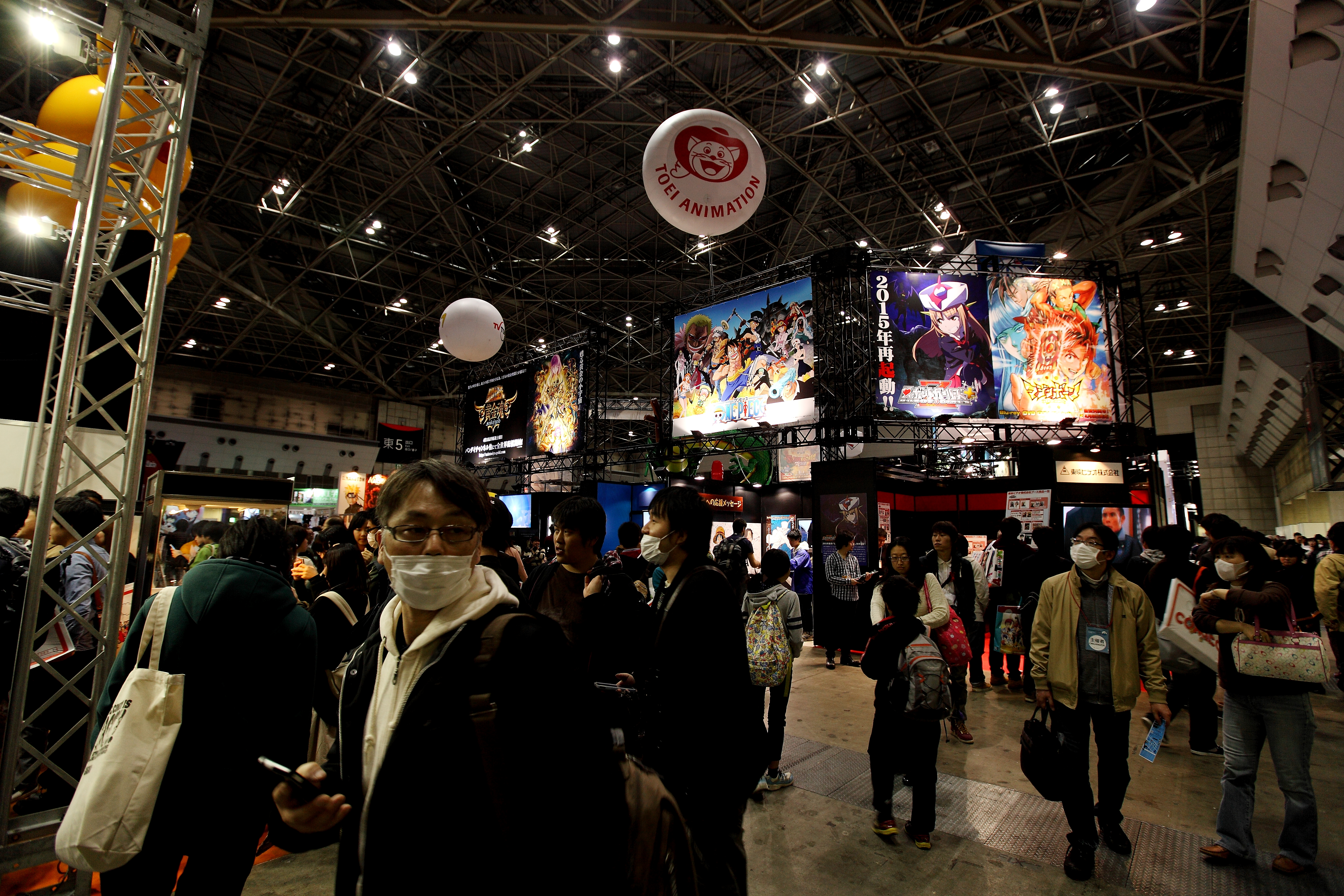
- Status: Active
- Venue: Tokyo Big Sight (2014–2019, 2022–2026); Online (2021); Intex Osaka (2027–present)
- Location: Tokyo
- Country: Japan
- Inaugurated: 2014–present
- Website: www.anime-japan.jp/en

AnimeJapan is a Japanese anime consumer show held annually at the Tokyo Big Sight exhibition center in Tokyo since March 2014. It was created from the merger of the Tokyo International Anime Fair with the Anime Contents Expo.

It is organized by the AnimeJapan Executive Committee with support from The Association of Japanese Animations and The Association of Manga Publishers. The 2020 AnimeJapan event was cancelled due to the COVID-19 pandemic and the event the following year took place online. The event returned to Tokyo Big Sight in 2022.

In 2023, the event re-adopted a split format for the first time since 2019, in which the first two days of the show are open to the public (deemed "Public Days") and the final two are "Business Days" limited toward those in the anime industry.

== AnimeJapan Executive Committee ==
The AnimeJapan Executive Committee is made up of the following 19 companies:

- Animate
- Aniplex
- Bandai Namco Arts
- Bandai Namco Filmworks (Sunrise)
- Frontier Works
- Kadokawa Corporation
- King Records
- Marvelous
- NBCUniversal Entertainment Japan
- Nihon Ad Systems
- Nippon Animation
- Pierrot
- Pony Canyon
- Production I.G
- Satelight
- Shogakukan-Shueisha Productions
- Tezuka Productions
- Toei Animation
- TMS Entertainment

=== Main Event ===
Year	Date	Attendance	Exhibitors	Location
2014	22–23 March	111,252	100+	Tokyo Big Sight
2015	20–22 March	121,540	100+	Tokyo Big Sight
2016	25–27 March	135,323	100+	Tokyo Big Sight
2017	23–26 March	145,453	100+	Tokyo Big Sight
2018	22–25 March	152,331	100+	Tokyo Big Sight
2019	23–26 March	146,616	100+	Tokyo Big Sight
2021	27–30 March	0	0	Online
2022	26–29 March	152,400	100+	Tokyo Big Sight
2023	25–28 March	100,051	100+	Tokyo Big Sight
2024	23–24 March	132,557	100+	Tokyo Big Sight
2025	22–23 March	152,400	100+	Tokyo Big Sight
2026	28–29 March	156,000	100+	Tokyo Big Sight
2027	27–28 March			Intex Osaka
