= Osaka Auto Messe =

Annual auto show in Osaka, Japan

Coordinates: 34.637245°N 135.41818°E

The Osaka Auto Messe (大阪オートメッセ) is an annual auto show that is held at Intex Osaka in Osaka, Japan since 1997. It focuses on modified car and car after parts.

It is one of the biggest auto shows in Japan. Usually, it is held for 3 days on a weekend on the middle of February. More than 200,000 people attend it almost every session. In an ordinary year, most of the famous car makers, parts makers and tuners bring their latest demo-cars to the exhibit.

== History ==
It has been held every year since January, 1997.

- 1997(1st) Intex Osaka 151,741 people
- 1998(2nd) Kyocera Dome Osaka 188,238
- 1999(3rd) Intex Osaka 192,921
- 2000(4th) Intex Osaka 227,423
- 2001(5th) Intex Osaka 228,527
- 2002(6th) Intex Osaka 208,209
- 2003(7th) Intex Osaka 217,345
- 2004(8th) Intex Osaka 225,871
- 2005(9th) Intex Osaka 249,140
- 2006(10th) Intex Osaka 231,005
- 2007(11th) Intex Osaka 249,746 (date: 10 to 12, February, 2007).
- 2008(12th) Intex Osaka 239,677
- 2009(13th) Intex Osaka 236,801
- 2010(14th) Intex Osaka 210,118
- 2011(15th) Intex Osaka 217,037
- 2012(16th) Intex Osaka 205,756
- 2013(17th) Intex Osaka 217,107
- 2014(18th) Intex Osaka 205,545
- 2015(19th) Intex Osaka 219,961
- 2016(20th) Intex Osaka 223,801
- 2017(21st) Intex Osaka 223,983
- 2018(22nd) Intex Osaka 217,507
- 2019(23rd) Intex Osaka 262,277
- 2020 (24th) Intex Osaka 207,479
- 2021 canceled due to COVID-19 outbreak
- 2022 (25th) Intex Osaka 74,909
- 2023 (26th) Intex Osaka 205,462
- 2024 (27th) Intex Osaka 211,738
- 2025 (28th) Intex Osaka 195,730

== Next session ==
2027/February TBA at Intex Osaka

== Study ==
- Avex makes a stage performance show every year. The famous vocalist Kumi Koda appeared on stage there in 2005. Dave Rodgers composed a special song for the expo in 2004 and performed it in the same year as well.
- Tamiya holds their "R/C CAR GRAND PRIX in AUTO MESSE" with a special R/C car circuit link in the site.
