= Tokyo Big Sight =

Convention center in Tokyo, Japan

Tokyo Big Sight (Tokyo International Exhibition Center)

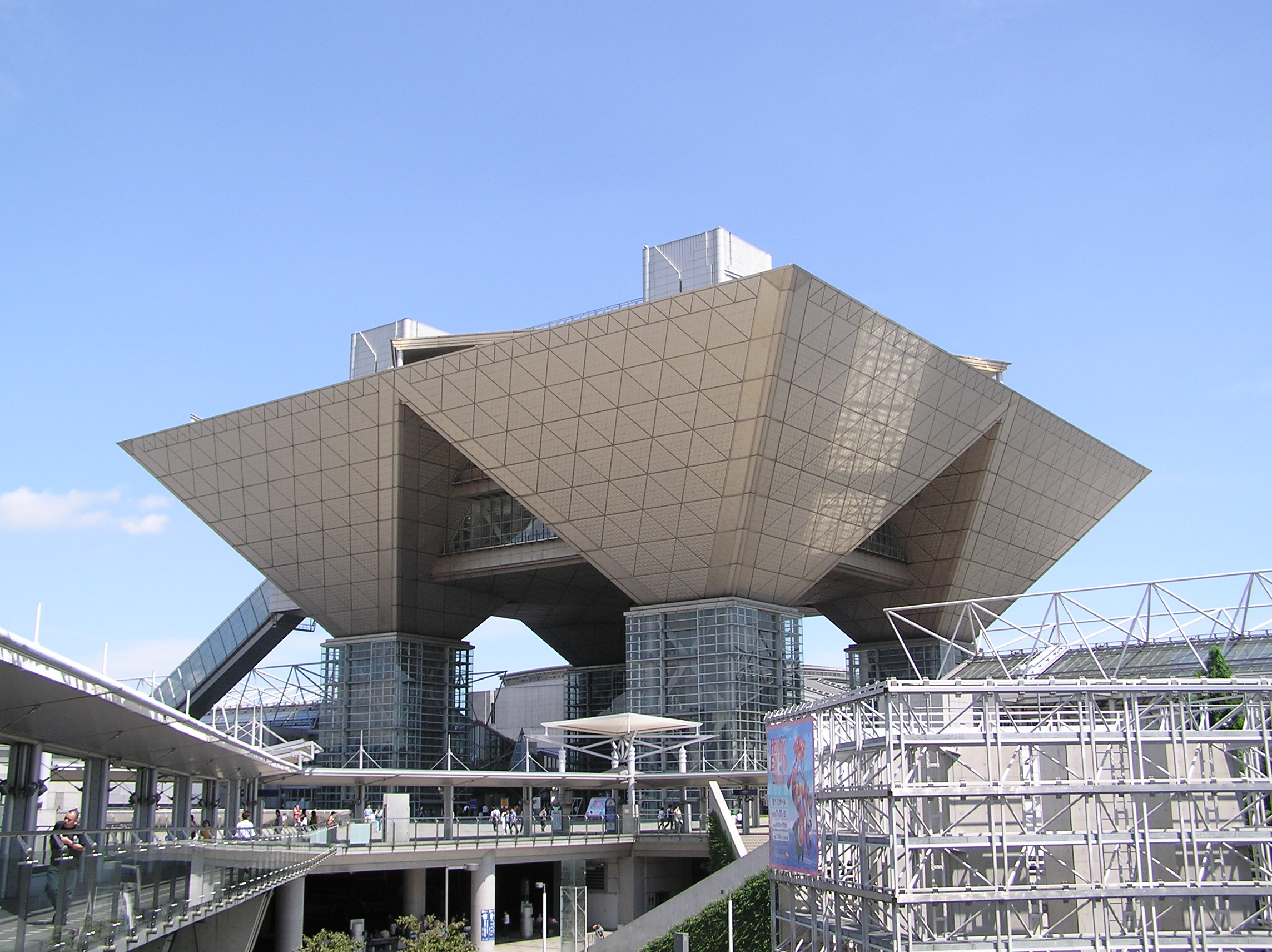
- Conference Tower
- Interactive map of Tokyo Big Sight (Tokyo International Exhibition Center)
- Address: 3-11-1 Ariake, Koto-ku, Tokyo, 135-0063, Japan
- Owner: Tokyo Big Sight Inc. owned ultimately by the Tokyo Metropolitan Government, with Mitsui Fudosan and Toshiba as minority investors
- Operator: Tokyo Big Sight Inc.
- Public transit: Tokyo Big Sight Station (Yurikamome); Kokusai-tenjijo Station (Rinkai Line)

Construction
- Opened: 1 April 1996
- Cost: ¥198.5 billion (¥225 billion in 2024 yen)

Website
- www.bigsight.jp/english/

Tokyo Big Sight
- 東京ビッグサイト (東京国際展示場)
- Interactive map of the Tokyo Big Sight area

General information
- Coordinates: 35°37′47″N 139°47′39″E
- Completed: October 1995
- Cost: 198.5 billion yen

Technical details
- Floor area: 230,873.07 m^{2} (2,485,097.0 sq ft)
- Grounds: 243,419.46 m^{2} (2,620,145.3 sq ft)

Design and construction
- Architecture firm: AXS Satow
- Main contractor: Hazama JV

Tokyo Big Sight (東京ビッグサイト, Tōkyō Biggu Saito), officially known as Tokyo International Exhibition Center (東京国際展示場, Tōkyō Kokusai Tenjijō), is a convention and exhibition center in Tokyo and the largest such venue in Japan. Opened in April 1996, the center is located in the Ariake Minami district of the Tokyo Waterfront City on the Tokyo Bay waterfront. Its most iconic feature is the visually distinctive Conference Tower. The name Tokyo Big Sight in Japanese eventually became the official name, and it also became the name of the operator in April 2003.

The center hosts the Comiket convention since 1996 and the AnimeJapan convention since 2014. It previously hosted the Tokyo International Anime Fair from 2002 to 2013. It was a planned venue for the 2020 Summer Olympics hosting wrestling, fencing and taekwondo events, but the reduction of public funds forced the organization committee to choose an alternative location for these events; it instead served as the main broadcasting and press center for the Games.

== Location and components ==
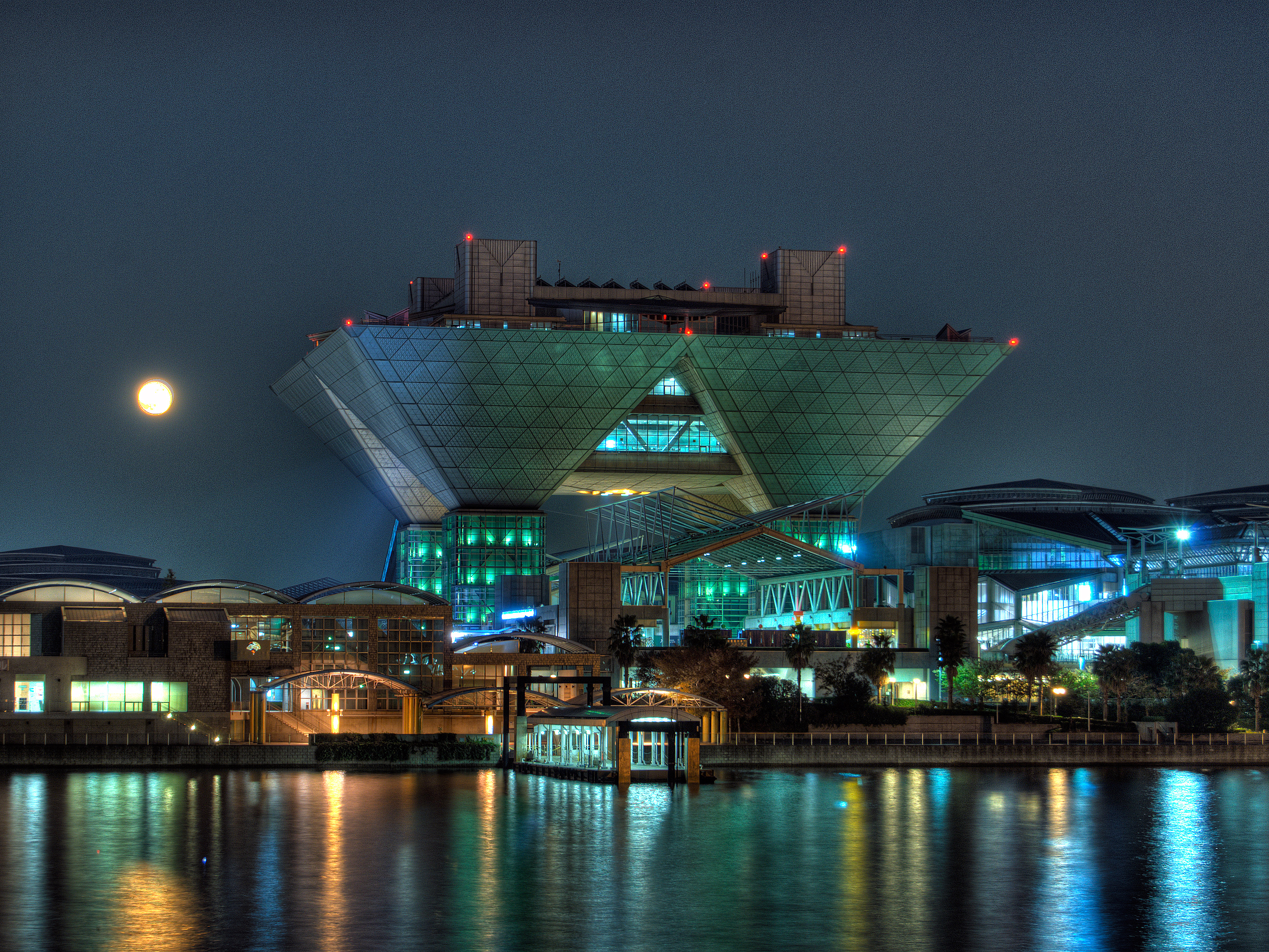
Tokyo Big Sight at night

Located on the shore of Tokyo Bay, about 30 minutes by rail from Tokyo Station (12 minutes by car), Big Sight is Japan's largest international convention venue. Its most distinctive feature is the unique architecture of its 58 metres (190 ft) high eight-storey Conference Tower. The site utilizes steel frame with reinforced concrete construction, boasting a total floor area of 230,873 square metres (2,485,100 sq ft) which outsizes Makuhari Messe's floor space by half, and of which 35% is indoors. The convention center is divided into three main areas, each with their own restaurants and other supporting facilities: The East Exhibition Hall, the West Exhibition Hall and the Conference Tower.

=== Conference Tower ===
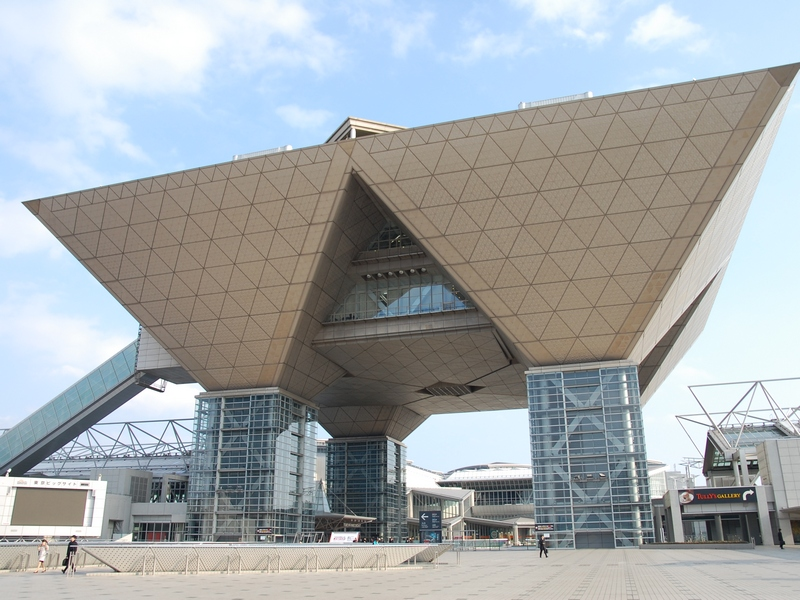
As seen from the ground

The architectural element most associated with the Tokyo Big Sight name, the glass and titanium-panelled Conference Tower appears as a set of four inverted pyramids mounted upon large supports. The first floor comprises an 1,100-seat reception hall and four conference rooms of varying size. The second floor comprises the Entrance Plaza which is the main access area, the glass-roofed Event Plaza, the Entrance Hall which leads to the exhibition halls proper, and the Exhibition Plaza. There are no floors three through five due to the structure's above-ground stature.

Floors six and seven can be directly accessed via escalator from the second-floor Entrance Hall, and comprise the main convention facilities of the Tower. The sixth floor houses ten conference rooms of small to medium size, some of which can be merged into larger spaces by removing intervening partitions. Floor seven houses the 1,000-seat International Conference Room as well as three conference rooms of much smaller size. Floor eight houses five conference rooms.

Scattered around the Tower's vicinity are public art pieces, most of which are works by international artists such as Claes Oldenburg and his wife Coosje Van Bruggen, Michael Craig-Martin and Lee U-Fan. These include a giant sculpture of a saw, a large stylized pond and three marble beds.

=== East Exhibition Hall ===
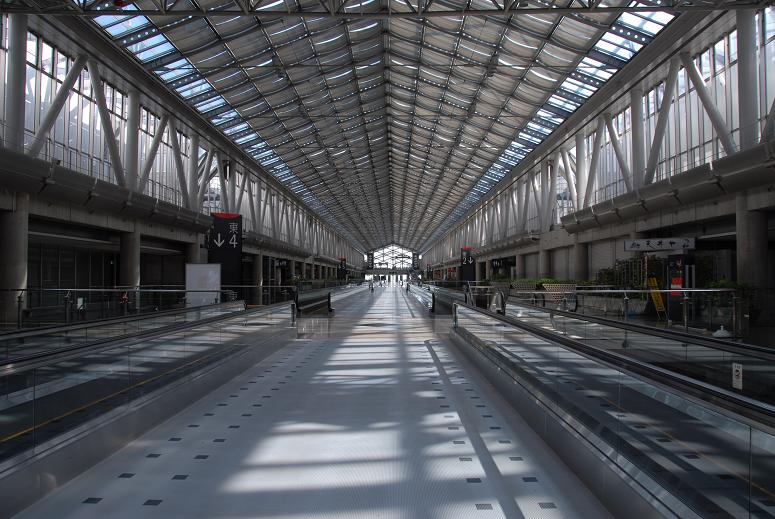
The central Galleria

The East Exhibition Hall's main layout consists of a central 600 metres (2,000 ft) long two-tiered galleria, flanked on both sides by three mostly identical exhibition halls, and has underground parking available. The overall height of the structure is three storeys, with the galleria reaching two storeys. The glass-roofed galleria is equipped with moving walkways for easier movement, food outlets, escalators, electronic signboards and a host of other relevant facilities.

Each hall has a mobile roof that enables exhibitors to control the amount of sunlight coming through, recessed electronic and control service pits at regular intervals (6 metres (20 ft)), a show office, four meeting rooms and a dressing room. It is possible to merge a hall with adjacent halls on the same side, allowing for a maximum continuous floor space three times the capacity of a single hall, or a grand total of 26,010 square metres (280,000 sq ft).

Unlike its West counterpart, the East Exhibition Hall is not located next to the main Conference Tower area.

=== West Exhibition Hall ===
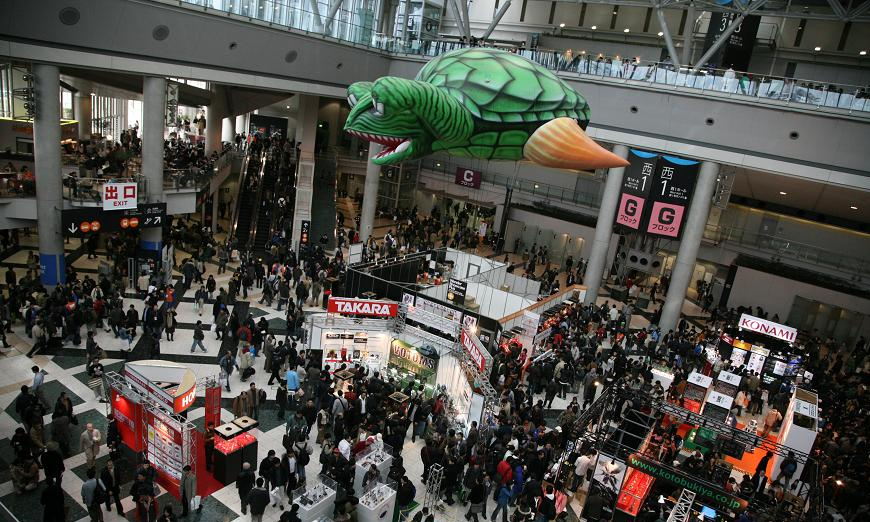
The Atrium on a busy day

The West Exhibition Hall's layout consists of four internal halls surrounding a central two-tiered Atrium. Halls one and two occupy the first floor, and are each equipped with a single meeting room, two show offices and seven meeting rooms. If necessary, they can be merged with the glass-roofed atrium area to maximize all available exhibition space. Halls three and four are individually smaller than the first floor halls, as the rest of the space not taken up by the Atrium's upper area is largely the rooftop exhibition area.

Adjacent to the West Exhibition Hall is an outdoor exhibition area, which like the rooftop area overlooks the waterfront. Like the other exhibition areas in the Tokyo Big Sight, it is possible to combine both upper halls and both spaces together to create a single continuous floor area. All in all, the West Exhibition Hall boasts in total six show offices, twenty-three meeting rooms and three dressing rooms. The gross total floor area of the Hall stands at 46,280 square metres (498,200 sq ft).

== Construction ==
Contracted by the Tokyo Metropolitan Government's Bureau of Finance, the construction of the entire site was handled by eight contractors in total, among them companies such as the Hazama and Shimizu Corporations. Construction began in October 1992 and was finished in October 1995. The total contract was worth ¥40,392 million. Forty-five percent of that sum went to Hazama, the sole contractor of the Tower segment.

Then Governor of Tokyo Shunichi Suzuki was present at the 1994 lifting-up ceremony on June 30, which initiated the raising the Tower's 6,500 short tons (5,900 t) main structure above ground, a process which took three days to complete using a computer-guided system that precisely jacked the structure up into place. A 250-ton aerial escalator was installed later to formally link the raised structure to the ground floors.

== See also ==
- Intex Osaka
- Tourism in Tokyo
