= Intex Osaka =

Convention center in the city of Osaka, Japan

INTEX Osaka
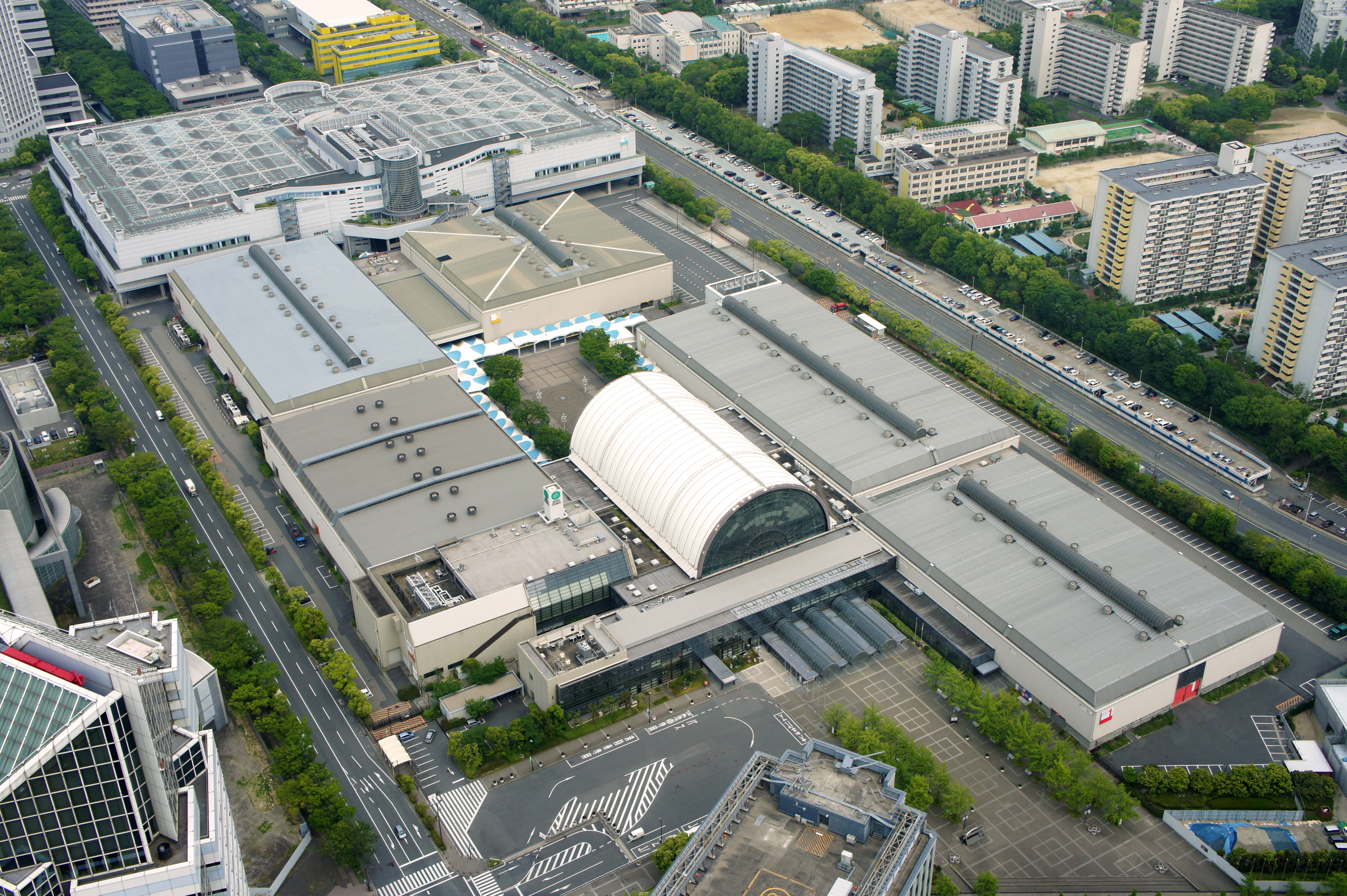
- Intex Osaka
- Interactive map of INTEX Osaka
- Address: 1-5-102, Nanko-Kita,
- Location: Suminoe-ku, Osaka, Osaka, Japan
- Coordinates: 34°38′14″N 135°25′5″E
- Owner: City of Osaka
- Operator: Osaka International Business Promotion Center
- Public transit: Nakafutō Station

Construction
- Built: 23 December 1983 – 31 March 1985
- Opened: May 1, 1985; 40 years ago
- Expanded: October 1993; 32 years ago (Hall 6)
- Construction cost: ¥17.6 billion (¥22.8 billion in 2024 yen)

Website
- www.intex-osaka.com/en/

INTEX Osaka (インテックス大阪, Intekkusu Ōsaka), officially known as International Exhibition Center, Osaka (大阪国際見本市会場, Ōsaka kokusai mihon-ichi kaijō), is a convention and exhibition center in Suminoe-ku, Osaka, Osaka Prefecture, Japan. The center is located on the Business Creation and Information Transmission Zone of Cosmosquare District in Sakishima Island, a planned business exchange and trading district in Osaka Bay area.

With 72,978 square meters of exhibition area, the venue ranks third in the nation, behind Tokyo Big Sight and Makuhari Messe in terms of total exhibition space. The abbreviation "INTEX" stands for "INTernational EXhibition center."

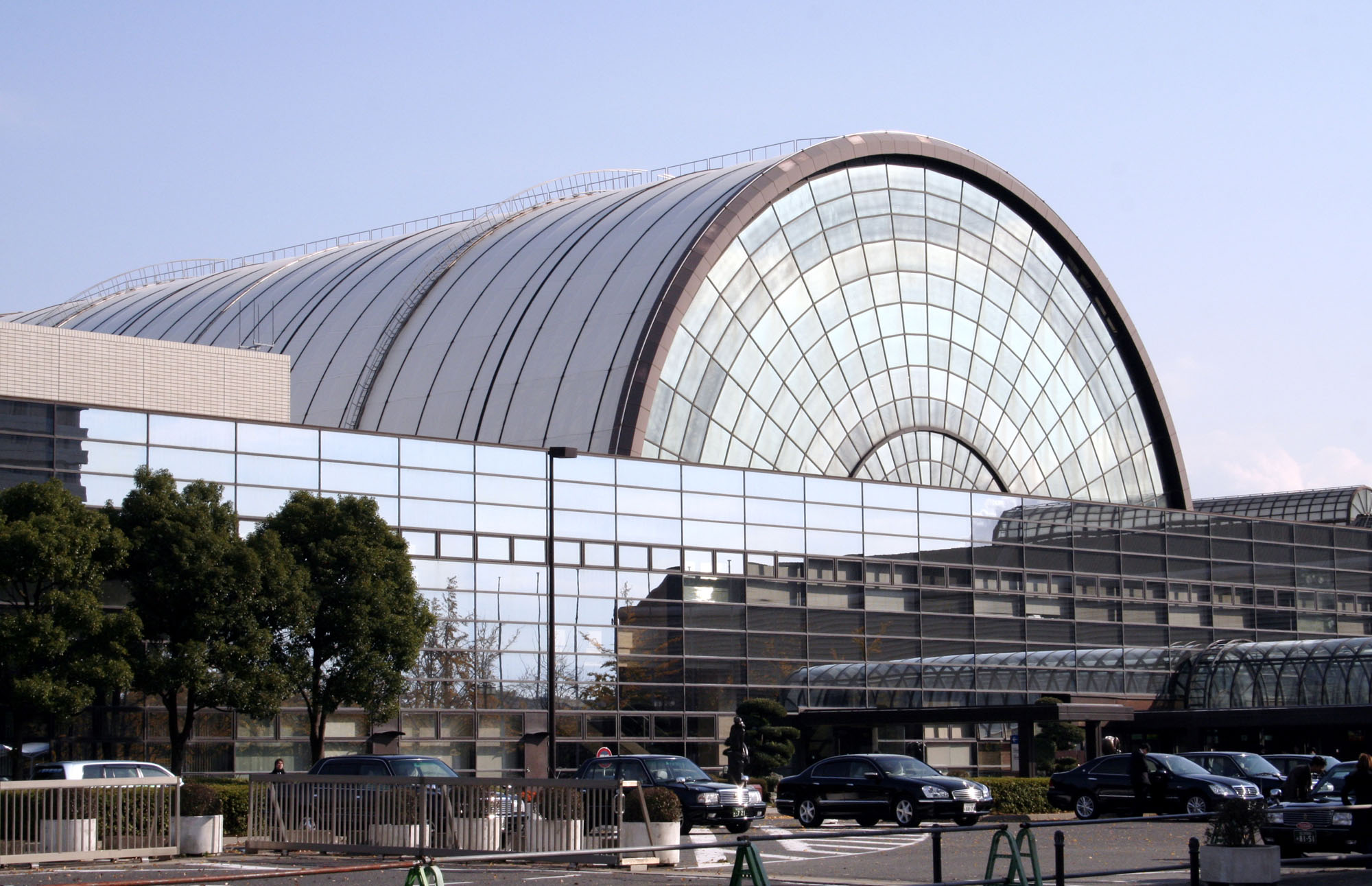
The entrance to Intex Osaka

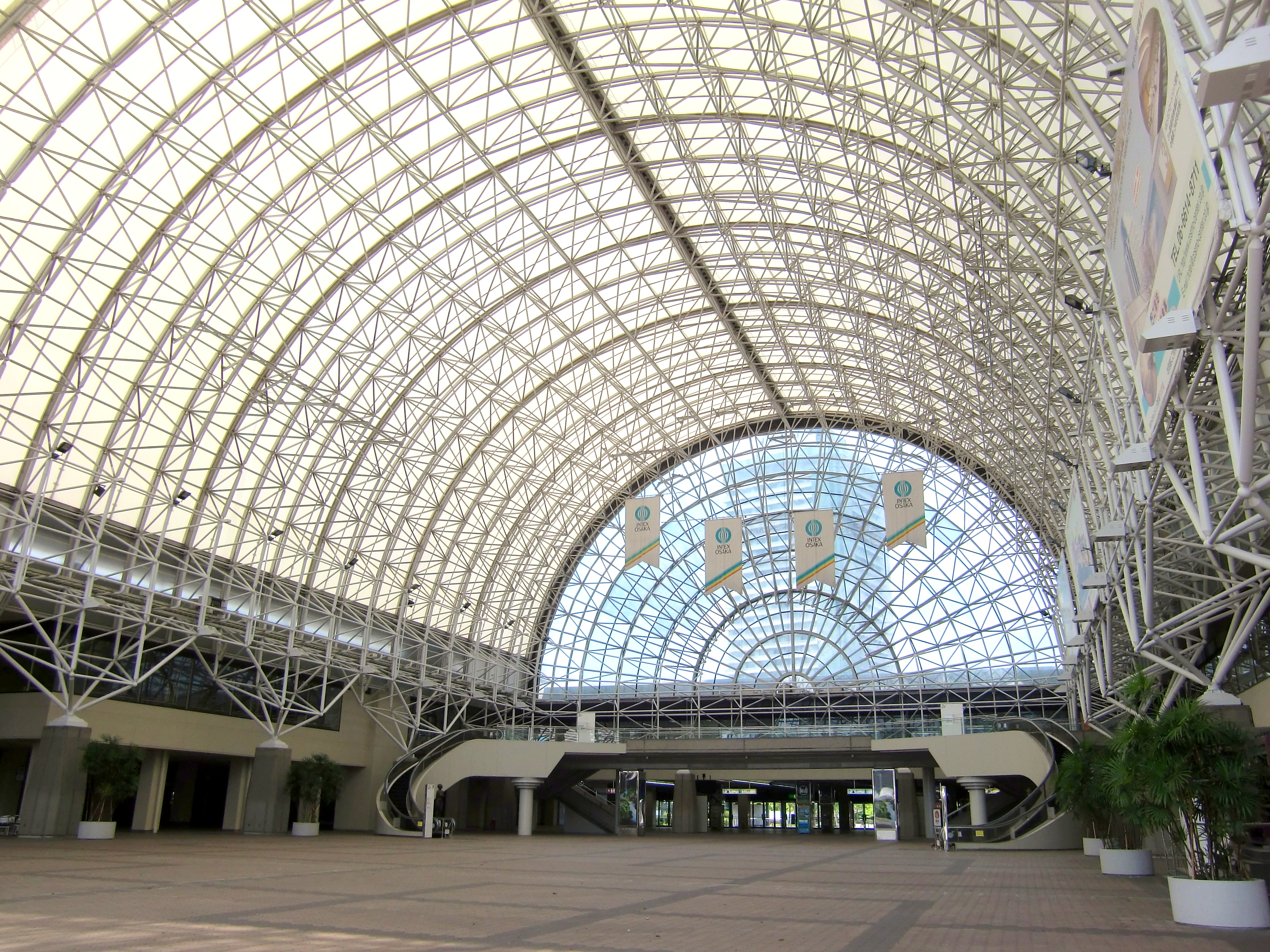
Intex Plaza

== Principal events ==
- Osaka Auto Messe
- Osaka Motor Show – Held around December every other year in odd years
- Pokémon Festa
- Dōjinshi Sokubaikai
- Magical Mirai - Annual Vocaloid Concert
- Sibos 2012 – Held on October 29 – November 1, 2012
- 2019 G20 Osaka Summit – Held on June 28–29, 2019
