= Minami-Tama Station =

Railway station in Inagi, Tokyo, Japan

JN19 Minami-Tama Station 南多摩駅
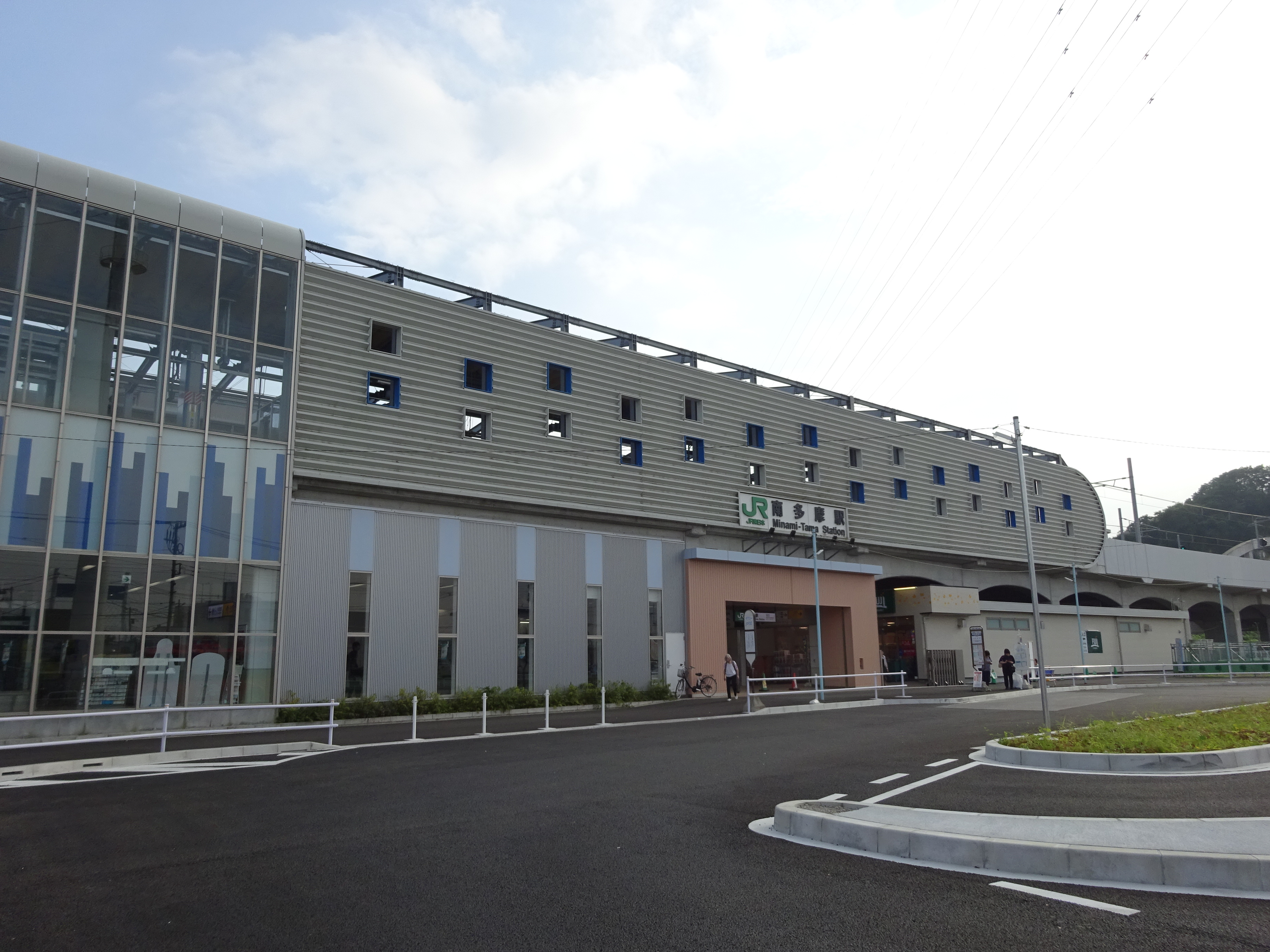
- Minami-Tama Station, 2016

General information
- Location: Daimaru 1043, Inagi-shi, Tokyo 206-0801; Japan
- Coordinates: 35°38′57.26″N 139°29′22.51″E
- Operator: JR East
- Line: Nambu Line
- Distance: 25.5 km from Kawasaki
- Platforms: 1 island platform
- Connections: Bus stop

Other information
- Status: Staffed
- Website: Official website

History
- Opened: 1 November 1927

Passengers
- FY2019: 6,814

Services
Preceding station	JR East	Following station
Fuchū-Hommachi JN20 towards Tachikawa	Nambu Line Local	Inagi-Naganuma JN18 towards Kawasaki
Location
- Location within Tokyo Location within Japan

Minami-Tama Station (南多摩駅, Minami-Tama-eki) is a passenger railway station located in the city of Inagi, Tokyo, Japan, operated by East Japan Railway Company (JR East).

== Lines ==
Minami-Tama Station is served by the Nambu Line, and is situated 25.5 km from the terminus of the line at Kawasaki Station.

== Station layout ==
The station consists of one elevated island platform, with the station building located underneath. The station is staffed.

=== Platforms ===
1	Nambu Line	for Fuchūhommachi, Nishi-Kunitachi, and Tachikawa
2	Nambu Line	for Noborito, Musashi-Kosugi, and Kawasaki

== History ==
The station opened on 1 November 1927. With the privatization of JNR on 1 April 1987, the station came under the control of JR East.

== Passenger statistics ==
In fiscal 2019, the station was used by an average of 6,814 passengers daily (boarding passengers only).

The passenger figures for previous years are as shown below.

Fiscal year	Daily average
2005	5,836
2010	6,274
2015	6,831

== Surrounding area ==
- Suntory Products Tamagawa Plant
- Nippon Filcon (Headquarters / Tokyo Office)
- Inagi Municipal Hospital
- Inagi City Central Library

== See also ==
- List of railway stations in Japan
