= 新城駅 =

新城駅 or 新城驛 may refer to:

Written as 新城駅

- Shinjō Station (disambiguation)
  - Musashi-Shinjō Station
  - Tsugaru-Shinjō Station
- Shinshiro Station

Written as 新城驛

- Sinseong Station, on Janghang Line, South Korea
- Sinsŏng Station, on Sinsong Line, North Korea
