= Todoroki Ryokuchi =

Park in Japan

Coordinates: 35°35′10″N 139°39′00″E

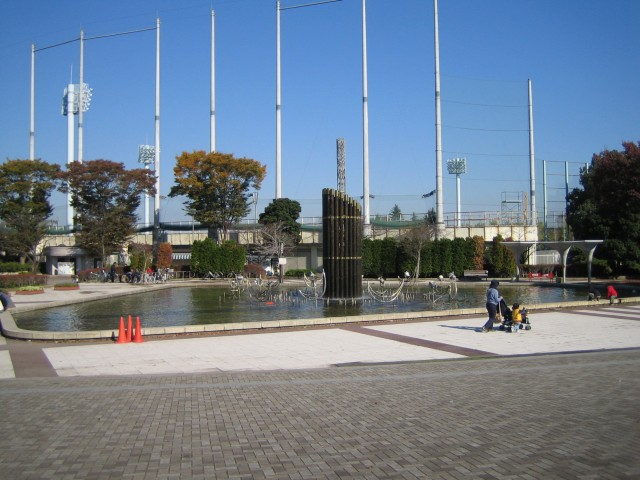
The fountain at Todoroki Green Space (re-uploaded) - Photographed on November 22, 2004.

Todoroki Ryokuchi (等々力緑地) is a park located in Nakahara-ku ward, Kawasaki, in Kanagawa Prefecture, Japan. It is famous for its sport facilities including an athletics stadium, gym, a baseball field, a pool, a tennis court, and it contains a museum as well.

== Main facilities ==
- Todoroki Athletics Stadium, the home stadium of Kawasaki Frontale
- Todoroki Arena
- Kawasaki City Museum

== Access ==
- The park is located approximately 20 minutes walk from Musashi-Nakahara Station on the Nambu Line.
- A bus from Musashi-Kosugi Station that stops at the park is available.
