= Uvance Todoroki Stadium by Fujitsu =

Sports stadium in Kawasaki, Japan

Todoroki Athletics Stadium
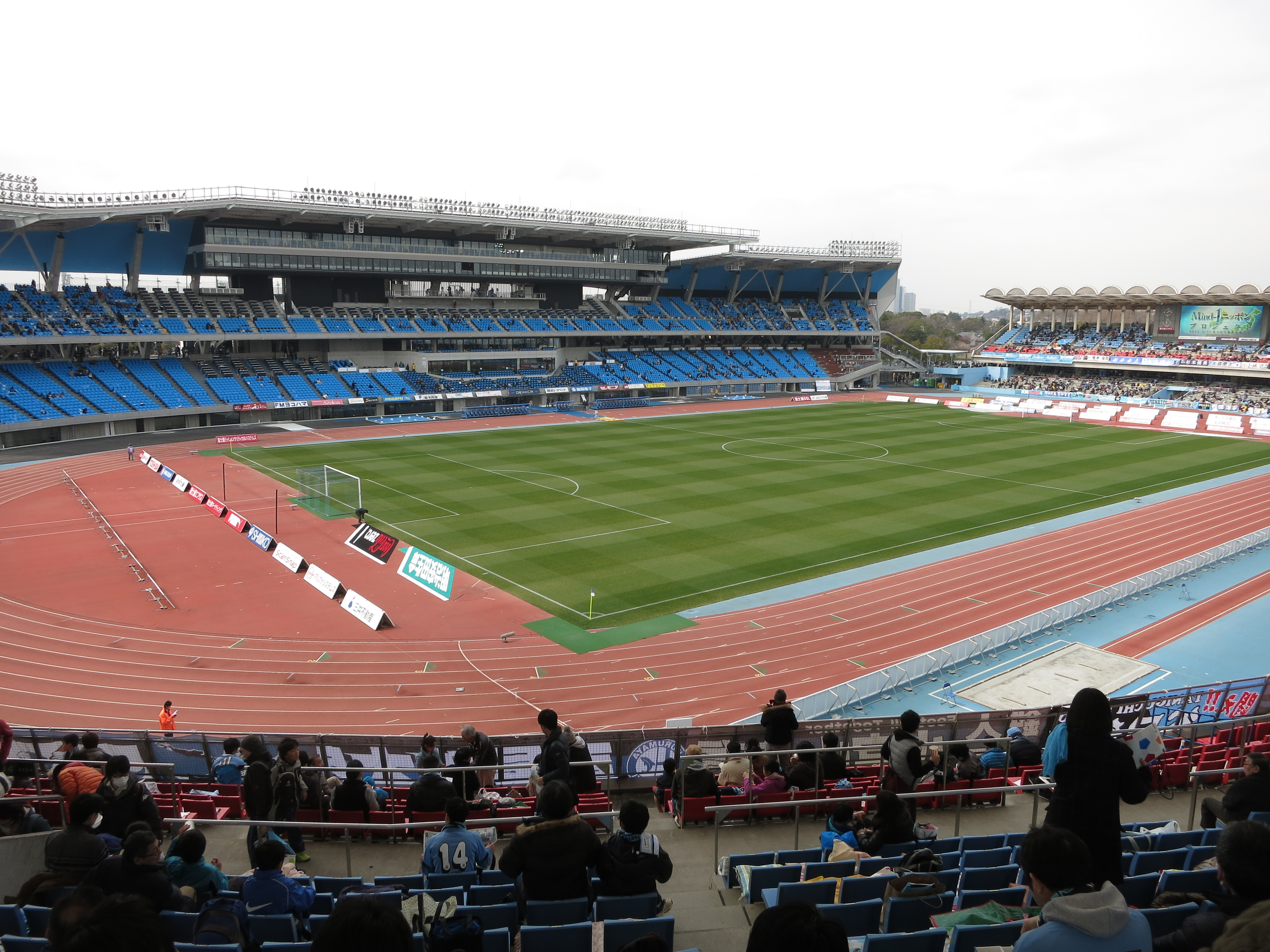
- Interactive map of Todoroki Athletics Stadium
- Former names: Todoroki Athletics Stadium (1962–2024)
- Location: Kawasaki, Kanagawa Prefecture, Japan
- Coordinates: 35°35′09″N 139°39′10″E
- Owner: Kawasaki City
- Capacity: 26,232
- Surface: Grass
- Public transit: JR East: Nambu Line at Musashi-Nakahara

Construction
- Opened: 1962
- Expanded: 1995, 2015

Tenant
- Kawasaki Frontale

The Uvance Todoroki Stadium by Fujitsu (Uvanceとどろきスタジアム by Fujitsu, Yuvensu Todoroki Sutajiamu bai Fujitsu), officially Todoroki Athletics Stadium, a.k.a. formerly the Kawasaki Todoroki Stadium, is a multi-purpose stadium located in Todoroki Ryokuchi in Kawasaki, Kanagawa Prefecture, Japan. It is currently used mostly for football matches and is the home stadium of Kawasaki Frontale. Fujitsu signed a naming rights agreement with the stadium, adopting its new name on 1 February 2024, with the contract running to 31 March 2029.

Until the early 2000s, the stadium also hosted major clubs in the city, such as Verdy Kawasaki (Tokyo Verdy), Toshiba (Consadole Sapporo) and NKK S.C. The stadium has also played host to multiple IAAF competitions, most recently in 2017, and to the British Olympic Association's Pre-Games Training Camp in the lead up to the 2020 Tokyo Olympic and Paralympic Games.

The stadium holds 26,232 people and was built in 1962. The stadium hosted the 2007 IFAF World Championship Opening Match and Final. The closest train station is Musashi-Nakahara on the Nambu line. There are bus routes to this station and special services on game days.

Kawasaki Todoroki Park, which was established with the joint investment of 9 companies including Fujitsu, has been operating and maintaining the facilities and the green spaces of the Todoroki Ryokuchi Park since April 2023 as part of the Todoroki Ryokuchi Park redevelopment and operation project.
