= Tsudayama Station =

Railway station in Kawasaki, Kanagawa Prefecture, Japan

JN11 Tsudayama Station 津田山駅
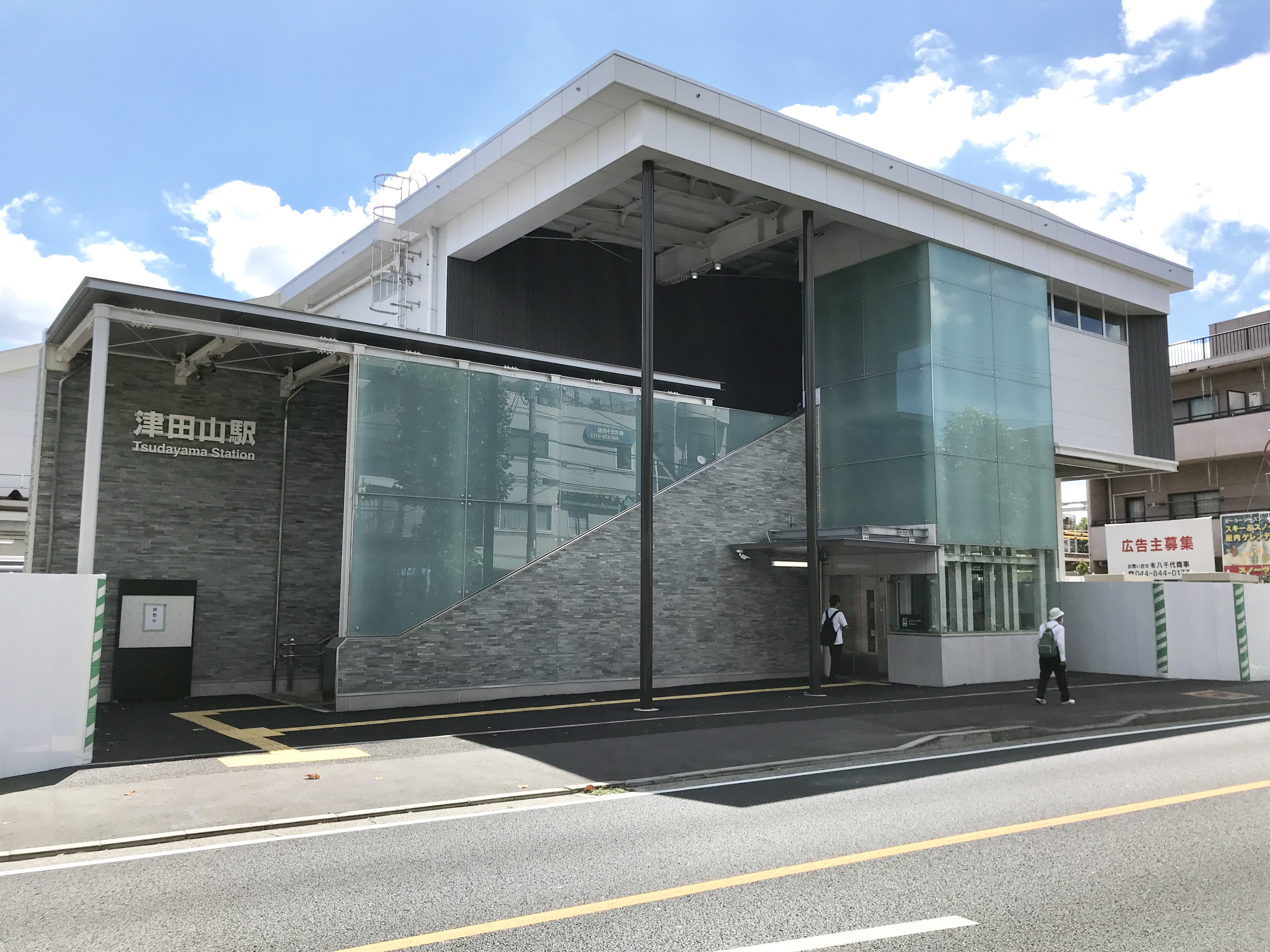
- Tsudayama Station, August 2019

General information
- Location: Shimo-Sakunobe 1357, Takatsu-ku, Kawasaki-shim Kanagawa-ken 213-0033; Japan
- Coordinates: 35.604129°N 139.600015°E
- Operator: JR East
- Line: Nambu Line
- Distance: 13.9 km from Kawasaki
- Platforms: 1 island platform
- Tracks: 2

Other information
- Station code: JN11
- Website: Official website

History
- Opened: 9 April 1943
- Former names: Nihon Hume Kan Mae (until 1944)

Passengers
- FY2019: 3,820 daily

Services
Preceding station	JR East	Following station
Kuji JN12 towards Tachikawa	Nambu Line Local	Musashi-Mizonokuchi JN10 towards Kawasaki
Location
- Location within Kanagawa Prefecture Location within Japan

Tsudayama Station (津田山駅, Tsudayama-eki) is a passenger railway station located in Takatsu-ku, Kawasaki, Kanagawa Prefecture, Japan, operated by the East Japan Railway Company (JR East).

== Lines ==
Tsudayama Station is served by the Nambu Line. The station is 13.9 km the southern terminus of the line at Kawasaki Station.

== Station layout ==
The station consists of a single island platform serving two tracks, connected to the station building by a footbridge. The station is staffed.

=== Platforms ===
1	Nambu Line	for Musashi-Mizonokuchi, Musashi-Kosugi, and Kawasaki
2	Nambu Line	for Noborito, Fuchū-Hommachi, Bubaigawara, and Tachikawa

== History ==
Tsudayama Station opened as Nihon Hume Tube Mae Stop (日本ヒューム管前停留場, Nihon Hume Kan Mae Teishajo) on the Nambu Railway on 5 February 1941. The stop was raised in status to that of a full station on 9 April 1943. Along with nationalization of Nambu Railway, the station became Tsudayama Station of Japanese Government Railway Nambu Line on 1 April 1944, and part of the Japan National Railways (JNR) from 1949. All freight services were discontinued from 5 March 1972. Along with privatization and division of JNR, JR East started operating the station on 1 April 1987.

== Passenger statistics ==
In fiscal 2019, the station was used by an average of 3,820 passengers daily (boarding passengers only).

The passenger figures (boarding passengers only) for previous years are as shown below.

Fiscal year	daily average
2005	3,572
2010	3,611
2015	3,786

== Surrounding area ==
- Kawasaki Municipal Midorigaoka Cemetery
- Kawasaki City Shimosakunobe Elementary School

== See also ==
- List of railway stations in Japan
