= Musashi-Nakahara Station =

Railway station in Kawasaki, Kanagawa Prefecture, Japan

JN08 Musashi-Nakahara Station 武蔵中原駅
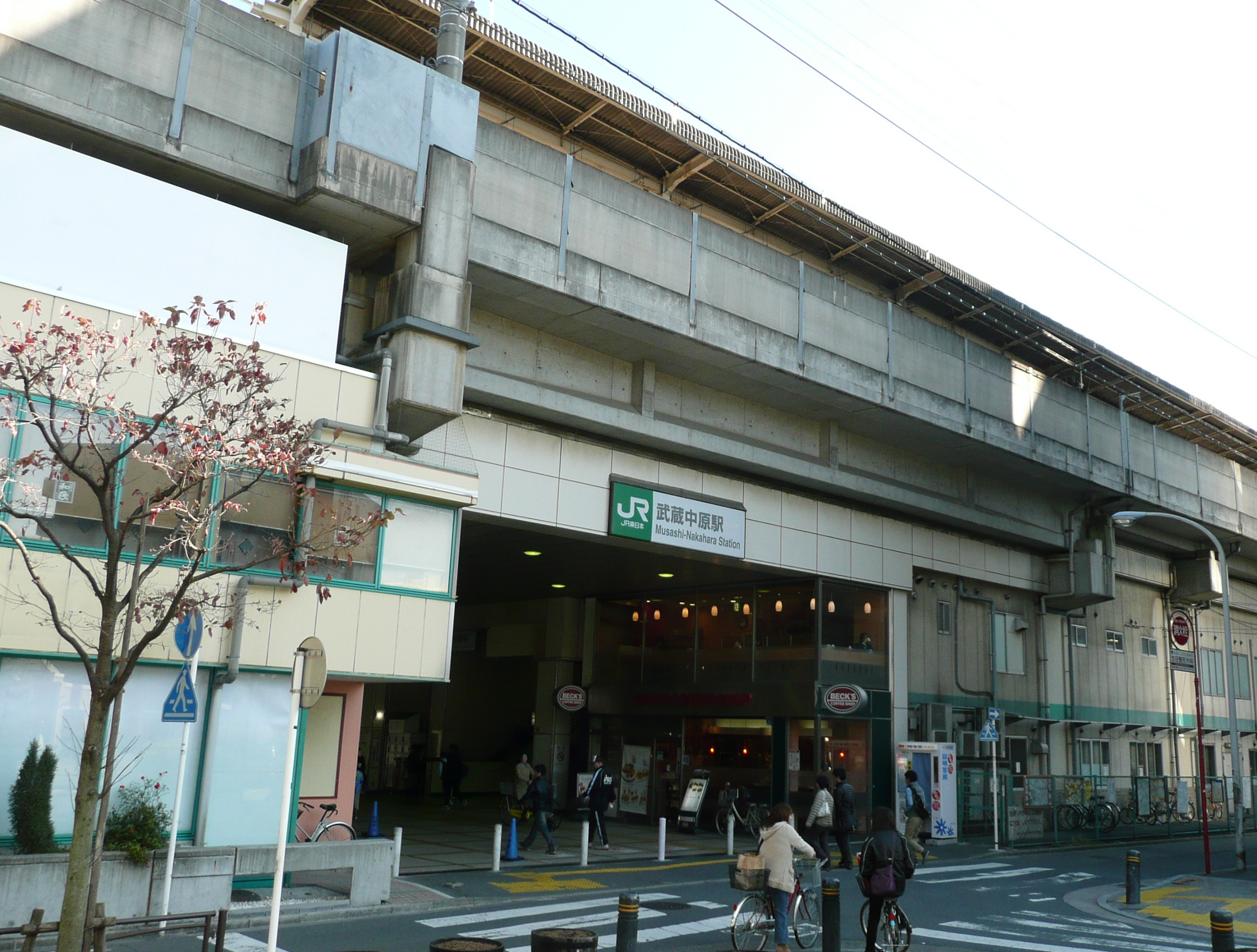
- Musashi-Nakahara Station, November 2011

General information
- Location: 6 Kami-Kodanaka, Nakahara-ku, Kawasaki-shi, Kanagawa-ken 211-0053; Japan
- Coordinates: 35.5816°N 139.6401°E
- Operator: JR East
- Line: Nambu Line
- Distance: 9.2 km from Kawasaki
- Platforms: 2 island platforms
- Connections: Bus terminal

Other information
- Status: Staffed (Midori no Madoguchi)
- Station code: JN08
- Website: Official website

History
- Opened: March 9, 1927

Passengers
- FY2019: 34,198 daily

Services
Preceding station	JR East	Following station
Musashi-Shinjō JN09 towards Tachikawa	Nambu Line Rapid Local	Musashi-Kosugi towards Kawasaki
Location
- Location within Kanagawa Prefecture Location within Japan

Musashi-Nakahara Station (武蔵中原駅, Musashi-Nakahara-eki) is a passenger railway station located in Nakahara-ku, Kawasaki, Kanagawa Prefecture, Japan, operated by the East Japan Railway Company (JR East).

== Lines ==
Musashi-Nakahara Station is served by the Nambu Line. The station is 9.2 km (5.7 mi) from the southern terminus of the line at Kawasaki Station.

== Station layout ==
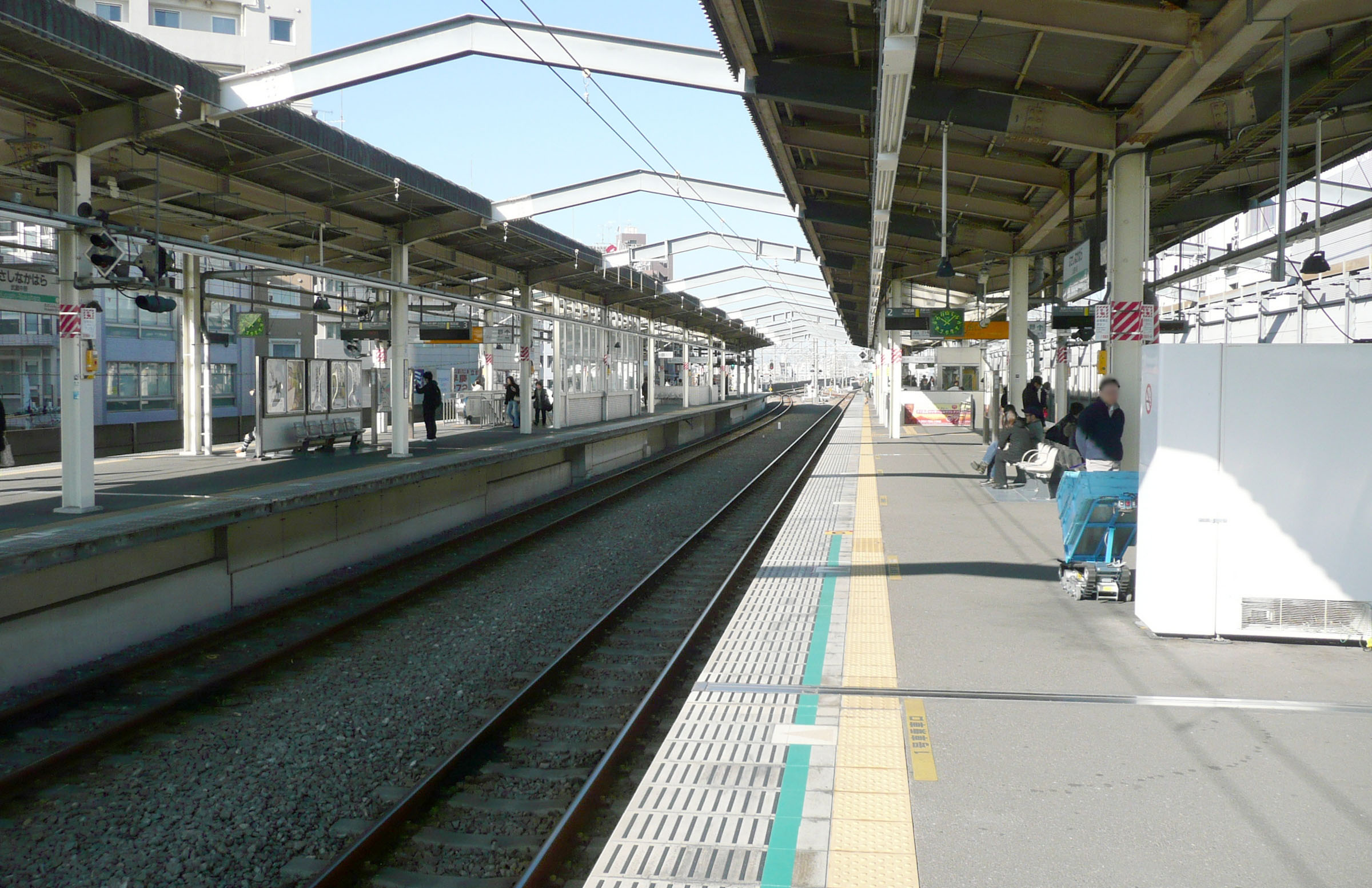
View of the platforms, November 2011

The station is staffed and consists of two island platforms serving four tracks. Platforms 2 and 3 are used for trains starting from Musashi-Nakahara, as their tracks in the opposite direction lead to Nakahara Depot. The station has a Midori no Madoguchi staffed ticket office an automatic ticket gates.

=== Platforms ===
1,2	Nambu Line	for Musashi-Kosugi, Yakō, and Kawasaki
3,4	Nambu Line	for Musashi-Mizonokuchi, Noborito, and Tachikawa

== History ==
Musashi-Nakahara Station opened as a station on the Nambu Railway on 9 March 1927. The Nambu Railway was nationalized on 1 April 1944, becoming part of the Japanese Government Railway (JGR) system, which became the Japanese National Railways (JNR) from 1946. Freight operations were discontinued from January 16, 1961. Along with privatization and division of JNR, JR East started operating the station on 1 April 1987. The station was rebuilt in 1990, with the platforms being elevated and moved 200 meters towards Musashi-Kosugi Station.

== Passenger statistics ==
In fiscal 2019, the station was used by an average of 34,198 passengers daily (boarding passengers only).

The passenger figures (boarding passengers only) for previous years are as shown below.

Fiscal year	daily average
2005	30,416
2010	32,613
2015	34,563

== Surrounding area ==
- Fujitsu Kawasaki Factory (Registered Head Office)
- Todoroki Athletics Stadium (J League Kawasaki Frontale home stadium)
- Kawasaki City Museum
- Kanagawa Prefectural Shinjo High School
- Kawasaki City Oto Elementary School
- Kawasaki City Nishinakahara Junior High School

== See also ==
- List of railway stations in Japan
