= Kawasaki City Tram =

Tram Line in Kawasaki

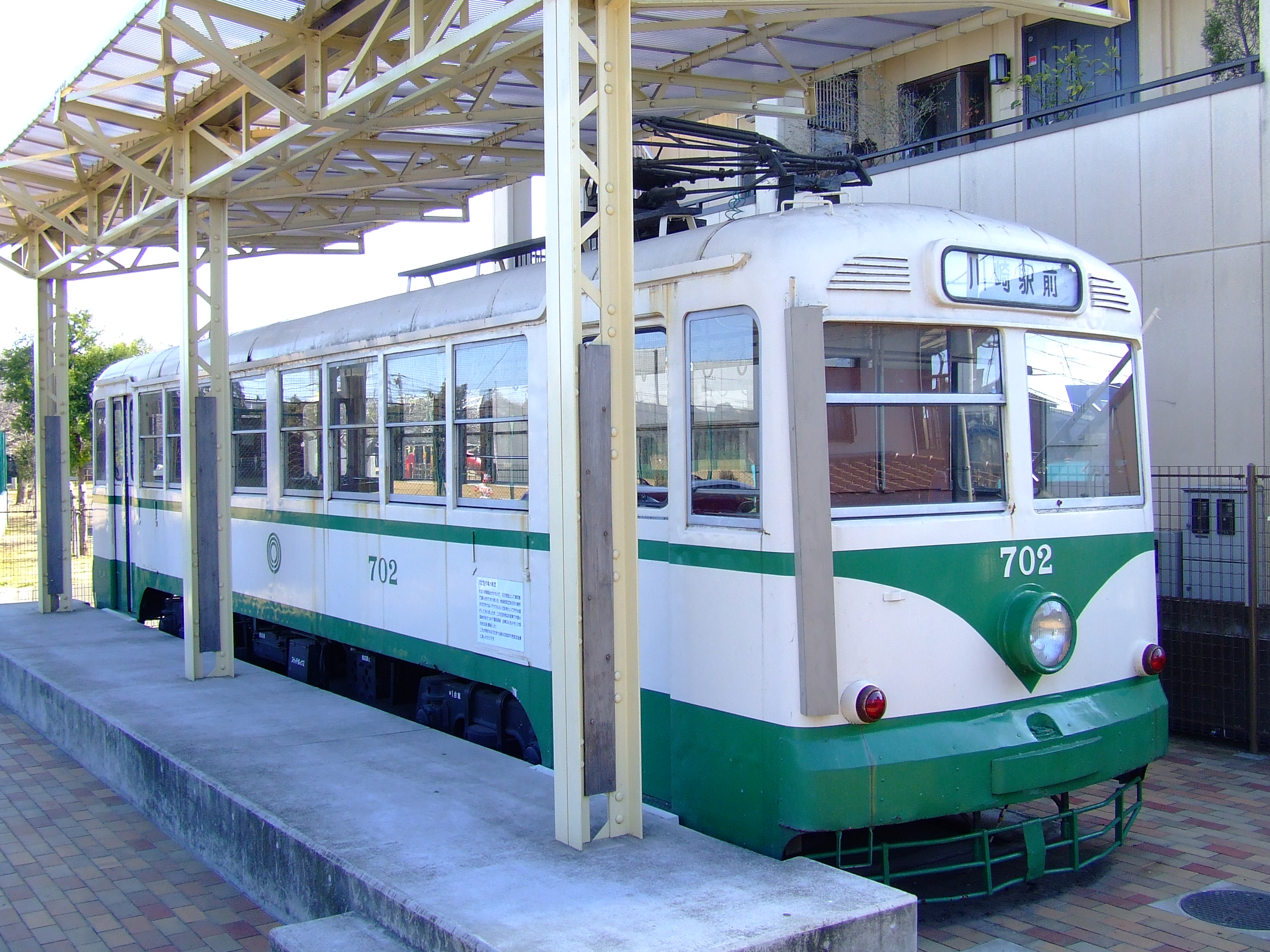
Preserved former Kawasaki City tramcar number 702

Kawasaki City Tram (川崎市電, Kawasaki Shiden) was a tram line in the Japanese city of Kawasaki, Kanagawa Prefecture. The 6.7 km line ran from Shiden Kawasaki (in front of Kawasaki Station) to Shiohama Station (now closed). The tramway operated from 1944 to 1969. A street on the former route is named Shiden Dori (市電通り, lit. "Tramway Street").
