= Musashi-Shinjō Station =

Railway station in Kawasaki, Kanagawa Prefecture, Japan

JN09 Musashi-Shinjō Station 武蔵新城駅
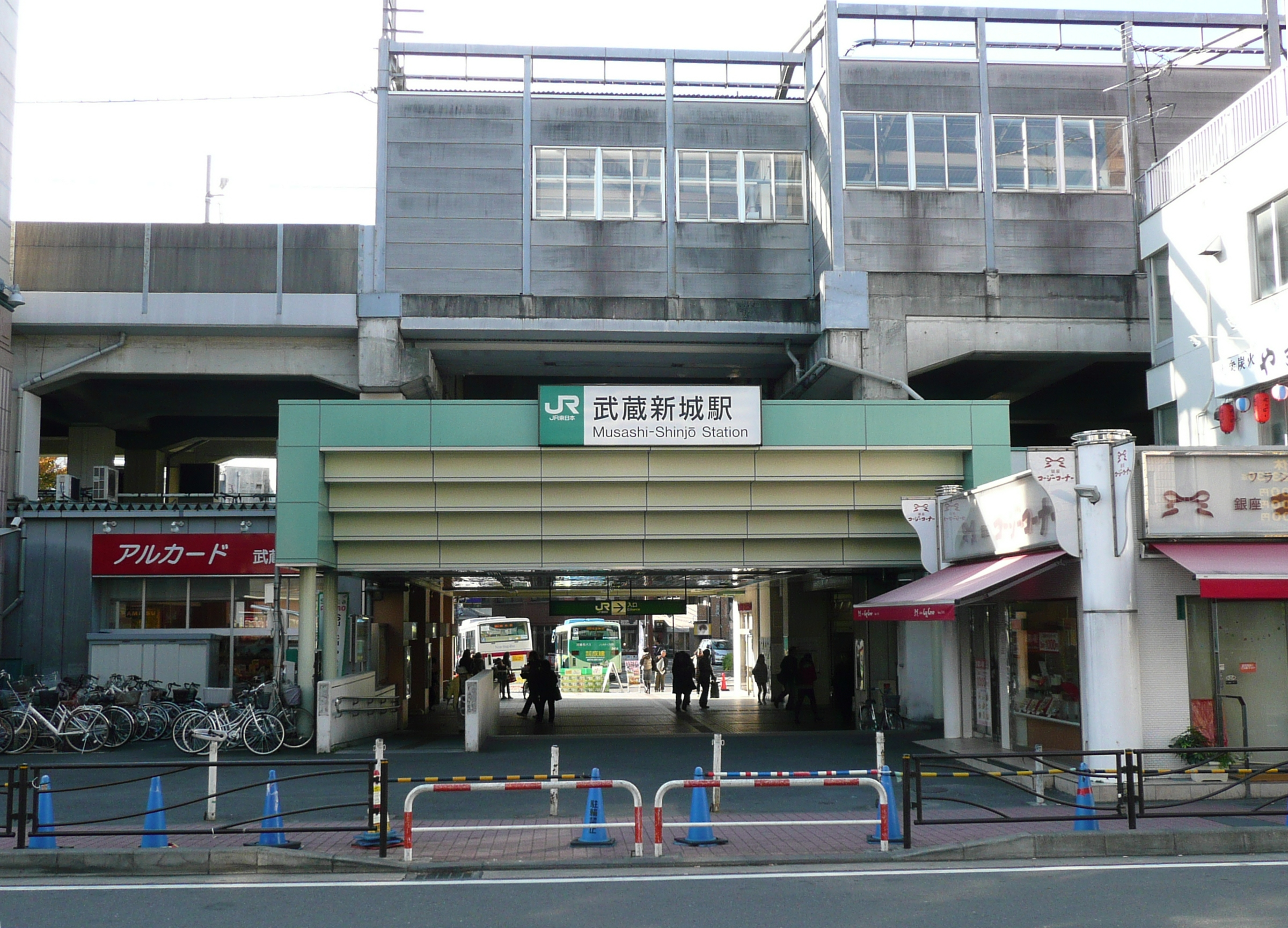
- Musashi-Shinjō Station North Exit

General information
- Location: Kami-Shinjō 2-11-1, Nakahara-ku, Kawasaki-shi, Kawasaki, Kanagawa-ken 211-0044; Japan
- Coordinates: 35.5875°N 139.6291°E
- Operator: JR East
- Line: Nambu Line
- Distance: 10.5 km from Kawasaki
- Platforms: 1 island
- Connections: Bus stop

Other information
- Station code: JN09
- Website: Official website

History
- Opened: 1 April 1944

Passengers
- 2019: 37,642 daily

Services
Preceding station	JR East	Following station
Musashi-Mizonokuchi JN10 towards Tachikawa	Nambu Line Rapid Local	Musashi-Nakahara JN08 towards Kawasaki
Location
- Location within Kanagawa Prefecture Location within Japan

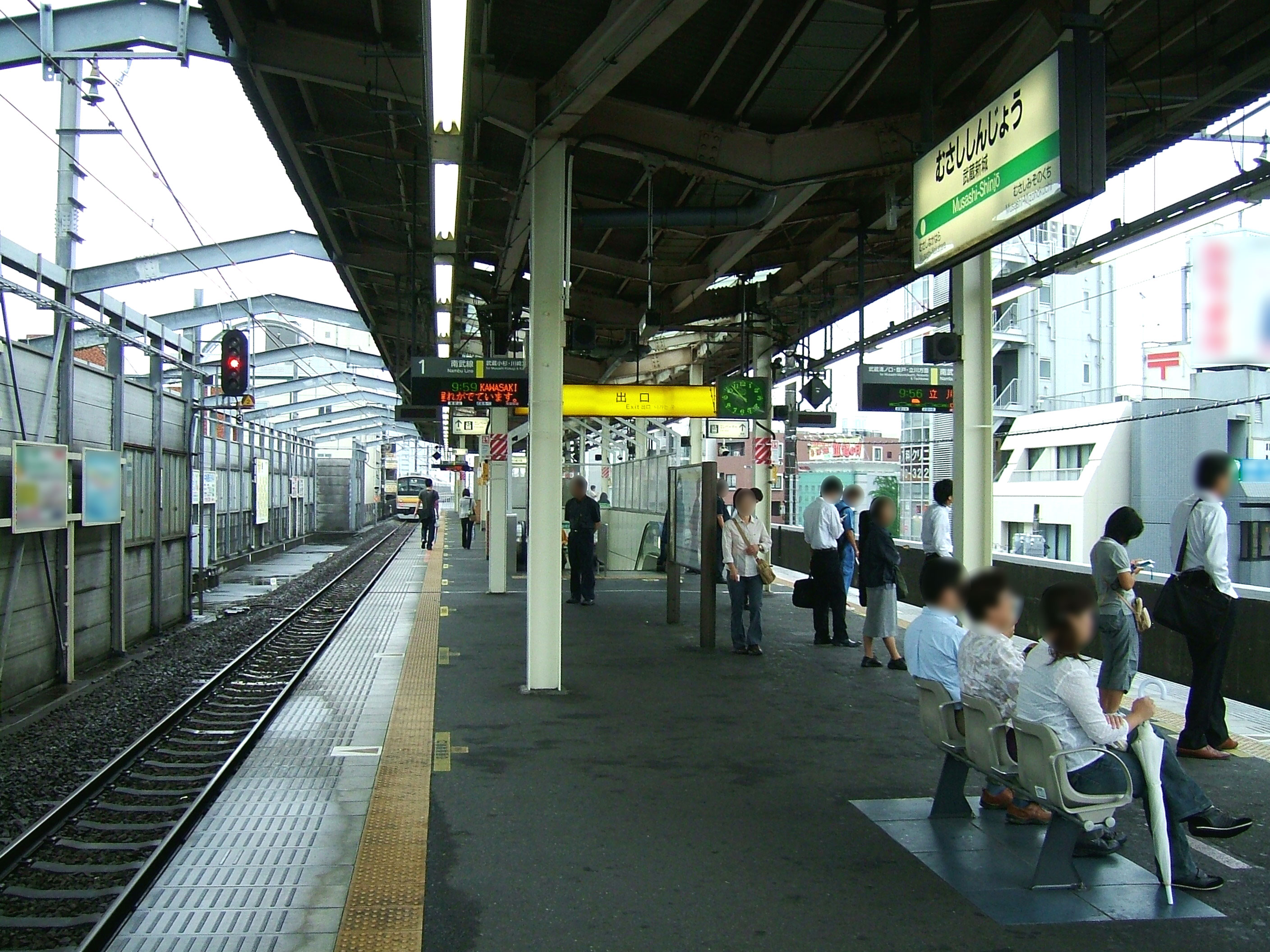
Platform

Musashi-Shinjō Station (武蔵新城駅, Musashi-Shinjō-eki) is a passenger railway station located in Nakahara-ku, Kawasaki, Kanagawa Prefecture, Japan, operated by the East Japan Railway Company (JR East).

== Lines ==
Musashi-Shinjō Station is served by the Nambu Line. The station is 10.5 km (6.5 mi) the southern terminus of the line at Kawasaki Station.

== Station layout ==
The station consists of a single elevated island platform serving two tracks with the station building underneath. The station is attended.

=== Platforms ===
1	Nambu Line	for Musashi-Kosugi and Kawasaki
2	Nambu Line	for Musashi-Mizonokuchi, Noborito, Fuchū-Hommachi, and Tachikawa

== History ==
Musashi-Shinjō Station opened as Musashi-Shinjō Stop (武蔵新城停車場, Musashi-Shinjō-Teishajo) on the Nambu Railway on 11 August 1927. The stop was raised in status to that of a full station on 1 April 1944 with the nationalization of Nambu Railway, into the Japanese Government Railway (JGR) Nambu Line system. The JGR became the Japan National Railways (JNR) from 1946. Along with privatization and division of JNR, JR East started operating the station on 1 April 1987. The tracks were elevated and the station rebuilt in 1990.

== Passenger statistics ==
In fiscal 2019, the station was used by an average of 37,642 passengers daily (boarding passengers only).

The passenger figures (boarding passengers only) for previous years are as shown below.

Fiscal year	daily average
2005	28,679
2010	31,620
2015	35,325

== Surrounding area ==
- Fujitsu Headquarters
- Aimoru Shopping Street
- Shinshiro Sun Mall Shopping Street (Nikko Shopping Street)
- Shinjo Nishidori Shopping Street
- Aiseikai Keihin General Hospital
- Kanagawa Prefectural Shinjo High School

== See also ==
- List of railway stations in Japan
