= Shinjō Station (disambiguation) =

Shinjō Station is the name of three train stations in Japan:

- Shinjō Station
- Musashi-Shinjō Station
- Tsugaru-Shinjō Station
