= Musashi-Mizonokuchi Station =

Railway station in Kawasaki, Kanagawa Prefecture, Japan

JN10 Musashi-Mizonokuchi Station 武蔵溝ノ口駅
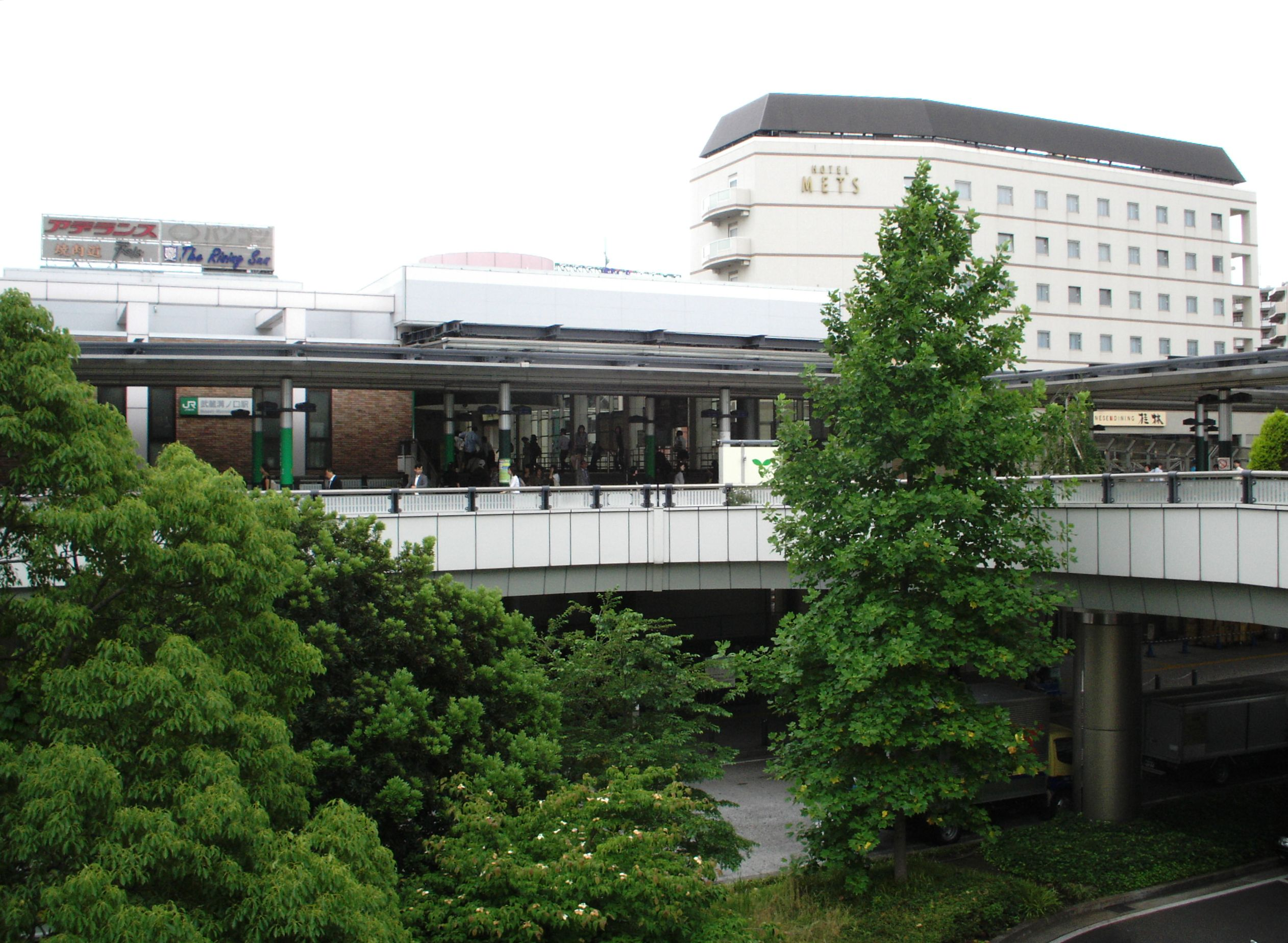
- Station building in 2007

General information
- Location: Mizonokuchi, Takatsu-ku, Kawasaki-shi, Kanagawa-ken 213-0001; Japan
- Coordinates: 35°35′57″N 139°36′39.52″E
- Operator: JR East
- Line: Nambu Line
- Distance: 12.7 km from Kawasaki
- Platforms: 1 side + 1 island platform
- Connections: Mizonokuchi; Bus terminal

Other information
- Status: Staffed (Midori no Madoguchi)
- Station code: JN10
- Website: Official website

History
- Opened: 9 March 1927

Passengers
- FY2019: 86,165 daily

Services
Preceding station	JR East	Following station
Noborito JN14 towards Tachikawa	Nambu Line Rapid	Musashi-Shinjō JN09 towards Kawasaki
Tsudayama JN11 towards Tachikawa	Nambu Line Local	Musashi-Shinjō JN09 towards Kawasaki
Location
- Location within Kanagawa Prefecture Location within Japan

Musashi-Mizonokuchi Station (武蔵溝ノ口駅, Musashi-Mizonokuchi-eki) is a passenger railway station located in Takatsu-ku, Kawasaki, Kanagawa Prefecture, Japan, operated by East Japan Railway Company (JR East).

== Lines ==
Musashi-Mizonokuchi Station is served by the Nambu Line, and is located 12.7 km (7.9 mi) from the terminus of the line at Kawasaki Station. Mizonokuchi Station on the Tōkyū Den-en-toshi and Oimachi lines is located next to this station.

== Station layout ==
The station consists of one side platform for ascending traffic (for Kawasaki), and one island platform for descending traffic (for Tachikawa). Platform 3 is used for services originating at this station. The station building was rebuilt as an elevated station in 1998. The station has a Midori no Madoguchi staffed ticket office.

=== Platforms ===
1	Nambu Line	for Musashi-Kosugi and Kawasaki
2	Nambu Line	for Noborito, Fuchū-Hommachi, and Tachikawa
3	Nambu Line	(starting/waiting trains for both directions)

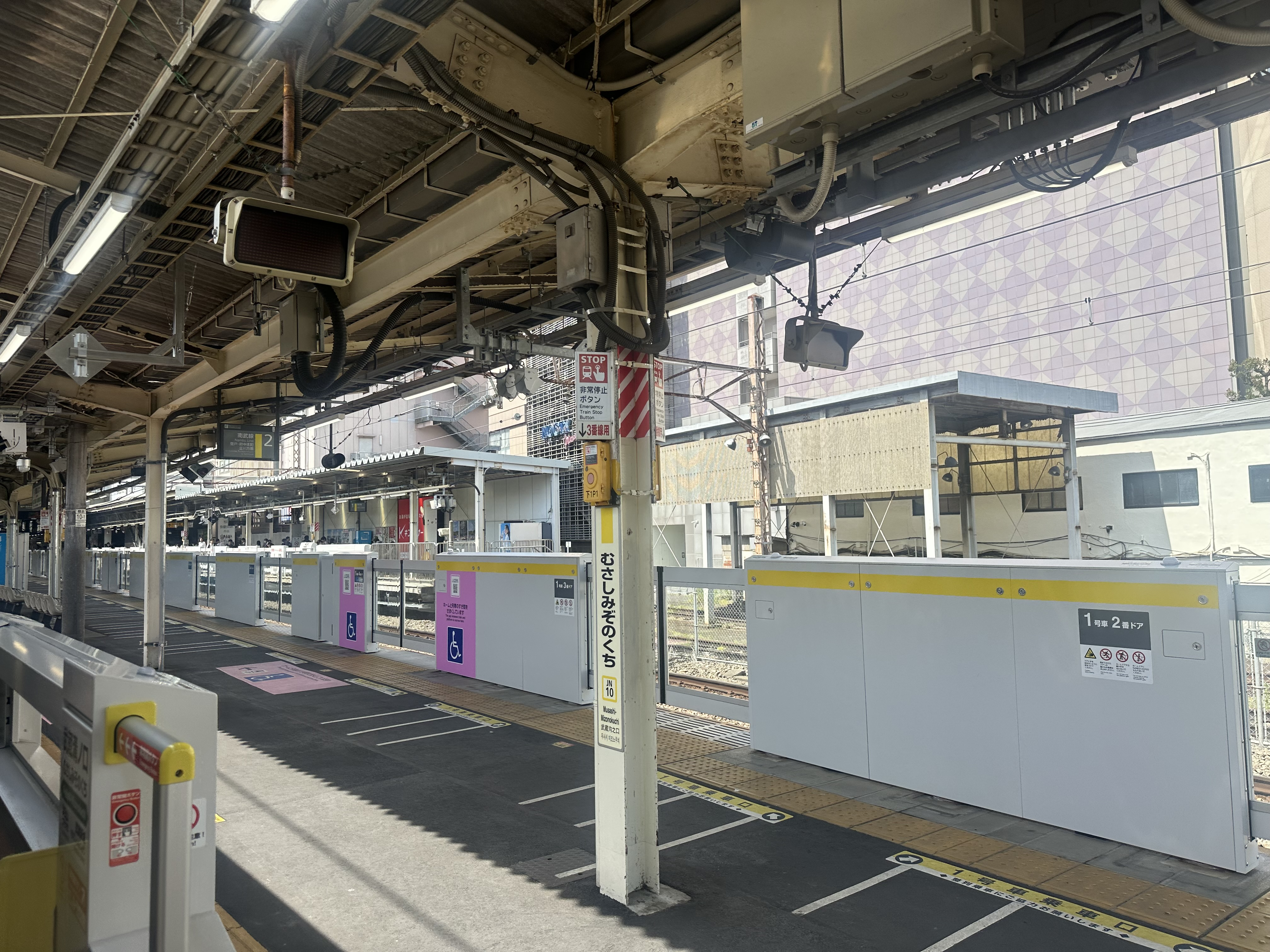

== History ==
Musashi-Mizonokuchi Station opened as a station on the Nambu Railway on 9 March 1927. The Nambu Railway was nationalized on 1 April 1944, becoming part of the Japanese Government Railway (JGR) system, which became the Japan National Railways (JNR) from 1946. Freight services were discontinued on 1 March 1976. Along with privatization and division of JNR, JR East started operating the station on 1 April 1987.

== Passenger statistics ==
In fiscal 2019, the station was used by an average of 86,165 passengers daily (boarding passengers only).

The passenger figures (boarding passengers only) for previous years are as shown below.

Fiscal year	daily average
2005	69,175
2010	75,653
2015	83,756

== See also ==
- List of railway stations in Japan
