= Nambu Line =

Railway line in Japan

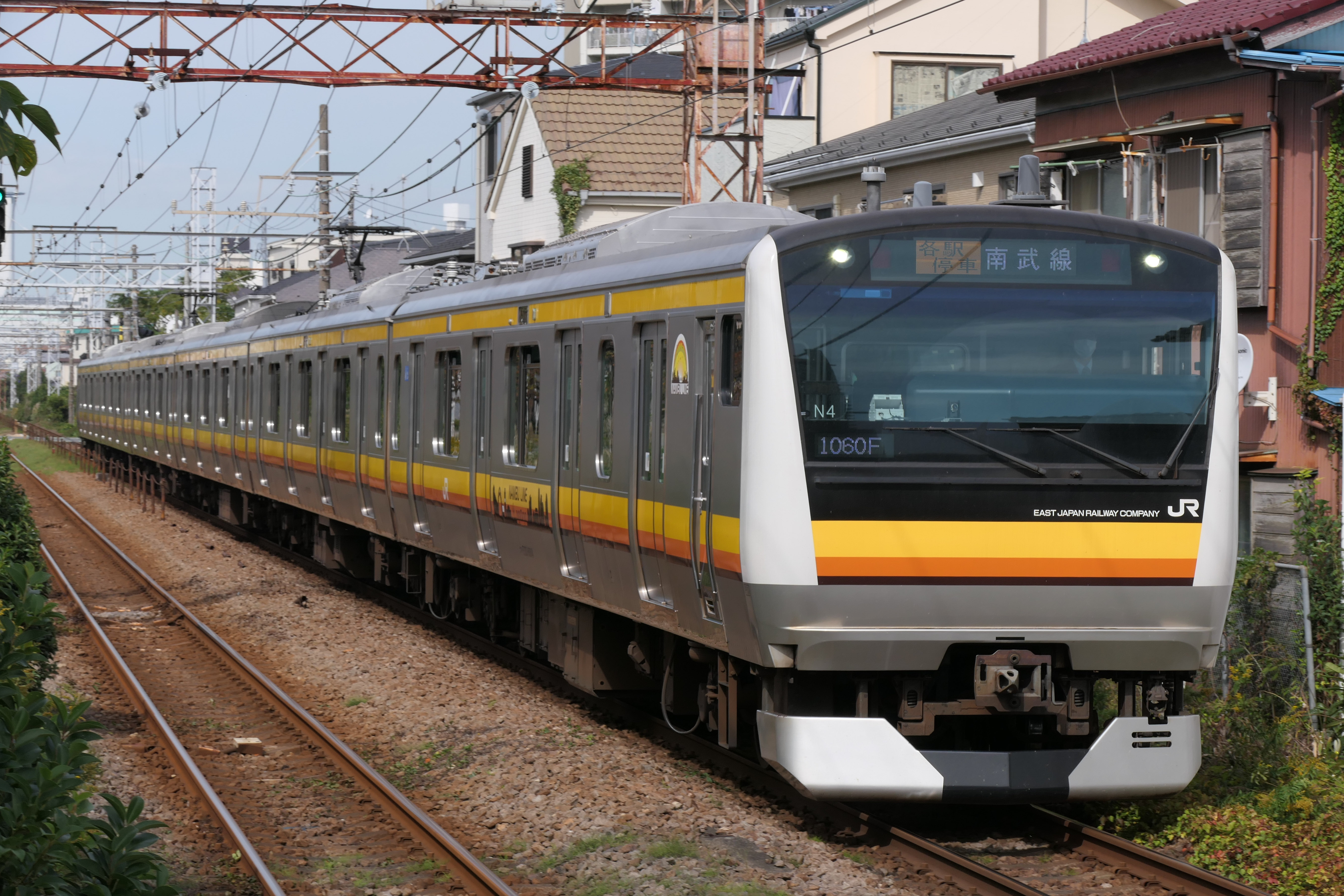
- The Nambu Line E233-8000 series EMU in October 2020

Overview
- Native name: 南武線
- Owner: JR East
- Locale: Tokyo, Kanagawa prefectures
- Termini: Kawasaki; Tachikawa
- Stations: 26 (main line), 3 (branch line)

Service
- Type: Heavy rail
- Depot: Nakahara
- Rolling stock: 205-1000 series, E127-0 series, E233-8000 series, E233-8500 series
- Daily ridership: 840,241 (daily 2015)

History
- Opened: 27 March 1927; 99 years ago

Technical
- Track length: 45.0 km (28.0 mi)
- Number of tracks: 2 (main line), 1 (branch)
- Track gauge: 1,067 mm (3 ft 6 in)
- Electrification: Overhead line, 1,500 V DC
- Operating speed: 95 km/h (59 mph)
- Train protection system: ATS-S
Route map

The Nambu Line (Japanese: 南武線, romanized: Nanbu-sen) is a Japanese railway line which connects Tachikawa Station in Tachikawa, Tokyo and Kawasaki Station in Kawasaki, Kanagawa. For most of its length, it parallels the Tama River, the natural border between Tokyo and Kanagawa prefectures. It lies along the Tama Hills. It is part of the East Japan Railway Company (JR East) network. The line forms part of what JR East refers to as the "Tokyo Mega Loop" (Japanese: 東京メガループ) around Tokyo, consisting of the Keiyo Line, Musashino Line, Nambu Line, and the Yokohama Line. The name refers to the southern (Japanese: 南) part of the ancient province of Musashi (Japanese: 武蔵) (now Tokyo and northern Kanagawa prefecture), through which the Nambu Line runs.

== Basic data ==
- Operators, distances:
  - Total: 45.0 km (28.0 mi)
    - Passenger: 39.6 km (24.6 mi)
    - Freight: 39.4 km (24.5 mi)
  - East Japan Railway Company (JR East) (Services and tracks)
    - Kawasaki – Tachikawa: 35.5 km (22.1 mi)
    - Shitte – Hama-Kawasaki: 4.1 km (2.5 mi)
    - Shitte – Shin-Tsurumi Signal Station – Tsurumi: 5.4 km (3.4 mi) (no regular service)
  - Japan Freight Railway Company (JR Freight) (Services only)
    - Shitte – Tachikawa: 33.8 km (21.0 mi)
    - Shitte – Hama-Kawasaki: 4.1 km (2.5 mi)
    - Shitte – Shin-Tsurumi Signal Station: 1.5 km (0.9 mi)
- Stations: 29
  - Main line: 26
  - Branch line: 3
- Double-tracking: Kawasaki – Tachikawa
- Railway signalling: Automatic Block System

== Station list ==
=== Main line ===
Two trains per hour operate as "Rapid" services between 10 a.m. and 4 p.m. All other trains, except some seasonal services, operate as "Local" services and stop at every station.

No.	Station	Distance in km (mi)		Rapid	Transfers	Location	
No.	Station	Between stations	Total	Rapid	Transfers	Location	
	Kawasaki 川崎	—N/a	0 (0)	●	Tōkaidō Line (JT04); Keihin–Tōhoku Line (JK16); Main Line (Keikyū Kawasaki: KK20); Daishi Line (Keikyū Kawasaki: KK20)	Kawasaki-ku, Kawasaki	Kanagawa
JN02	Shitte 尻手	1.7 (1.1)	1.7 (1.1)	|	Nambu Branch Line (JN02 for Hama-Kawasaki)	Saiwai-ku, Kawasaki	Kanagawa
JN03	Yakō 矢向	0.9 (0.56)	2.6 (1.6)	|		Tsurumi-ku, Yokohama	Kanagawa
JN04	Kashimada 鹿島田	1.5 (0.93)	4.1 (2.5)	●	Yokosuka Line (Shin-Kawasaki: JO14); Shōnan–Shinjuku Line (Shin-Kawasaki: JS14)	Saiwai-ku, Kawasaki	Kanagawa
JN05	Hirama 平間	1.2 (0.75)	5.3 (3.3)	|		Nakahara-ku, Kawasaki	Kanagawa
JN06	Mukaigawara 向河原	1.3 (0.81)	6.6 (4.1)	|		Nakahara-ku, Kawasaki	Kanagawa
	Musashi-Kosugi 武蔵小杉	0.9 (0.56)	7.5 (4.7)	●	Yokosuka Line (JO15); Shōnan–Shinjuku Line (JS15); Sōtetsu–JR Link Line (JS15); Tōyoko Line (TY11); Meguro Line (MG11)	Nakahara-ku, Kawasaki	Kanagawa
JN08	Musashi-Nakahara 武蔵中原	1.7 (1.1)	9.2 (5.7)	●		Nakahara-ku, Kawasaki	Kanagawa
JN09	Musashi-Shinjō 武蔵新城	1.3 (0.81)	10.5 (6.5)	●		Nakahara-ku, Kawasaki	Kanagawa
JN10	Musashi-Mizonokuchi 武蔵溝ノ口	2.2 (1.4)	12.7 (7.9)	●	Den-en-toshi Line (Mizonokuchi: DT10); Ōimachi Line (Mizonokuchi: OM16)	Takatsu-ku, Kawasaki	Kanagawa
JN11	Tsudayama 津田山	1.2 (0.75)	13.9 (8.6)	|		Takatsu-ku, Kawasaki	Kanagawa
JN12	Kuji 久地	1.0 (0.62)	14.9 (9.3)	|		Takatsu-ku, Kawasaki	Kanagawa
JN13	Shukugawara 宿河原	1.3 (0.81)	16.2 (10.1)	|		Tama-ku, Kawasaki	Kanagawa
JN14	Noborito 登戸	1.1 (0.68)	17.3 (10.7)	●	Odawara Line (OH18)	Tama-ku, Kawasaki	Kanagawa
JN15	Nakanoshima 中野島	2.2 (1.4)	19.5 (12.1)	|		Tama-ku, Kawasaki	Kanagawa
JN16	Inadazutsumi 稲田堤	1.3 (0.81)	20.8 (12.9)	●	Sagamihara Line (Keiō-Inadazutsumi KO36)	Tama-ku, Kawasaki	Kanagawa
JN17	Yanokuchi 矢野口	1.6 (0.99)	22.4 (13.9)	|		Inagi	Tokyo
JN18	Inagi-Naganuma 稲城長沼	1.7 (1.1)	24.1 (15.0)	●		Inagi	Tokyo
JN19	Minami-Tama 南多摩	1.4 (0.87)	25.5 (15.8)	|	Tamagawa Line (Koremasa SW06)	Inagi	Tokyo
JN20	Fuchū-Hommachi 府中本町	2.4 (1.5)	27.9 (17.3)	●	Musashino Line (JM35)	Fuchū	Tokyo
JN21	Bubaigawara 分倍河原	0.9 (0.56)	28.8 (17.9)	●	Keiō Line (KO25)	Fuchū	Tokyo
JN22	Nishifu 西府	1.2 (0.75)	30.0 (18.6)	|		Fuchū	Tokyo
JN23	Yaho 谷保	1.6 (0.99)	31.6 (19.6)	|		Kunitachi	Tokyo
JN24	Yagawa 矢川	1.4 (0.87)	33.0 (20.5)	|		Kunitachi	Tokyo
JN25	Nishi-Kunitachi 西国立	1.3 (0.81)	34.3 (21.3)	|		Tachikawa	Tokyo
JN26	Tachikawa 立川	1.2 (0.75)	35.5 (22.1)	●	Chūō Line (JC19); Ōme Line (JC19); Tama Toshi Monorail Line (Tachikawa-Kita TT12, Tachikawa-Minami TT11)	Tachikawa	Tokyo

=== Nambu Branch Line ===
All stations are located in Kanagawa Prefecture. Trains can pass each other only at Kawasaki-Shinmachi.

No.	Station	Distance in km (mi)		Transfers	Location
No.	Station	Between stations	Total	Transfers	Location
JN02	Shitte 尻手	—N/a	0 (0)	Nambu Main Line (JN02 for Kawasaki or Tachikawa)	Saiwai-ku, Kawasaki
JN51	Hatchōnawate 八丁畷	1.1 (0.68)	1.1 (0.68)	Main Line (KK27)	Kawasaki-ku, Kawasaki
JN52	Kawasaki-Shinmachi 川崎新町	0.9 (0.56)	2.0 (1.2)		Kawasaki-ku, Kawasaki
JN53	Odasakae 小田栄	0.7 (0.43)	2.7 (1.7)		Kawasaki-ku, Kawasaki
JN54	Hama-Kawasaki 浜川崎	1.4 (0.87)	4.1 (2.5)	Tsurumi Line (JI08)	Kawasaki-ku, Kawasaki

=== Freight branch ===
The "Shitte crossover" (尻手短絡線, Shitte-tanraku-sen) connects Shitte Station and Shin-Tsurumi Yard on the Tōkaidō Main Line (Hinkaku Line) and the Musashino Line. Freight trains operating between Tokyo Freight Terminal and northern Japan operate on both branch lines.

== Rolling stock ==
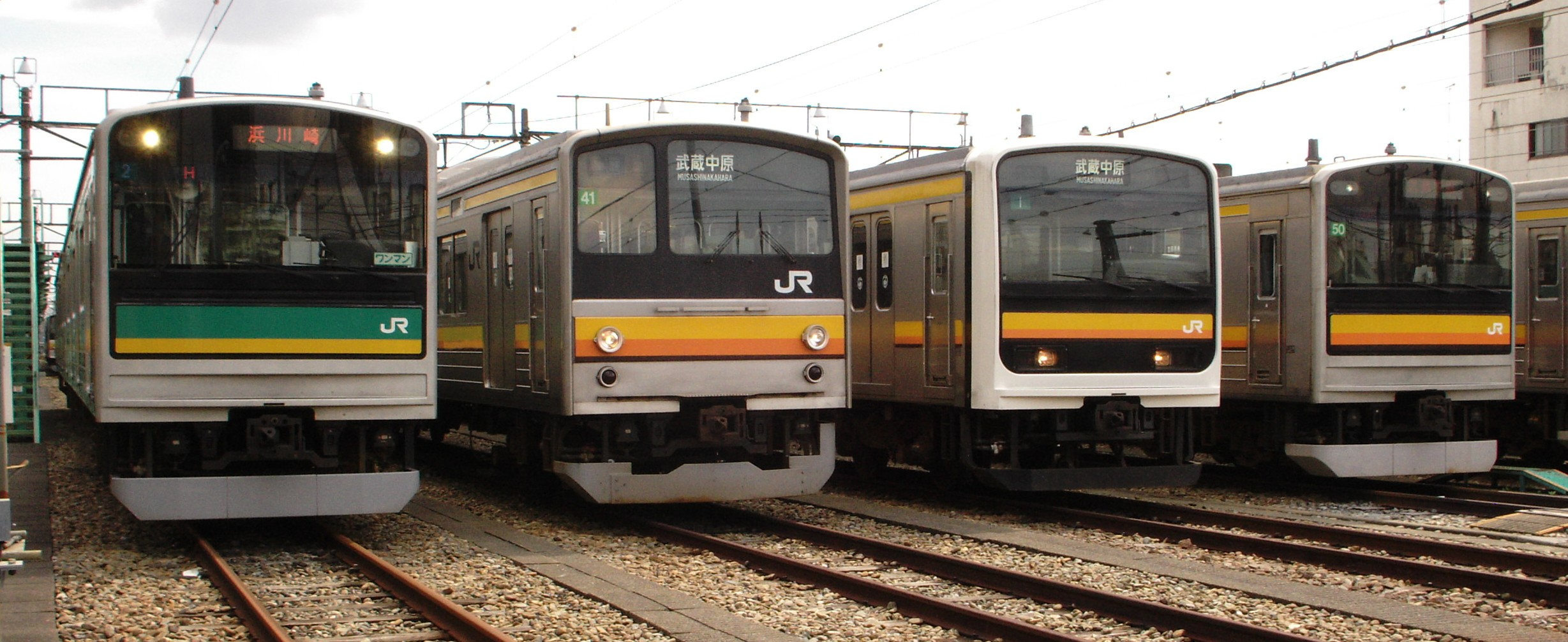
Nambu Line rolling stock at Nakahara Depot

As of 1 October 2016 the following fleet of electric multiple unit (EMU) trains is used on Nambu Line services, with all trainsets based at Nakahara Depot.

- 205-1000 series 3 x 2-car EMUs (Nambu Branch Line services, since August 2002)
- E127-0 series 2 x 2-car EMUs (Nambu Branch Line services, since September 2023)
- E233-8000 series 35 x 6-car EMUs (since 4 October 2014)
- E233-8500 series 1 x 6-car EMU (since 15 March 2017)

From 15 March 2017, the last remaining 209 series trainset, set 53, was replaced by a six-car Ome Line and Itsukaichi Line E233-0 series set 670 modified and renumbered to become E233-8500 series set N36.

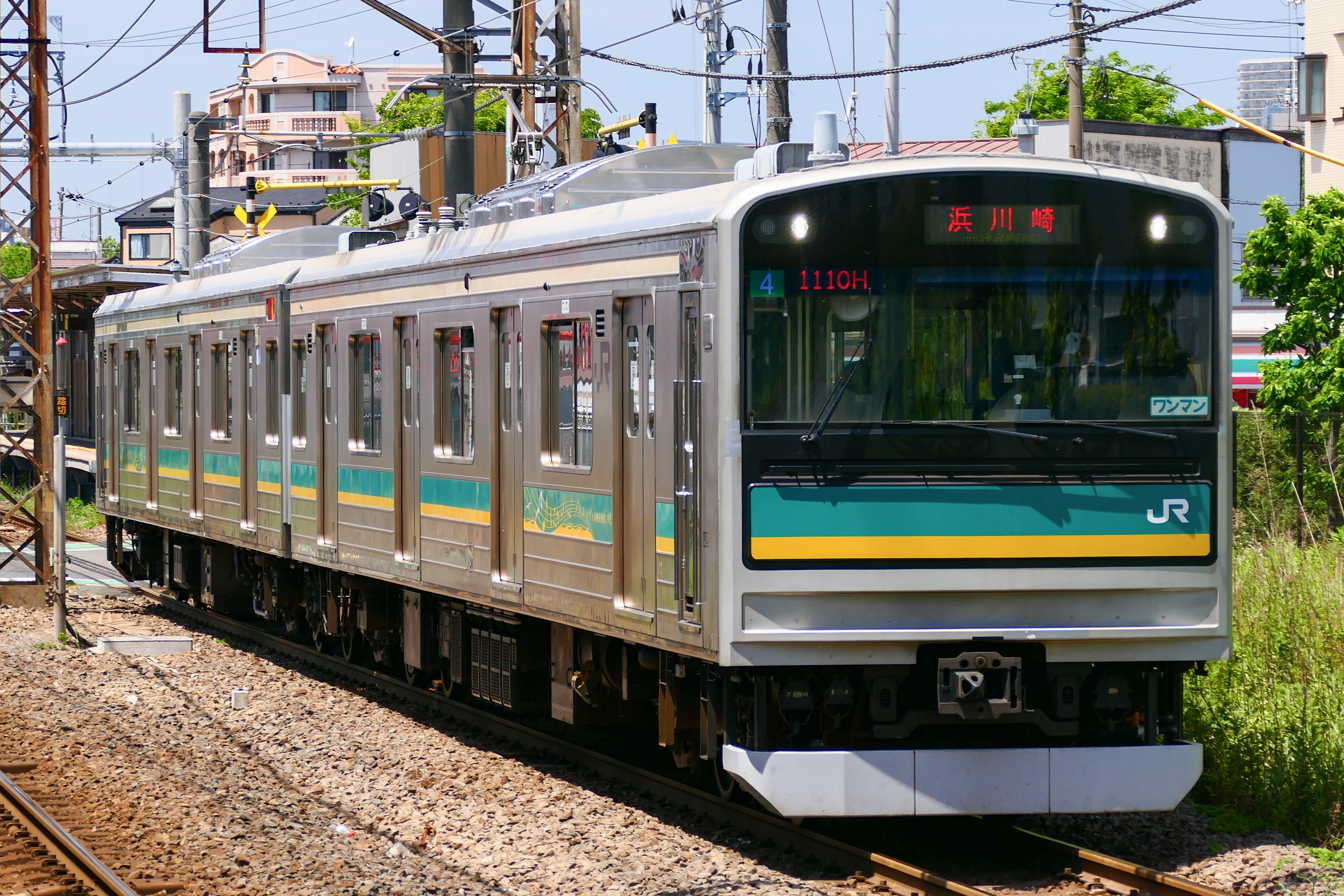
A Nambu Branch Line 205-1000 series in May 2023

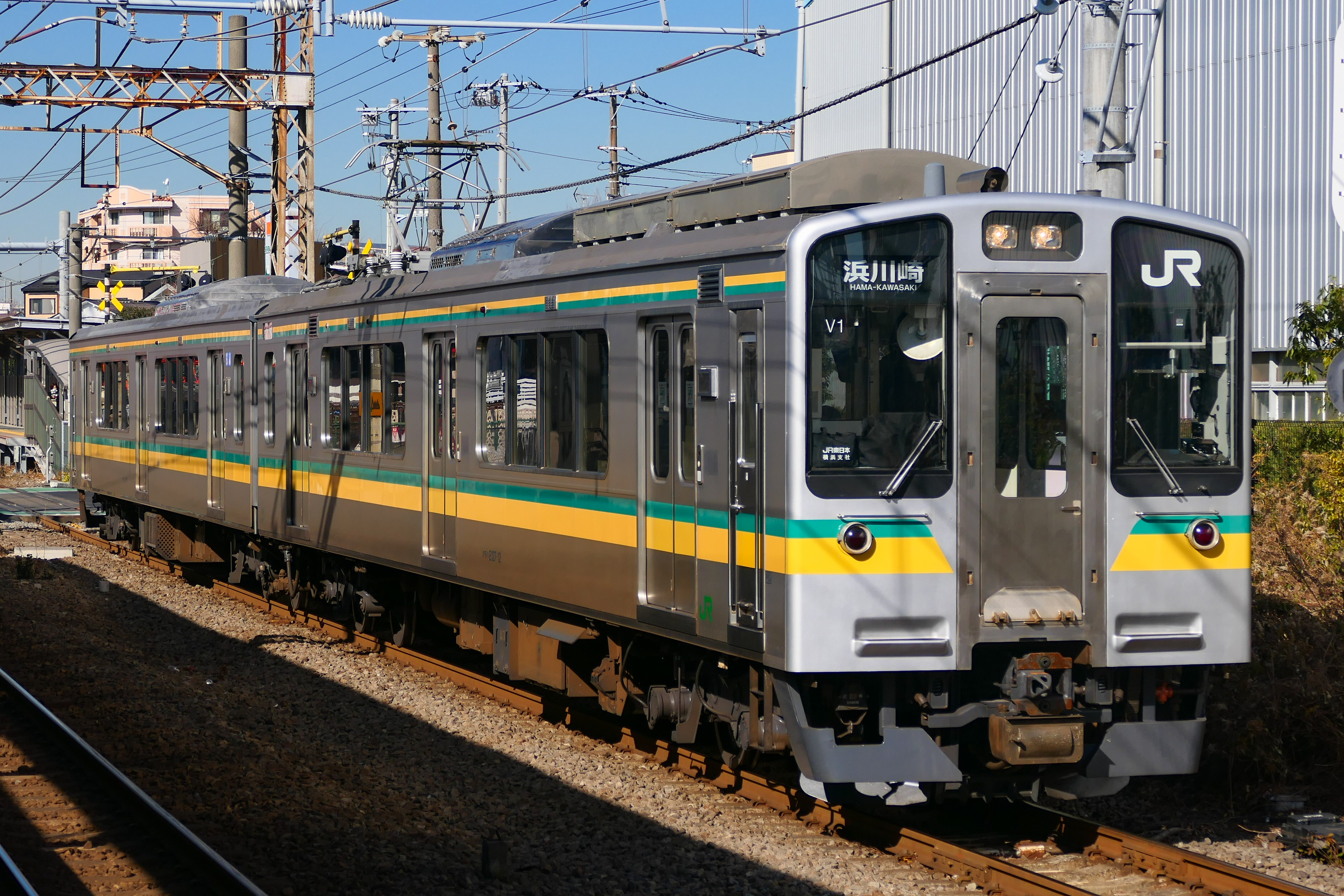
A Nambu Branch Line E127-0 series in January 2024

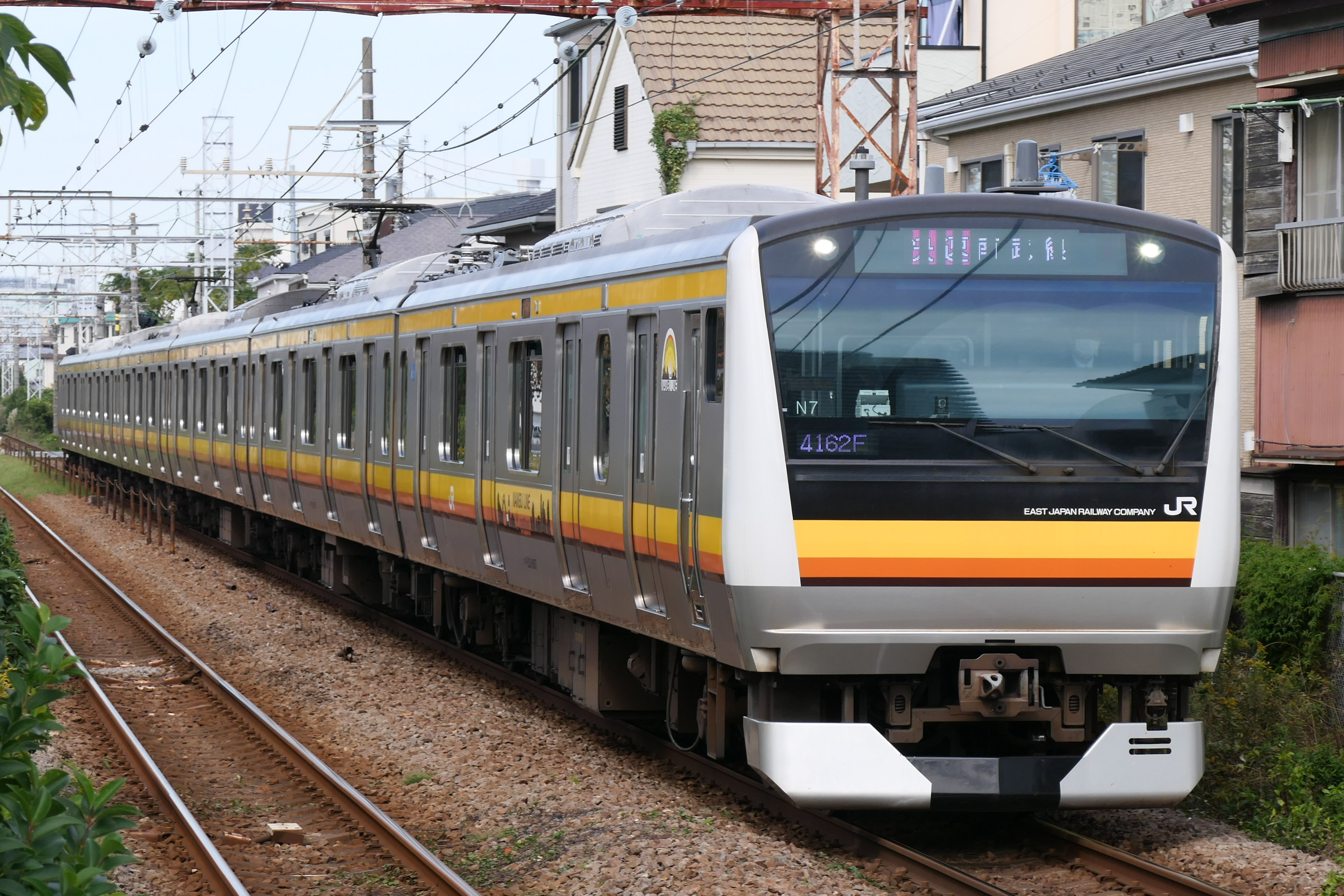
A Nambu Line E233-8000 series in October 2020

=== Previously used ===
- 72/73 series 4/6-car EMUs (from 1963 until 1978)
- 101 series 4/6-car EMUs (from 1969 until January 1991)
- 103 series 6-car EMUs (from 1982 until December 2004)
- 101 series 2-car EMUs (Nambu Branch line services, until November 2003)
- 205-0 series 6-car EMUs from (March 1989 until December 2015)
- 205-1200 series 6-car EMUs (from 2004 until January 2016)
- 209-0 series 6-car EMUs (from April 1993 until February 2015)
- 209-2200 series 6-car EMUs (from 2010 until March 2017)
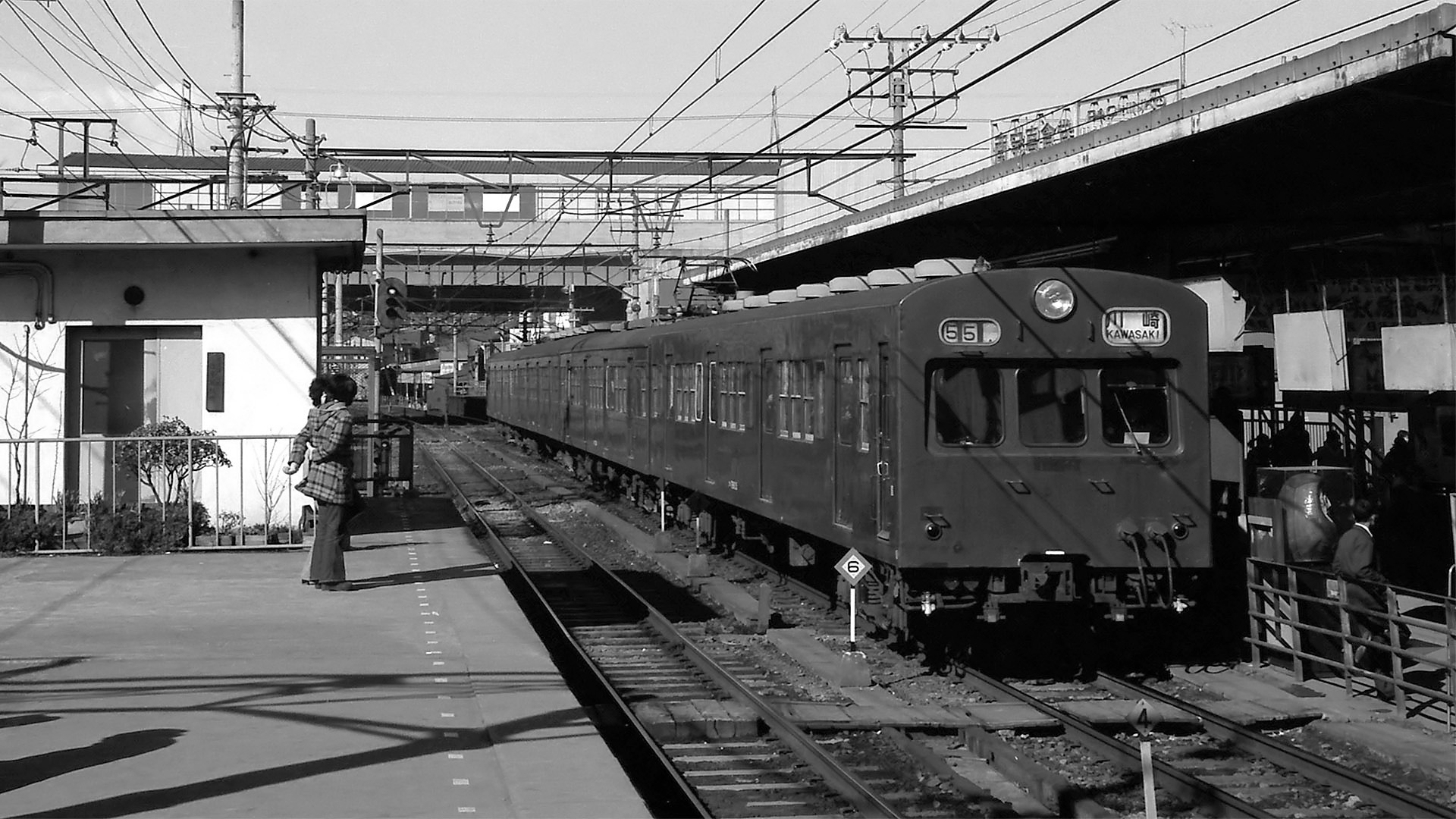
A 73 series EMU on the Nambu Line in January 1975

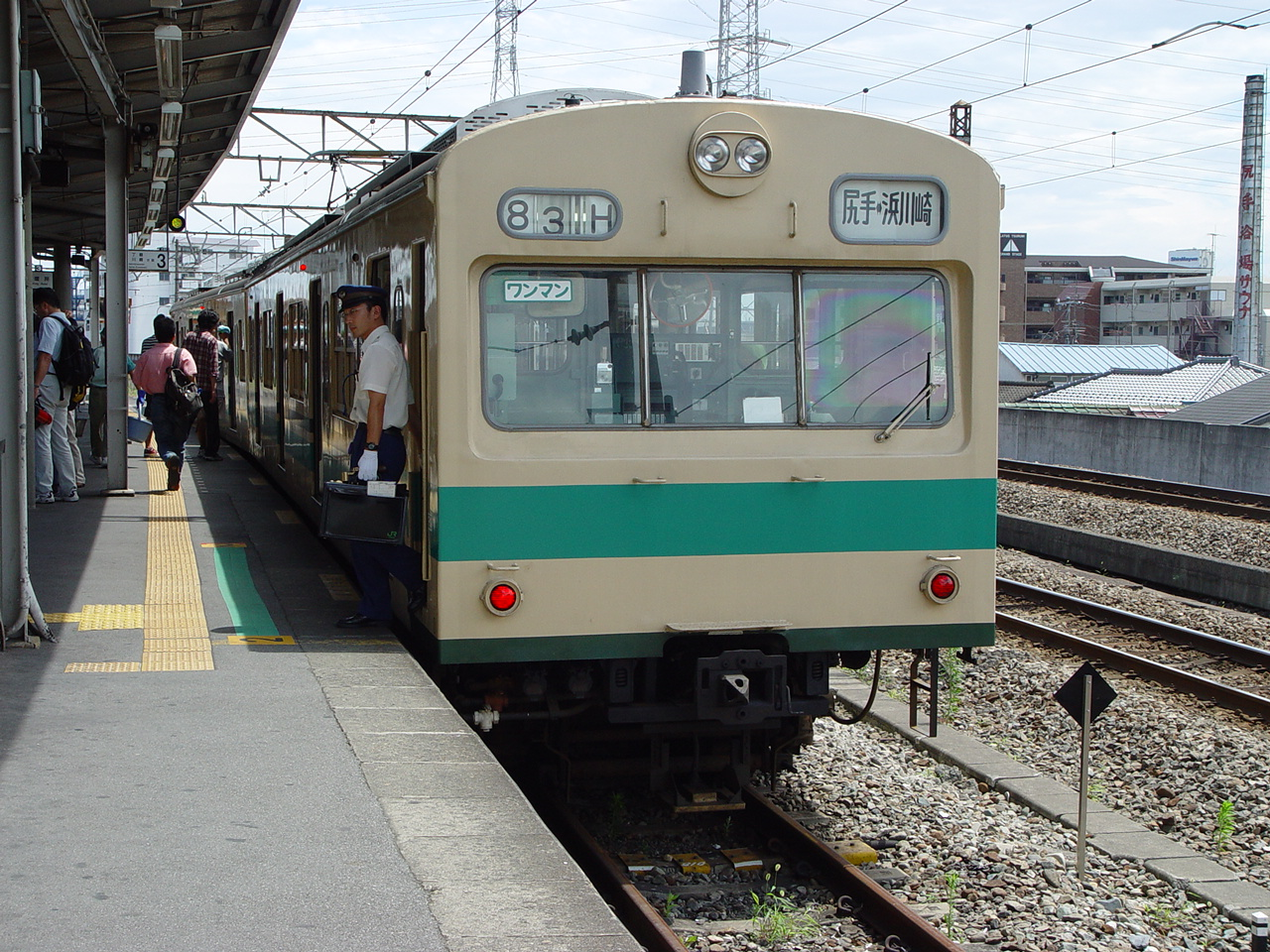
Nambu Branch Line 101 series in July 2002

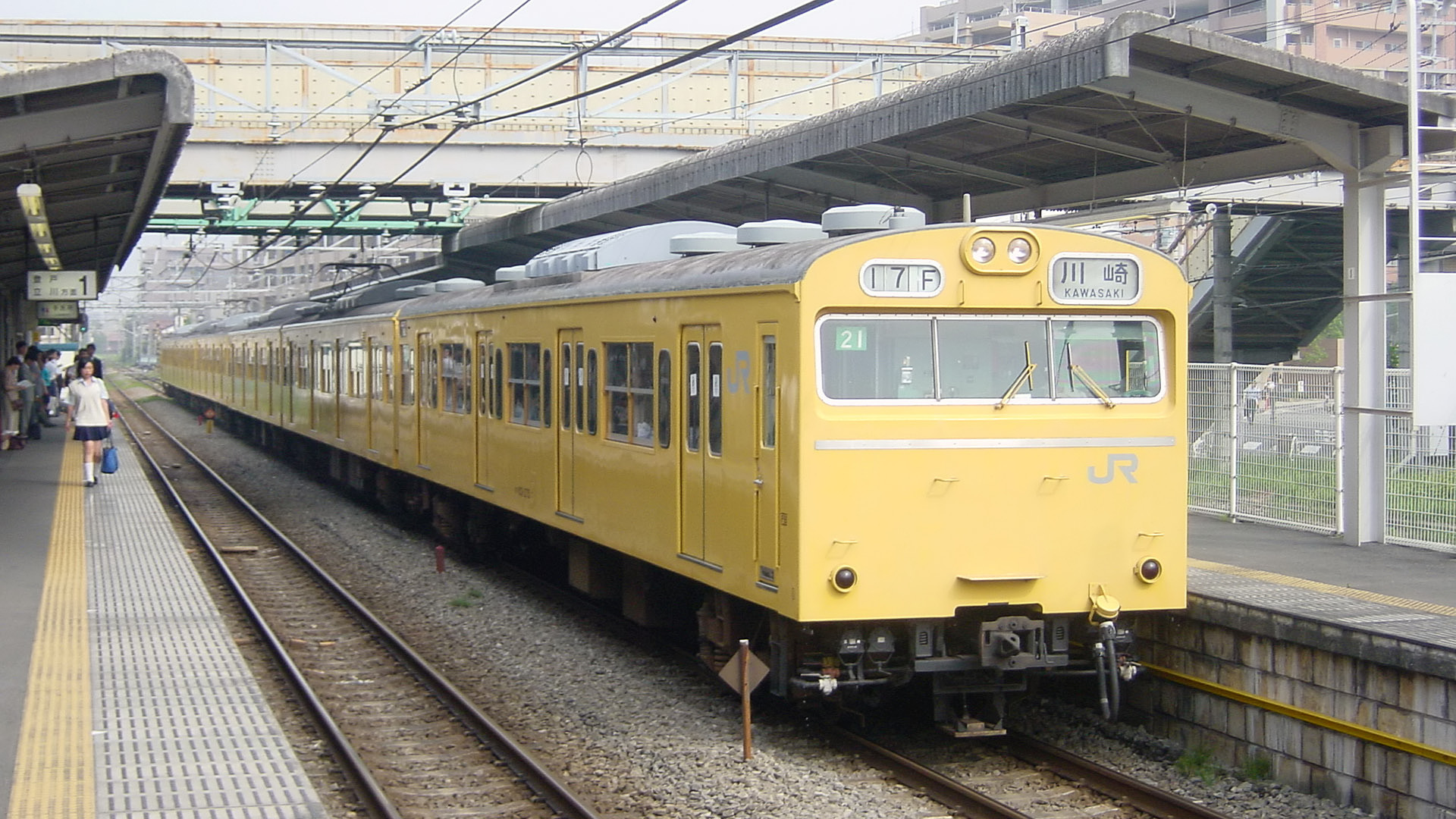
A Nambu Line 103 series in June 2001

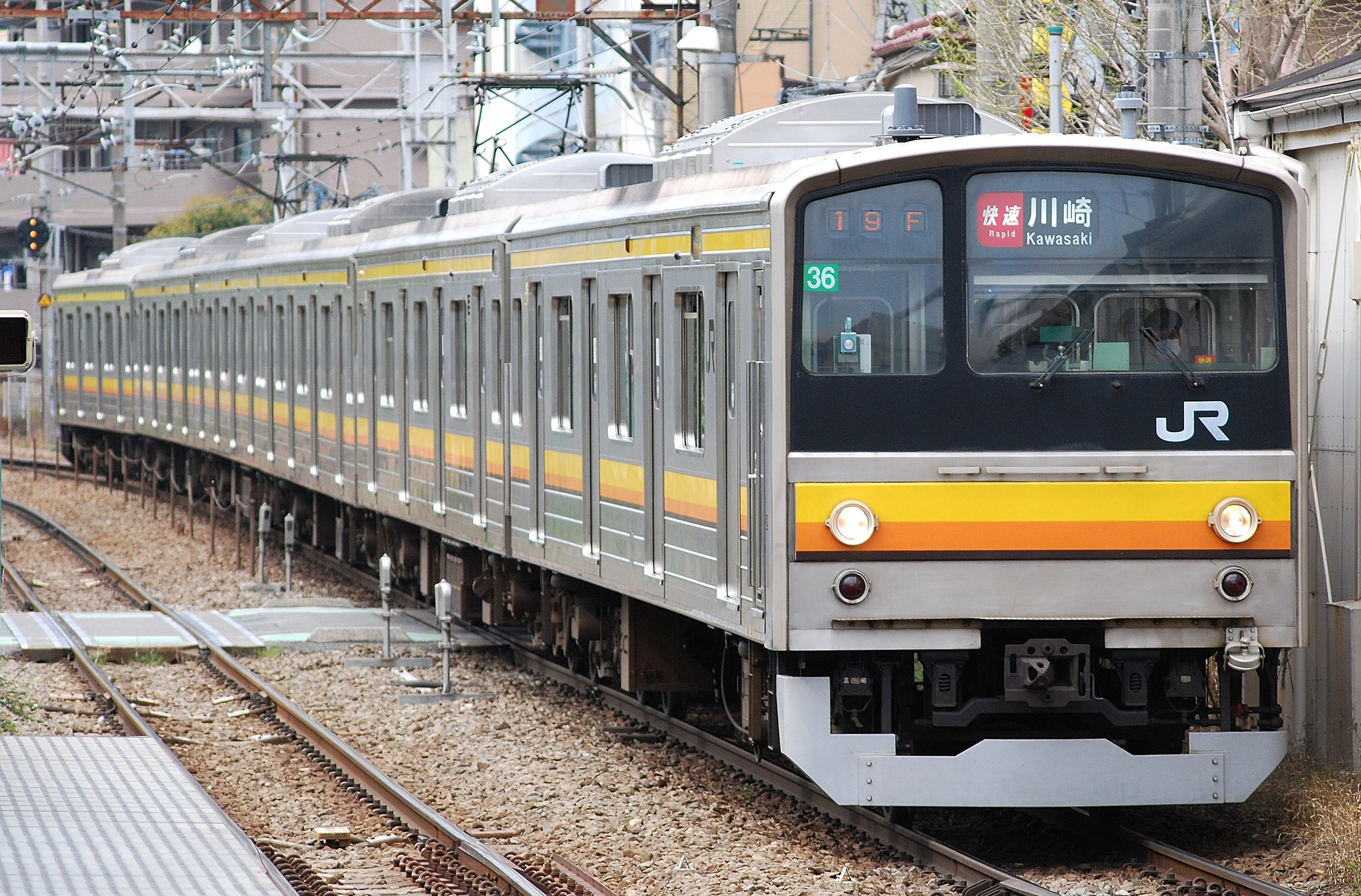
Nambu Line 205-0 series set 36 in April 2011

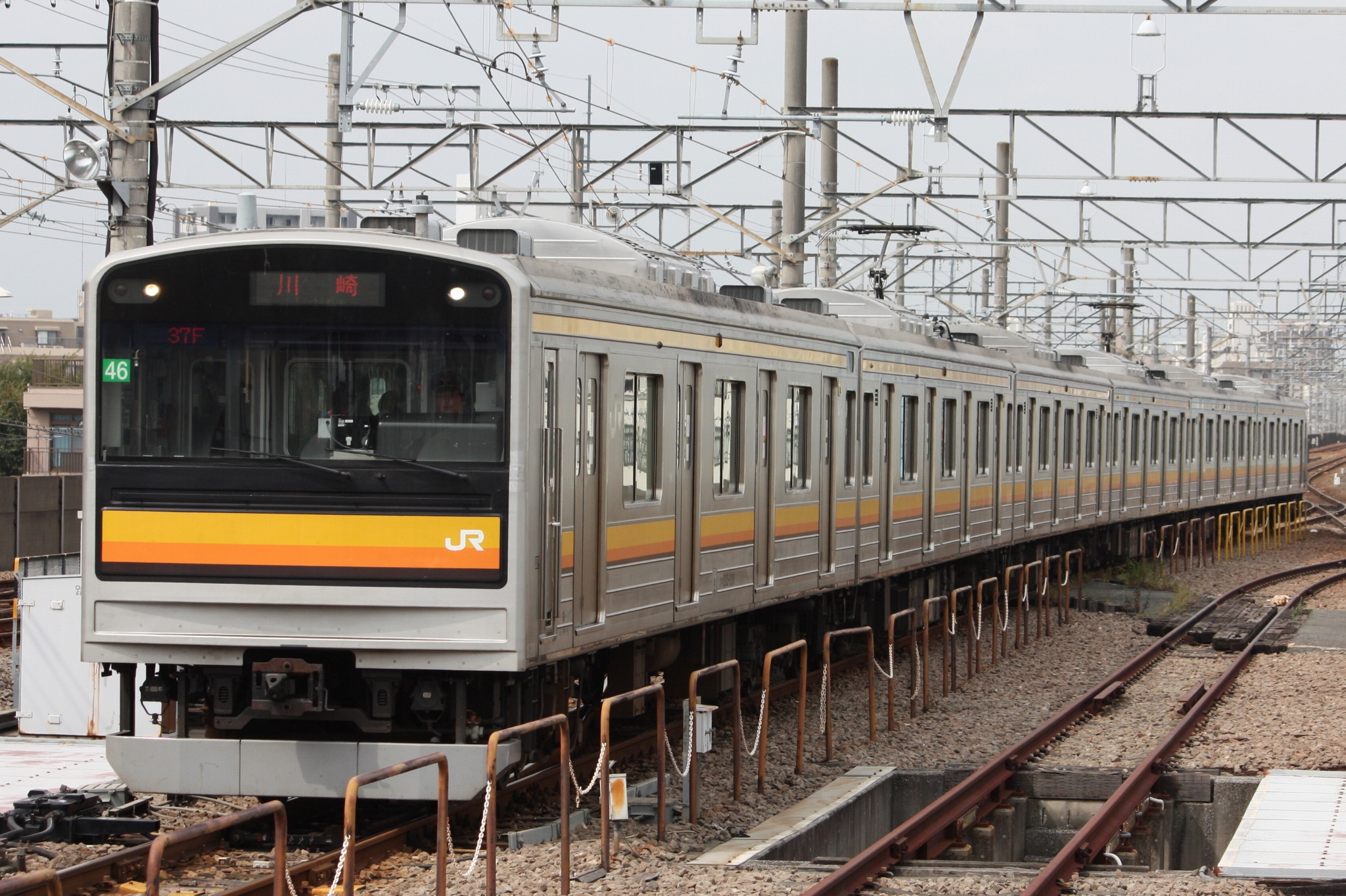
A Nambu Line 205-1200 series in October 2014

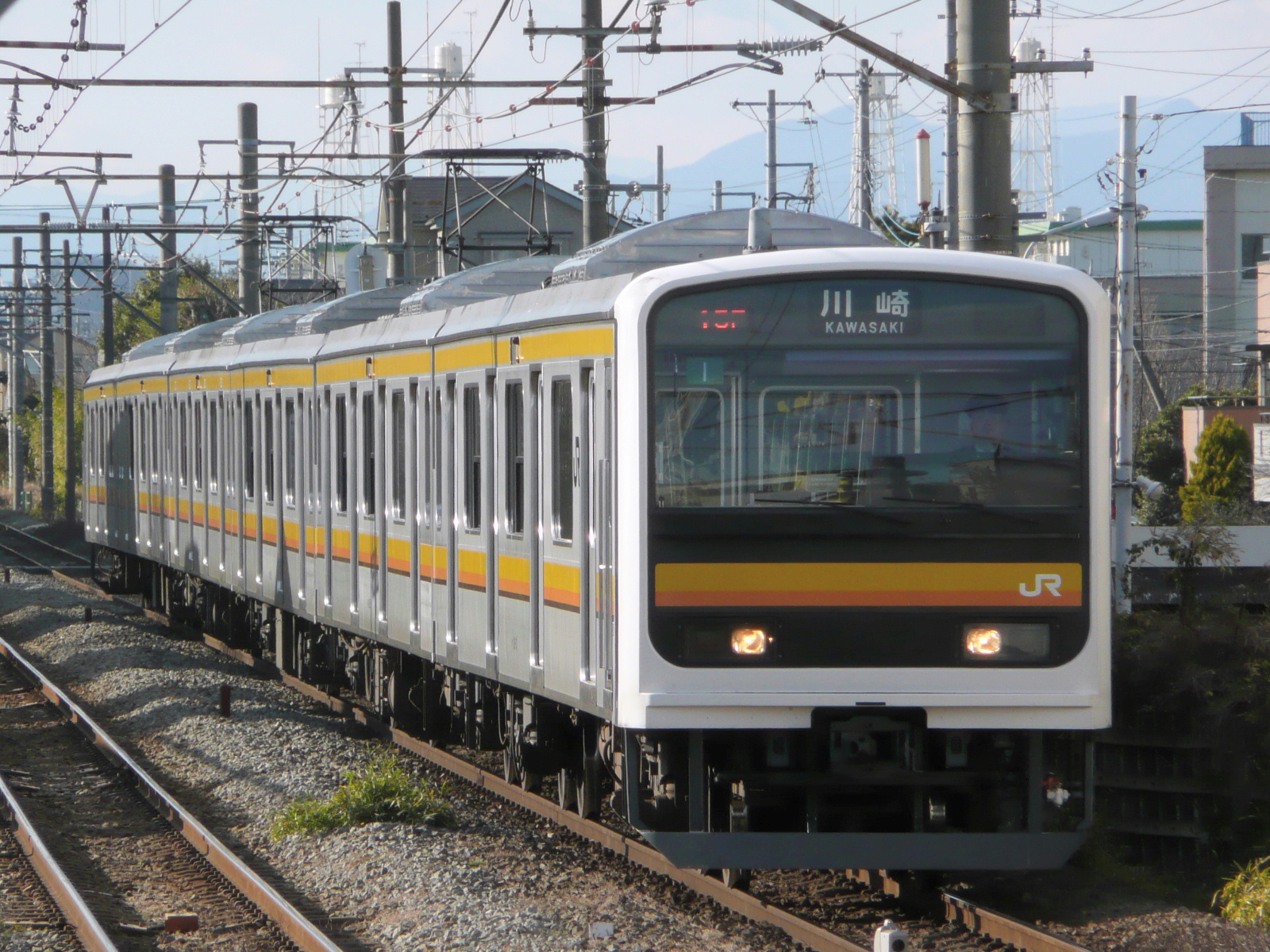
A Nambu Line 209-0 series in January 2008

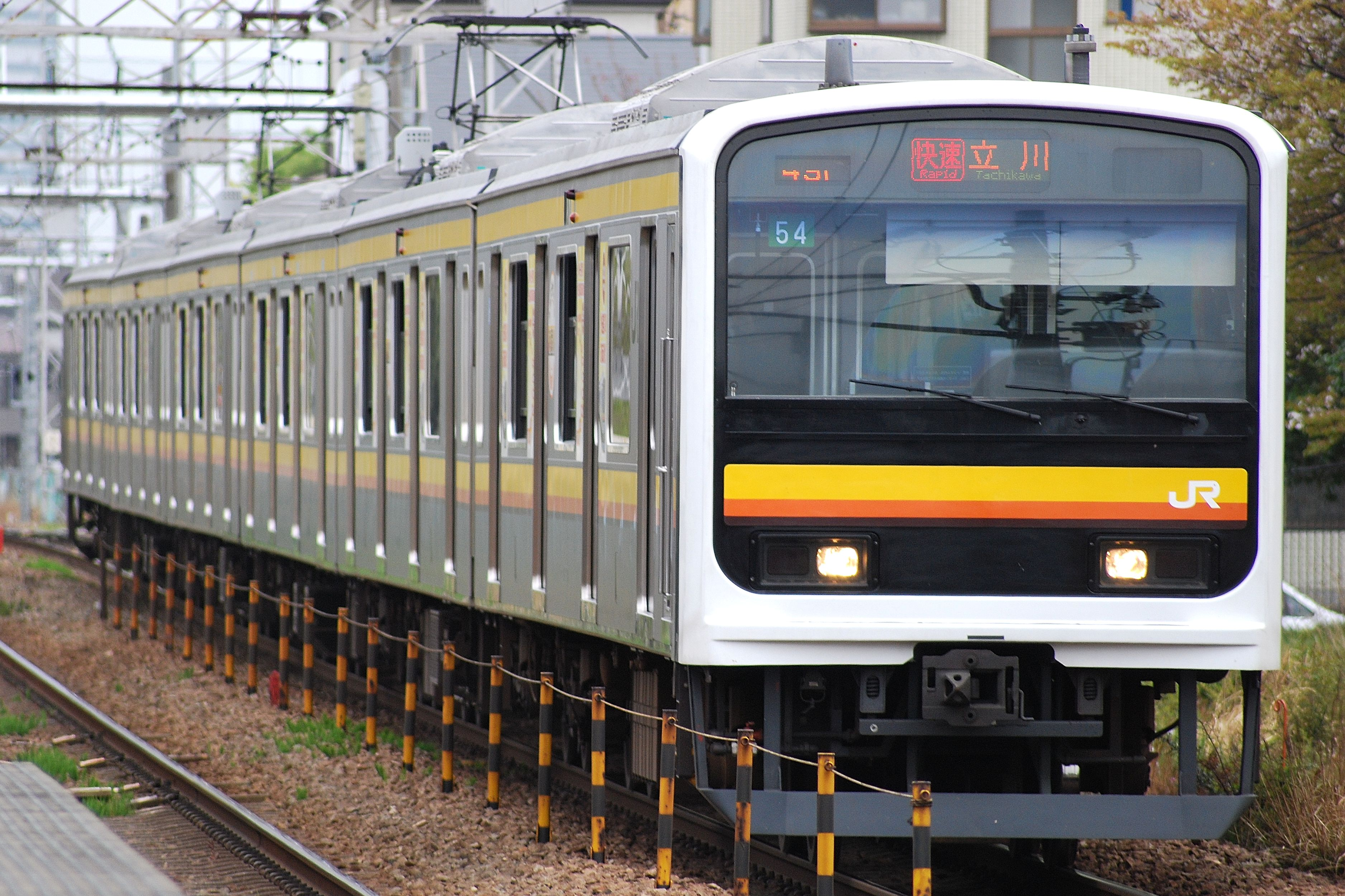
A Nambu Line 209-2200 series in April 2011

== History ==
The private Nambu Railway opened the line in five stages between 1927 and 1930 (freight branches are omitted):

- 27 March 1927: Kawasaki – Noborito
- 1 November 1927: Noborito – Ōmaru (near Minami-Tama)
- 11 December 1928: Ōmaru – Bubaigawara (then called Yashikibun)
- 11 December 1929: Bubaigawara – Tachikawa
- 25 March 1930: Shitte – Hama-Kawasaki

Passenger trains utilised electric multiple units (EMUs) from the beginning. Freight initially consisted primarily of gravel hauled from the Tama River. When the railway reached Tachikawa and made connection with the Ōme Electric Railway, limestone became one of the main freight commodities. The railway was controlled by Asano zaibatsu, which enabled the transport of limestone from its own quarry in Western Tokyo to its cement plant in Kawasaki without using the government railways.

On 1 April 1944, the railway was nationalised by the imperial government and became the Nambu Line of Japanese Government Railways. After the end of World War II, there were several calls for the privatisation of the line, but the line remained a part of the Japanese National Railways (JNR) until its privatization in 1987.

The postwar growth of the Tokyo urban area resulted in the conversion of most of the farmlands along the Nambu Line into residential areas and increased the passenger traffic on the line. Freight traffic reduced after the opening of the Musashino Line (parallel to the Nambu Line) in 1976 and the discontinuance of the limestone freight in 1998, except for the Nambu Branchline, which remains a major freight route.

Limited-stop "Rapid" services between Kawasaki and Noborito with stops at Musashi-Kosugi and Musashi-Mizonokuchi started on 15 December 1969, but were discontinued by the timetable revision on 2 October 1978. After 33 years, Rapid services between Kawasaki and Tachikawa with more stops started on 9 April 2011, postponed from the originally scheduled 12 March due to the 2011 Tōhoku earthquake and tsunami.

On 20 August 2016, station numbering was introduced with Nambu line stations being assigned station numbers between JN01 and JN26. Numbers increase towards in the westbound direction towards Tachikawa. In addition, station numbers JN51 to JN54 were assigned to the branch line stations with numbers increasing in the direction of Hama-Kawasaki.

From 15 March 2025, Nambu line started operation as "wanman" (One-man) driver-only operation.

== See also ==
- List of railway lines in Japan
