= Noborito Station =

Railway station in Kawasaki, Kanagawa Prefecture, Japan

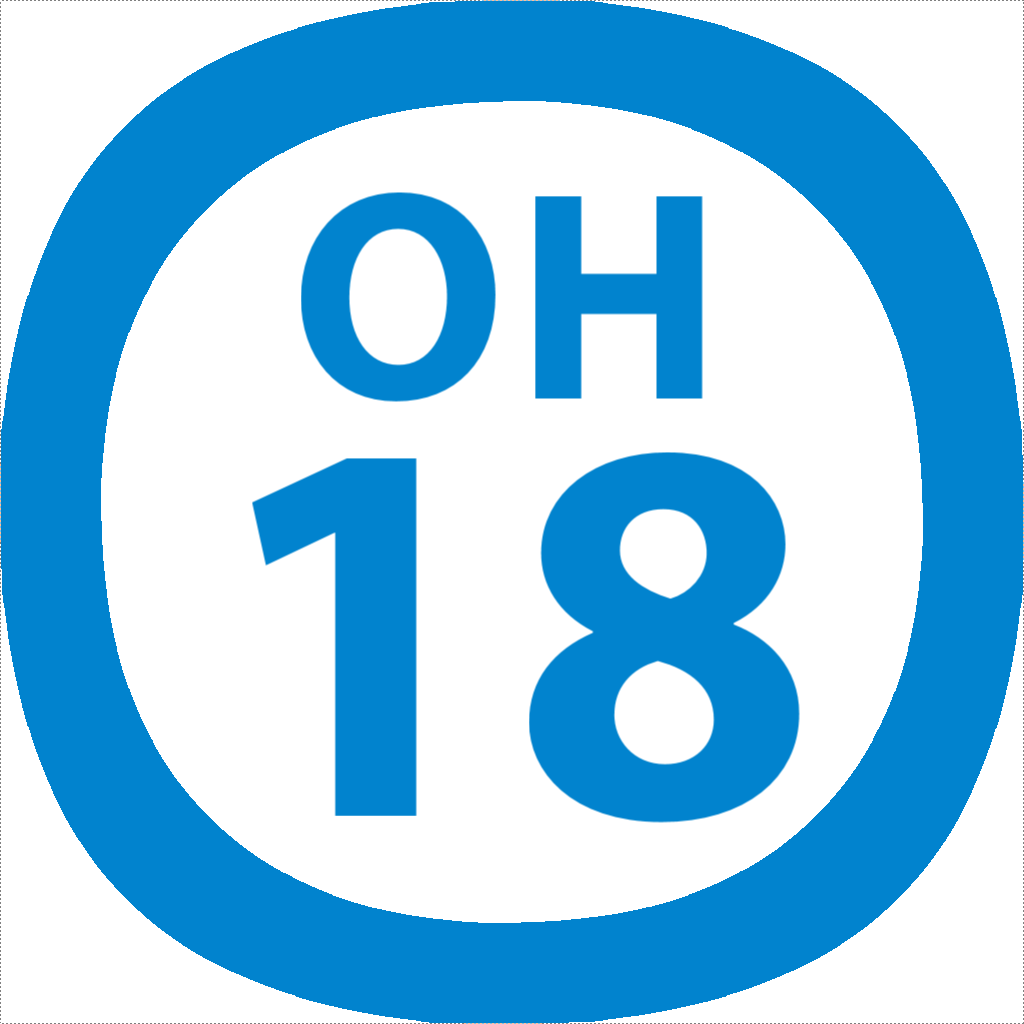
JN14 Noborito Station 登戸駅

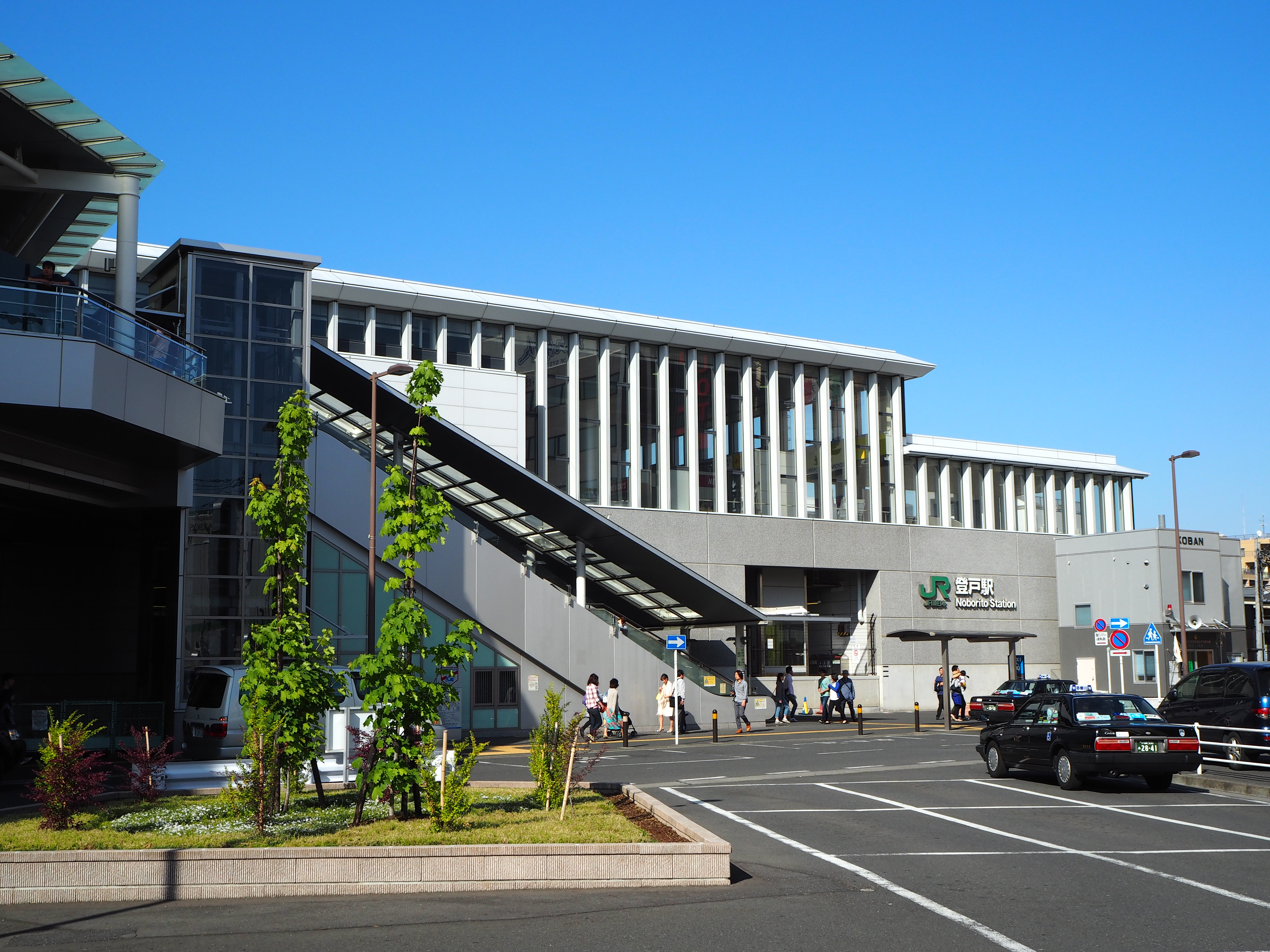
- Noborito Station, May 2015

General information
- Location: Noborito 3435, Tama-ku, Kawasaki-shi, Kanagawa-ken 214-0014; Japan
- Coordinates: 35°37′15″N 139°34′12″E
- Operator: JR East; Odakyu Electric Railway
- Lines: Nambu Line; Odawara Line
- Platforms: 1 side + 3 island platforms
- Connections: Bus stop

Other information
- Status: Staffed (Midori no Madoguchi)
- Station code: JN14, OH18

History
- Opened: 9 March 1927; 99 years ago

Passengers
- FY2019: 82,838 (JR, boarding only); 167,685 (Odakyu, total)

Services
| Preceding station | JR East | Following station |
|---|---|---|
| Inadazutsumi JN16 towards Tachikawa | Nambu Line Rapid | Musashi-Mizonokuchi JN10 towards Kawasaki |
| Nakanoshima JN15 towards Tachikawa | Nambu Line Local | Shukugawara JN13 towards Kawasaki |
| Preceding station | Odakyu | Following station |
| Shin-Yurigaoka towards Odawara | Odawara Line Rapid Express | Shimo-Kitazawa towards Shinjuku |
| Mukogaoka-Yuen towards Odawara | Odawara Line Express | Seijōgakuen-Mae towards Shinjuku or Yoyogi-Uehara |
| Mukogaoka-Yuen One-way operation | Odawara Line Commuter Semi Express | Seijōgakuen-Mae towards Yoyogi-Uehara |
| Mukogaoka-Yuen towards Isehara | Odawara Line Semi Express | Komae towards Yoyogi-Uehara |
| Mukogaoka-Yuen towards Hakone-Yumoto | Odawara Line Local | Izumi-Tamagawa towards Shinjuku or Yoyogi-Uehara |
Location
- Location within Kanagawa Prefecture Location within Japan

Noborito Station (登戸駅, Noborito-eki) is an interchange passenger railway station in the Noborito neighborhood of Tama-ku, Kawasaki, Kanagawa Prefecture, Japan, operated by East Japan Railway Company (JR East) and the private railway company Odakyu Electric Railway.

== Lines ==
Noborito Station is served by the Nambu Line and is 17.3 km (10.7 mi) from the terminus of the line at Kawasaki Station. It is also served by the Odakyu Odawara Line and is 15.2 km (9.4 mi) from the terminus of that line at Shinjuku Station.

== Station layout ==
JR Noborito Station has one side platform and one island platform serving three elevated tracks, connected by an underpass. The station has a Midori no Madoguchi staffed ticket office. Odakyu Noborito Station is an elevated station with two island platforms serving four elevated tracks.

=== JR platforms ===
| 1 | Nambu Line | for Fuchū-Hommachi, Tachikawa |
| 2 | Nambu Line | siding |
| 3 | Nambu Line | for Musashi-Mizonokuchi, Musashi-Kosugi, and Kawasaki |

=== Odakyu platforms ===
| 1 | Odakyu Odawara Line | for Odawara, Karakida, and Katase-Enoshima |
| 2 | Odakyu Odawara Line | for Odawara, Karakida, and Katase-Enoshima |
| 3 | Odakyu Odawara Line | for Shinjuku; Tokyo Metro Chiyoda Line for Ayase; Joban Line for Abiko and Toride |
| 4 | Odakyu Odawara Line | for Shinjuku |

== History ==
Noborito Station opened as a station on the Nambu Railway on 9 March 1927. The adjacent Odawara Line station opened on 1 April 1927 as Inada-Tamagawa Station (稲田多摩川駅, Inada-Tamagawa-eki). The Nambu Railway was nationalized on 1 April 1944 becoming part of the Japanese Government Railway (JGR) system, which became the Japan National Railways (JNR) from 1949. The adjacent Odawara Line station was renamed Noborito-Tamagawa Station (登戸多摩川駅, Noborito-Tamagawa-eki) in April 1955, and the name shortened to its present name on 1 April 1958. Freight services were discontinued on the Nambu Line from 1 April 1972. Along with privatization and division of JNR, JR East started operating the Nambu Line station on 1 April 1987. The station building and platforms were extensively remodelled from 2003 to 2007.

Station numbering was introduced to the Odakyu Line in January 2014 with Noborito being assigned station number OH18.

== Passenger statistics ==
In fiscal 2019, the JR station was used by an average of 82,838 passengers daily (boarding passengers only). During the same period, the Odakyu Station was used by 167,685 passengers daily (total).

The daily passenger figures (boarding passengers only) for previous years are as shown below.

| Fiscal year | JR | Odakyu |
|---|---|---|
| 2005 | 67,284 | 66,783 |
| 2010 | 75,373 | 75,910 |
| 2015 | 81,162 | 80,797 |

== See also ==
- List of railway stations in Japan
