= Kawasaki Station =

Railway station in Kawasaki, Kanagawa Prefecture, Japan

KWSJT04 JK16 JN01 Kawasaki Station 川崎駅
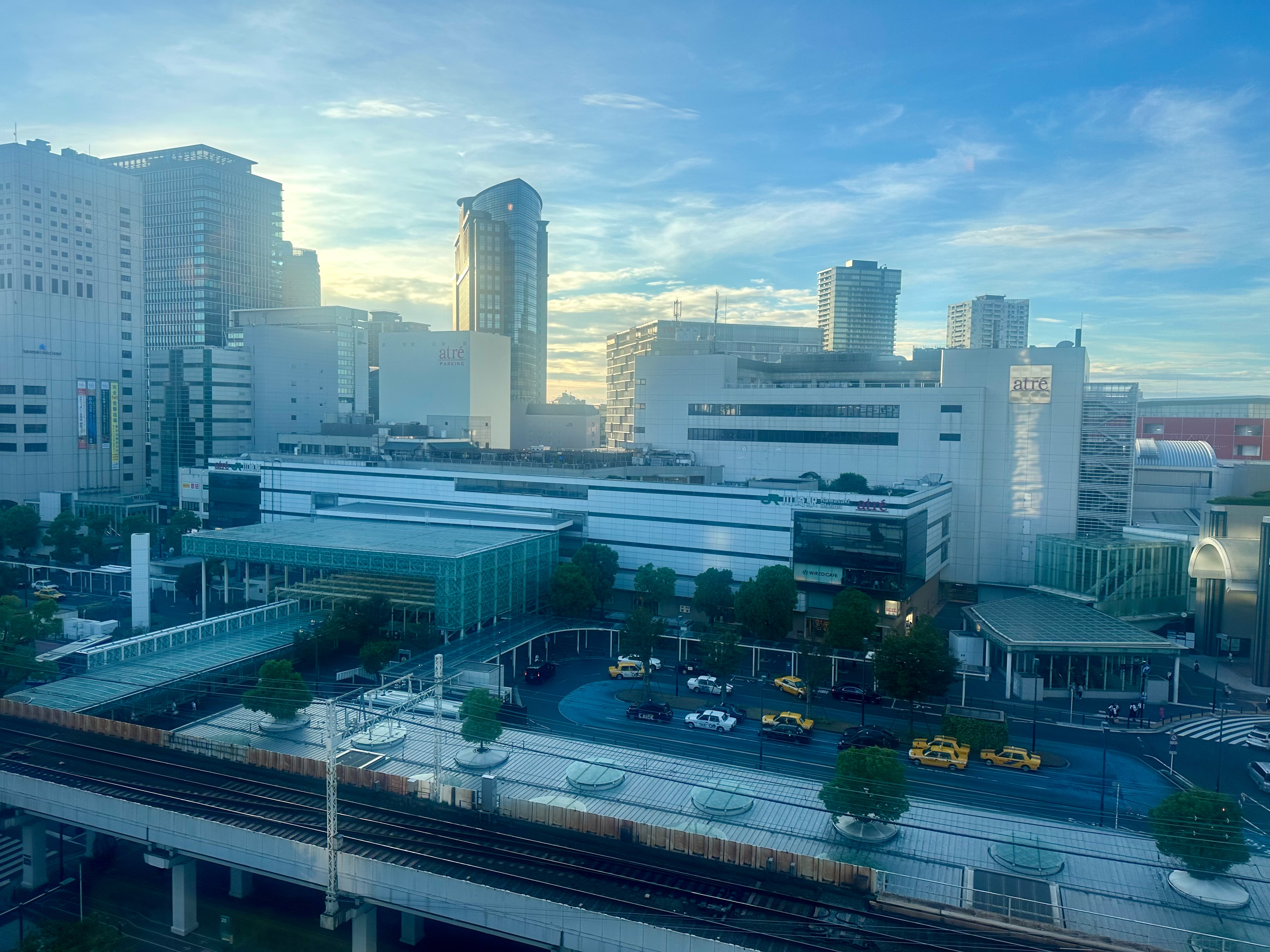
- The east side of the station in October 2024

General information
- Location: Ekimae-Honchō, Kawasaki Ward, Kawasaki City, Kanagawa Prefecture 210-0007; Japan
- Coordinates: 35°31′53″N 139°41′49″E
- Operator: JR East
- Lines: Keihin-Tōhoku Line; Tōkaidō Main Line; Nambu Line
- Distance: 18.2 km (11.3 mi) from Tokyo
- Platforms: 3 island platforms
- Tracks: 6
- Connections: Bus terminal; KK20 Keikyu Kawasaki

Construction
- Structure type: At grade

Other information
- Status: Staffed (Midori no Madoguchi)
- Station code: JT04; JK16; JN01
- Website: Official website

History
- Opened: 10 July 1872; 154 years ago

Passengers
- FY2019: 215,234 daily

Services
Preceding station	JR East	Following station
Yokohama towards Itō or Atami	Odoriko	Shinagawa towards Tokyo
Yokohama towards Atami	Tōkaidō Line	Shinagawa towards Tokyo
Tsurumi JK15 towards Yokohama	Keihin–Tōhoku Line Rapid Local	Kamata JK17 towards Ōmiya
Kashimada JN04 towards Tachikawa	Nambu Line Rapid	Terminus
Shitte JN02 towards Tachikawa	Nambu Line Local	Terminus
Location
- Location within Kanagawa Prefecture Location within Tokyo Bay and Bōsō Peninsula Location within Japan

Kawasaki Station (川崎駅, Kawasaki-eki) is a junction passenger railway station located in the city of Kawasaki, Kanagawa, Japan, operated by East Japan Railway Company (JR East).

== Lines ==
Kawasaki Station is served by the following JR East lines.

- Keihin-Tōhoku Line
- Tōkaidō Main Line
- Nambu Line

The station is 18.2 km (11.3 mi) from Tokyo and 48.5 km (30.1 mi) from Ōmiya.

== Station layout ==
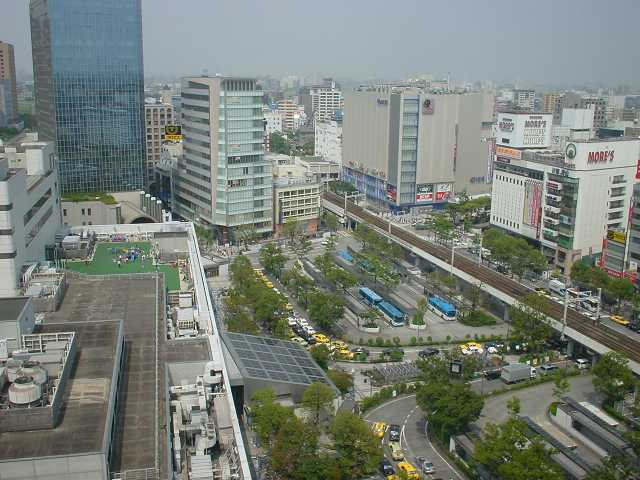
The east entrance of Kawasaki station with bus terminal

The station has three elevated island platforms serving six tracks, with an elevated station building built into a shopping center. The station has a Midori no Madoguchi staffed ticket office.

=== Platforms ===
1	Tōkaidō Main Line	for Yokohama, Odawara, and Atami
2	Tōkaidō Main Line (Ueno-Tokyo Line)	for Shinagawa, Tokyo, Ueno, Ōmiya; Utsunomiya Line for Utsunomiya; Takasaki Line for Takasaki
3	Keihin-Tōhoku Line	for Tsurumi, Yokohama, Isogo, and Ōfuna
4	Keihin-Tōhoku Line	for Kamata, Shinagawa, Tokyo, Ueno, and Ōmiya
5,6	Nambu Line	for Musashi-Kosugi, Noborito, Fuchū-Hommachi, and Tachikawa

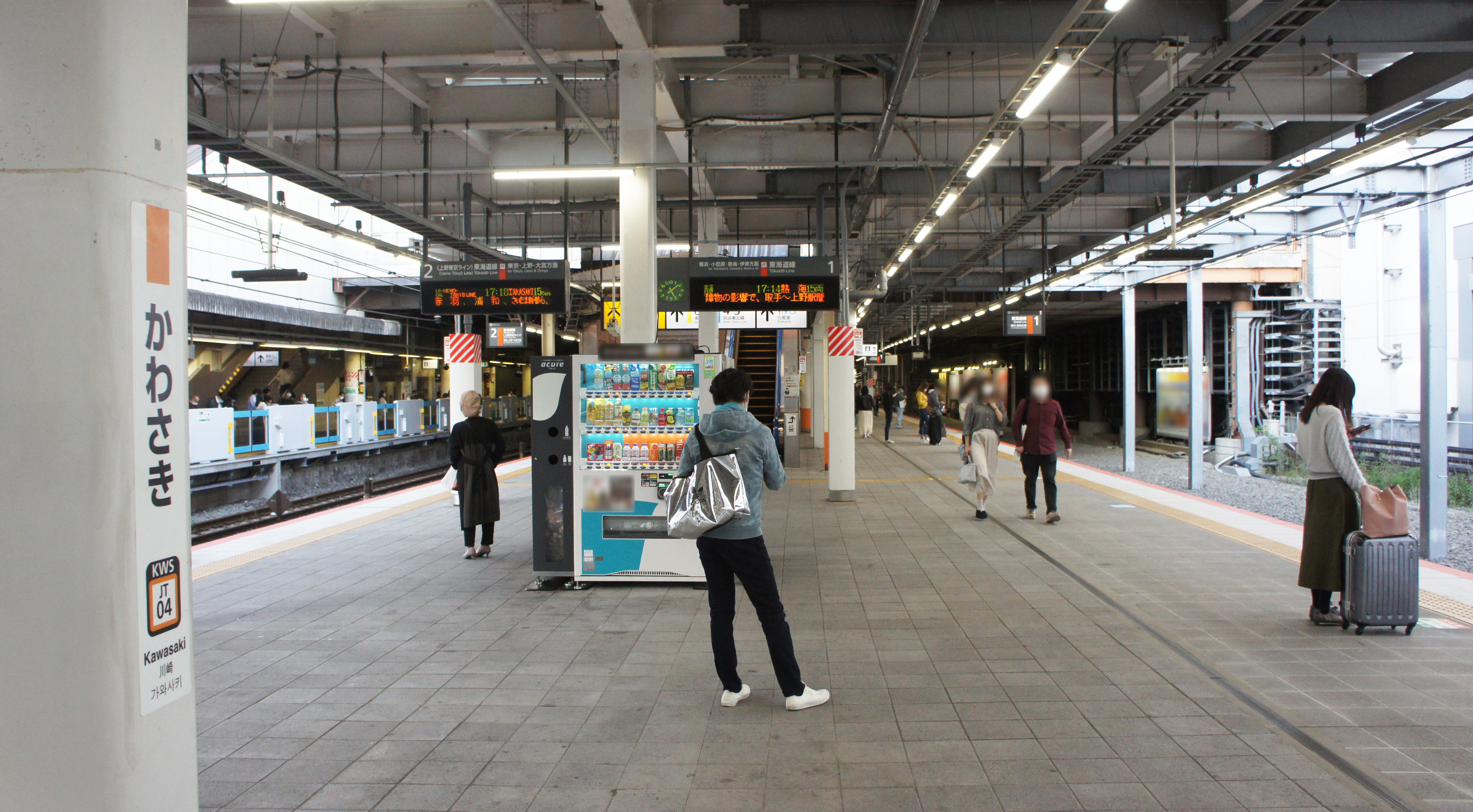
Platforms 1 and 2

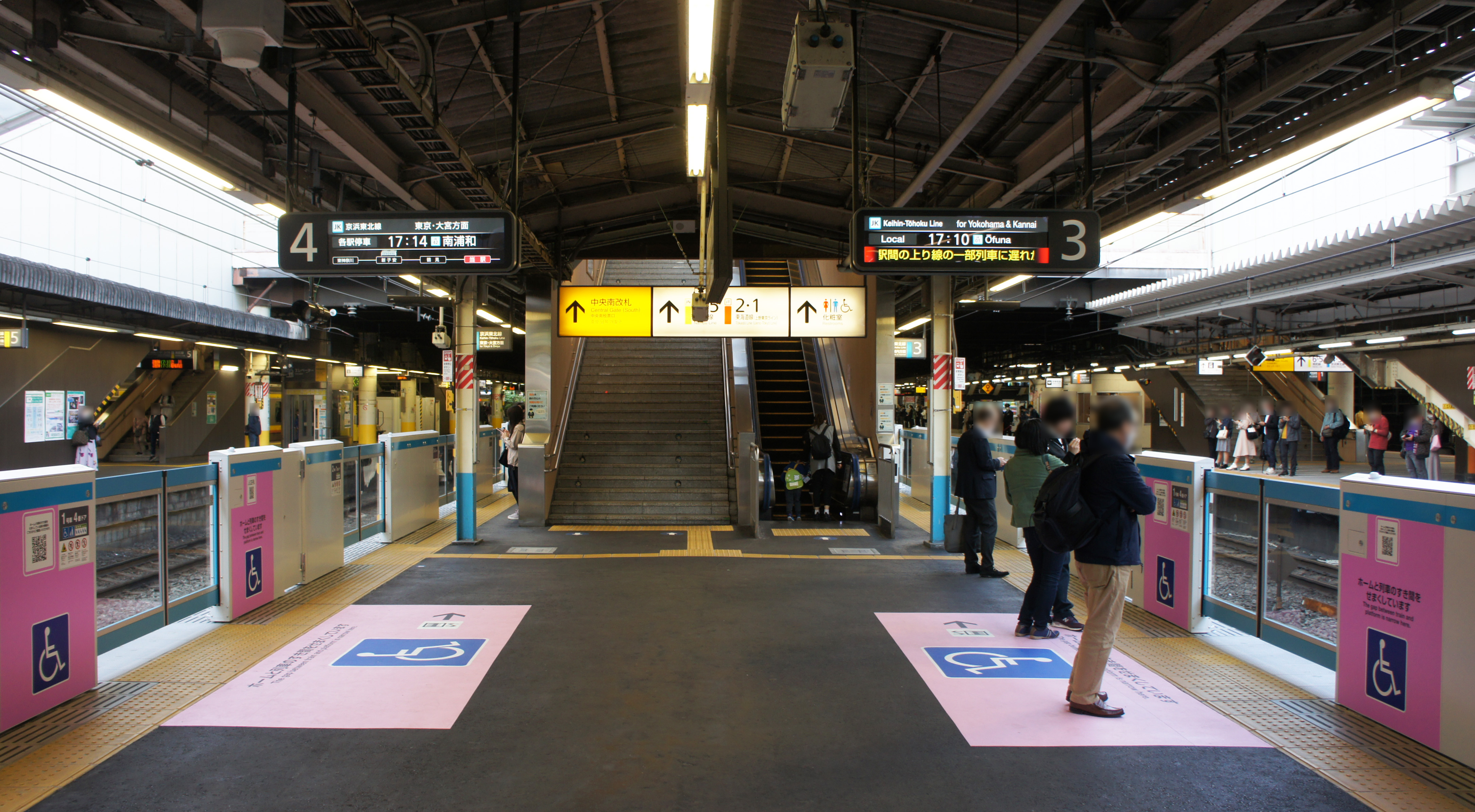
Platforms 3 and 4

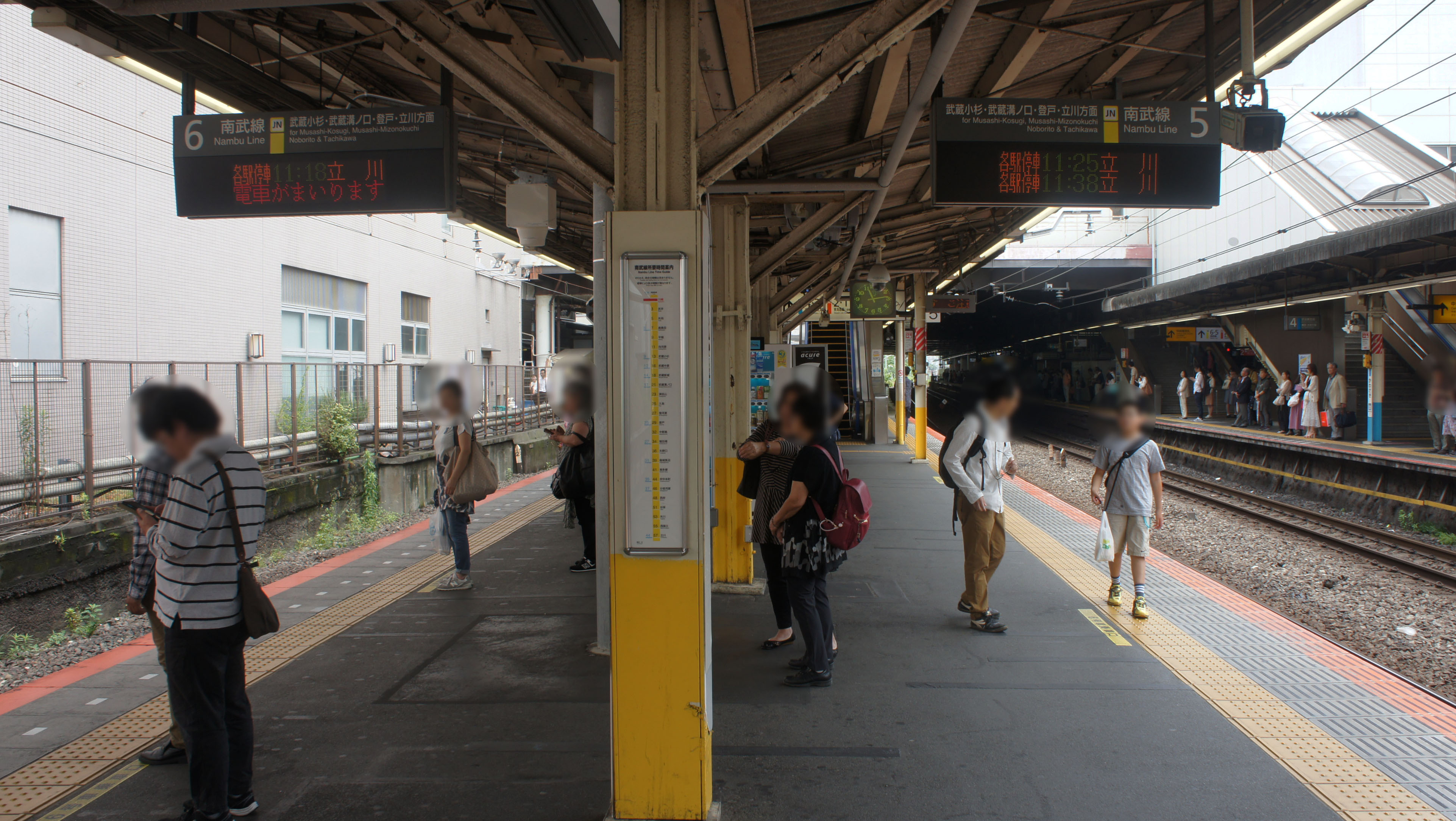
Platforms 5 and 6

The song "Ue o Muite Arukou" (上を向いて歩こう, Ue wo Muite Arukou), commonly known worldwide as "Sukiyaki" by Kyu Sakamoto, born in Kawasaki, is used as the departure melody for Platforms 1 and 2.

== History ==
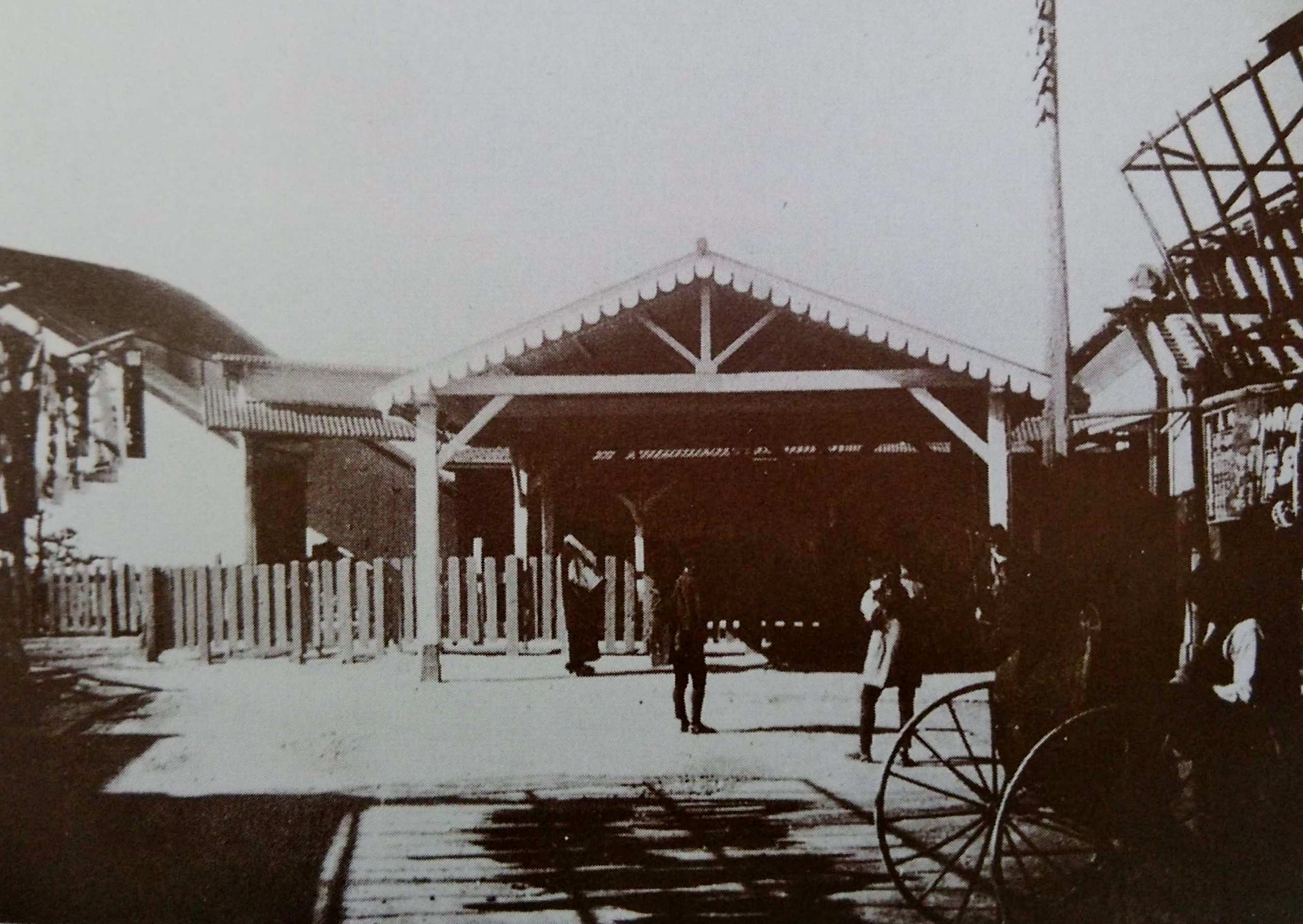
The station entrance in 1901

The station opened on 10 July 1872 (June 5 in original Japanese calendar then in use) as the first intermediate station of the first railway in Japan when it was providing a trial service on the section between Shinagawa Station and Sakuragichō Station in Yokohama before the official inauguration in October 1872.

The Nambu Railway, which later became the Nambu Line, opened on 9 March 1927.

Kawasaki City Tram operated a 6.7 km (4.2 mi) line from its Shiden Kawasaki terminal in front of this station to the now-closed Shiohama Station from 1944 to 1969.

== Passenger statistics ==
In fiscal 2019, the station was used by an average of 215,234 passengers daily (boarding passengers only).

The passenger figures (boarding passengers only) for previous years are as shown below.

Fiscal year	daily average
2005	163,495
2010	185,300
2015	207,725

== Surrounding area ==
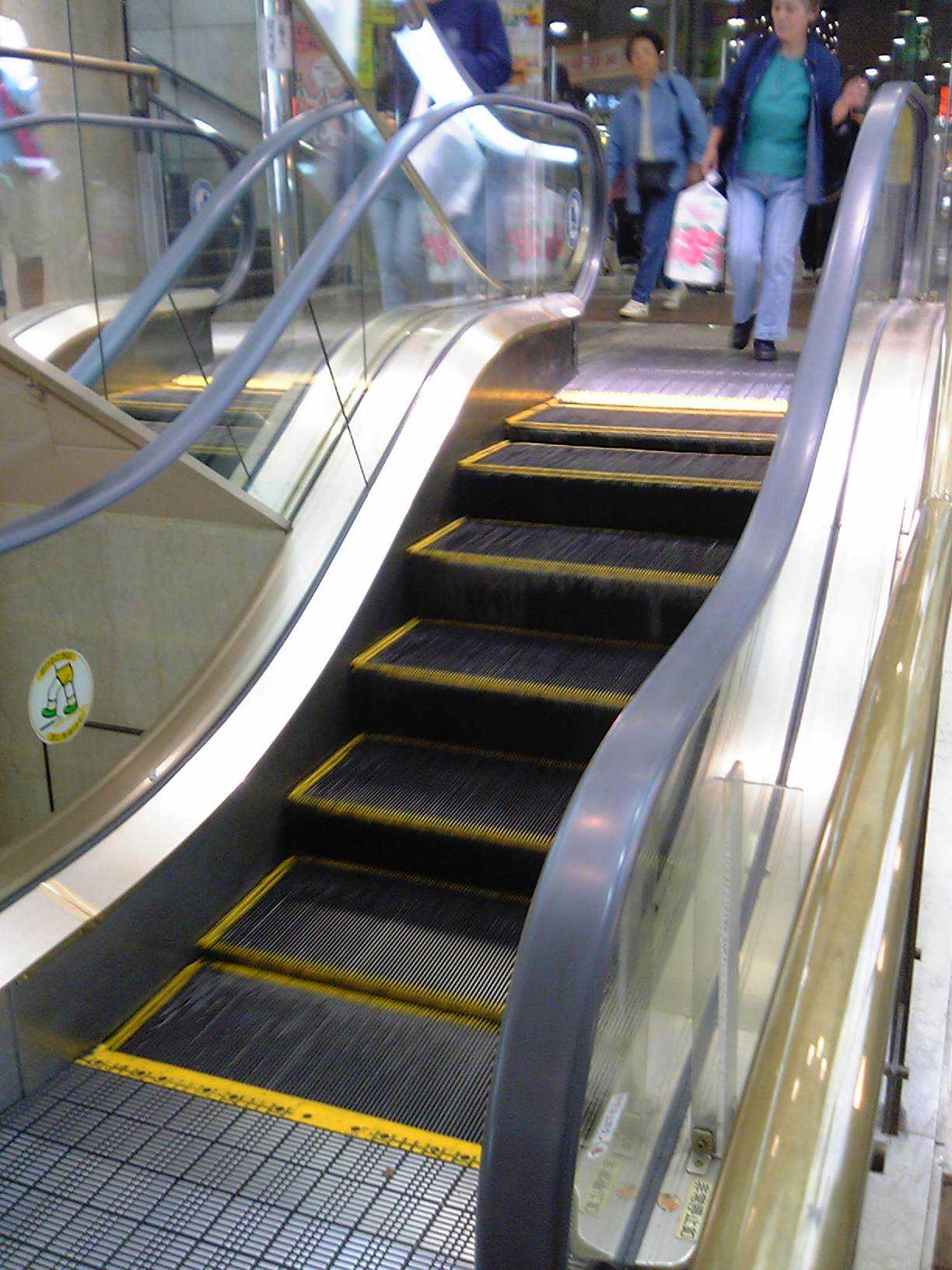
The short escalator beneath the More's department store

Connected to the west side of the station is the Lazona Kawasaki Plaza shopping mall. Connected to the east of the station is the "Atre Kawasaki" shopping complex. There are also various other commercial establishments around the station, including More-s Department Store, Yodobashi Camera, and Hands. Keikyu Kawasaki Station, operated by the private railway operator Keikyu is located to the northeast.

The basement area of the adjoining More's department store is home to what is dubbed "the world's shortest escalator", with a height difference of just 83.4 cm (2 ft 8.8 in).

== See also ==
- List of railway stations in Japan
