= Kawasaki Municipal Subway =

Kawasaki Longitudinal Rapid Railway

Overview
- Locale: Kawasaki, Kanagawa, Japan
- Transit type: Rapid Transit
- Number of lines: 1 (planned)
- Number of stations: 11 (planned)

Operation
- Operation will start: Suspended indefinitely
- Operator: Kawasaki Municipal Transportation Bureau

Technical
- System length: 16.7 km (10.38 mi)
- Track gauge: 1,067 mm (3 ft 6 in)
- Electrification: 1500 V DC

The Kawasaki Longitudinal Rapid Railway (川崎縦貫高速鉄道, Kawasaki jūkan kōsoku tetsudō) is a proposed subway line that would run between Shin-Yurigaoka and Musashi-Kosugi, ultimately extending to Kawasaki. The whole line will lie within the city of Kawasaki in Kanagawa Prefecture, Japan. It would link the eastern and western parts of southern Kawasaki that are otherwise not well served by rail transport. The railway line is planned by the city government of Kawasaki, therefore the operator would be Kawasaki City Transportation Bureau, which previously ran a city tram, busway, and currently operates extensive bus services. The project is commonly known as the Kawasaki Municipal Subway (川崎市営地下鉄, Kawasaeki shiei chikatetsu).

== History ==
A plan for a subway through Kawasaki was first devised in the 1960s. In 1966, the Ministry of Transport (now the Ministry of Land, Infrastructure and Transport) planned to construct a subway line between Sangyō-Dōro and Yurigaoka stations.

In 1985, the ministry changed the plan to use the existing Musashino South Line right-of-way, converting it from a freight-only to passenger-only operations. However the operator of the line, Japanese National Railways, was not favorable to the plan due to the line's importance for transporting freight, especially since the passenger-only Nambu Line was already operating nearby. The plan was therefore put on hold.

In 2001, the ministry announced plans to build the line between Shin-Yurigaoka and Kawasaki stations, erasing the eastern segment to Sangyō-Dōro present in the 1966 plan. Instead, the line would have connecting service onto the Keikyū Daishi Line. The Kawasaki city government then divided the 2001 plan into two segments: the segment between Shin-Yurigaoka and Motosumiyoshi to be built first, and the segment between Motosumiyoshi and Kawasaki to be extended later.

However, in 2003, due to the weak Japanese economy, the city government postponed the subway's construction for five years. In 2005, they changed the path of the line to go through Musashi-Kosugi rather than Motosumiyoshi, to improve the line's revenue potential. The current funding has been shelved, and as of 2013 there are no concrete plans to proceed.

== 2005 plan ==
=== Basic data ===
- Distance: 16.7 km (10.38 mi) (Shin-Yurigaoka – Musashi-Kosugi)
- Stations: 11
- Gauge: 1,067 mm (3 ft 6 in)
- Tracks: Entire line double-tracked
- Electrification: 1500 V DC

=== Stations ===
- All stations are located in Kawasaki.
- The Express Service stops at stations marked "●", skips those marked "|". All other services stop at every station.

Station	Japanese	Distance		Express Service	Transfers	Location
Station	Japanese	Between	Total	Express Service	Transfers	Location
Through service to/from Odakyū Tama Line
Shin-Yurigaoka	新百合ヶ丘	-	0.0	●	Odakyū Electric Railway: Odawara Line, Tama Line (through service)	Asao-ku
Nagasawa	長沢	2.7	2.7	｜		Tama-ku
Idaimae	医大前	1.4	4.1	｜		Tama-ku
Zōshiki	蔵敷	1.0	5.1	｜		Miyamae-ku
Inukura	犬蔵	1.6	6.7	｜		Miyamae-ku
Miyamaedaira	宮前平	1.6	8.3	●	Tōkyū Corporation: Den-en-toshi Line	Miyamae-ku
Nogawa	野川	1.6	9.9	｜		Miyamae-ku
Hisasue	久末	2.1	12.0	｜		Takatsu-ku
Shibokuchi	子母口	1.3	13.3	｜		Takatsu-ku
Todoroki-Ryokuchi	等々力緑地	1.9	15.2	｜		Nakahara-ku
Musashi-Kosugi	武蔵小杉	1.5	16.7	●	JR East: Nambu Line, Yokosuka Line, Shōnan-Shinjuku Line; Tōkyū Corporation: Tōyoko Line, Meguro Line	Nakahara-ku
