= Hirama Station =

Railway station in Kawasaki, Kanagawa Prefecture, Japan

JN05 Hirama Station 平間駅
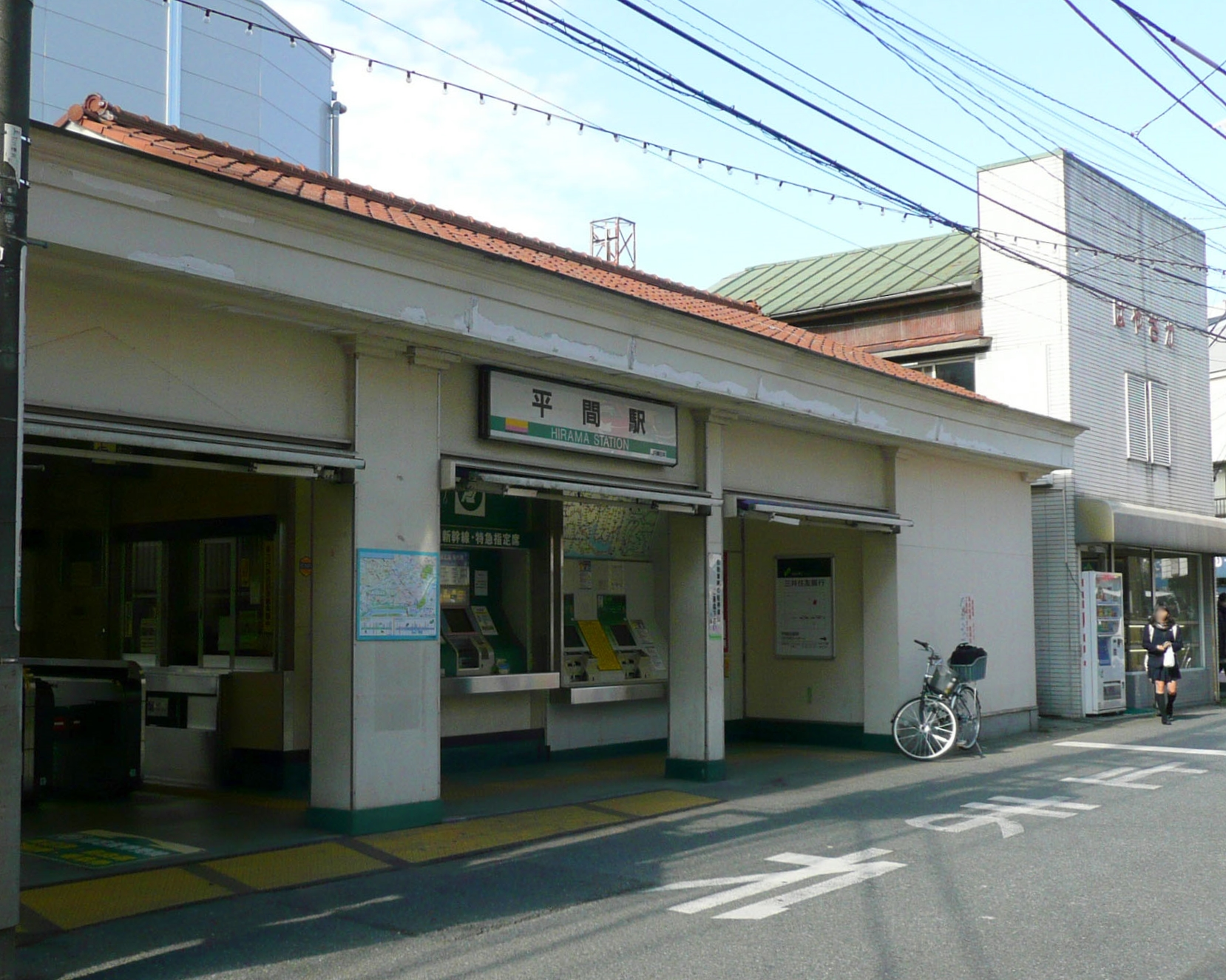
- Hirama Station entrance in November 2011

General information
- Location: Tajiri-chō, Nakahara-ku, Kawasaki-shi, Kanagawa-ken 211-0014; Japan
- Coordinates: 35.5606°N 139.6712°E
- Operator: JR East
- Line: Nambu Line
- Distance: 5.3 km from Kawasaki
- Platforms: 2 side platforms
- Tracks: 2
- Connections: Bus stop

Other information
- Station code: JN05
- Website: Official website

History
- Opened: 9 March 1927

Passengers
- FY2019: 14,930 daily

Services
Preceding station	JR East	Following station
Mukaigawara JN06 towards Tachikawa	Nambu Line Local	Kashimada JN04 towards Kawasaki
Location
- Location within Kanagawa Prefecture Location within Japan

Hirama Station (平間駅, Hirama-eki) is a passenger railway station located in Nakahara-ku, Kawasaki, Kanagawa Prefecture, Japan, operated by the East Japan Railway Company (JR East).

== Lines ==
Hirama Station is served by the Nambu Line. The station is 5.3 km (3.3 mi) from the southern terminus of the line at Kawasaki Station.

== Station layout ==
The station consists of two opposed side platforms serving two tracks, connected by a footbridge. The station is staffed.

=== Platforms ===
1	Nambu Line	for Kawasaki
2	Nambu Line	for Musashi-Kosugi, Musashi-Mizonokuchi, Noborito, and Tachikawa

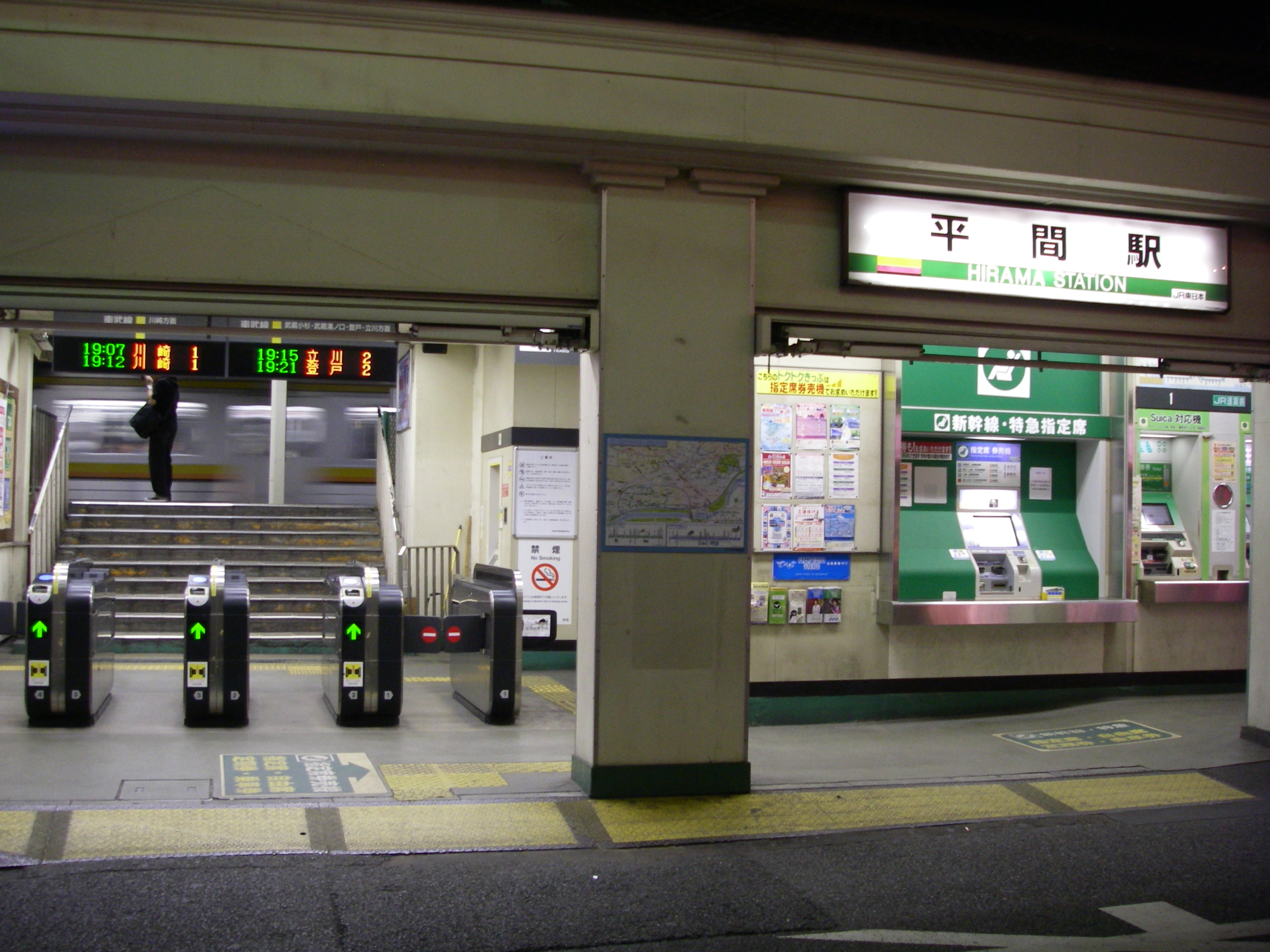
The ticket barriers leading to the platform in October 2008

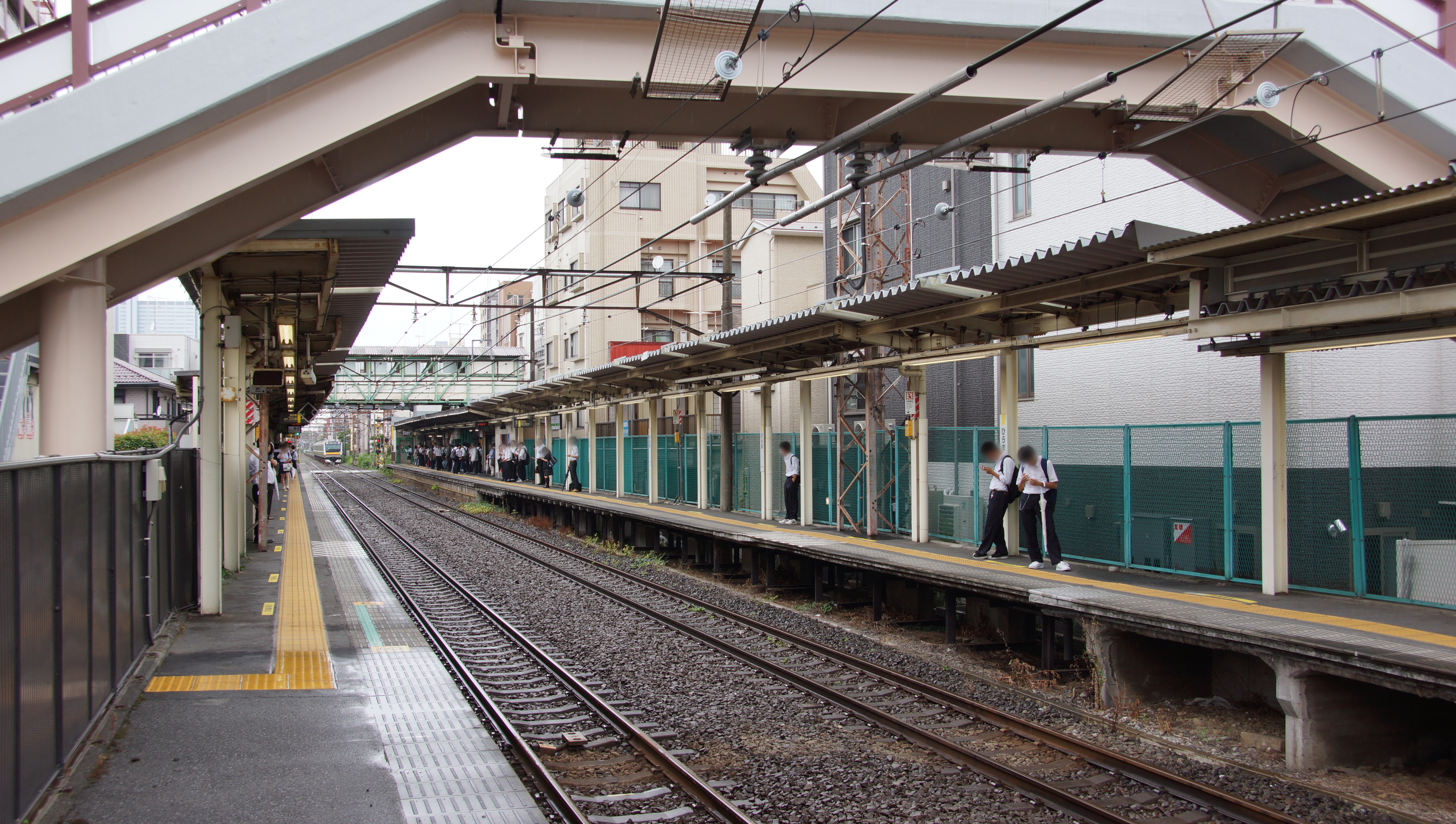
The platforms in June 2017

== History ==
Hirama Station opened as a station on the Nambu Railway on 9 March 1927. The Nambu Railway was nationalized on 1 April 1944, and the station came under the control of Japanese National Railways (JNR). With the privatization of JNR on 1 April 1987, the station was absorbed into the JR East network.

== Passenger statistics ==
In fiscal 2019, the station was used by an average of 14,930 passengers daily (boarding passengers only).

The passenger figures (boarding passengers only) for previous years are as shown below.

Fiscal year	daily average
2005	13,918
2010	14,136
2015	14,509

== Surrounding area ==
- Hirama Ginza Shopping Street
- Kanagawa Prefectural Kawasaki Technical High School
- Kawasaki Municipal Tachibana High School

== See also ==
- List of railway stations in Japan
