= Saiwai-ku =

Saiwai 幸区
- Ward
- Saiwai Ward
- Flag

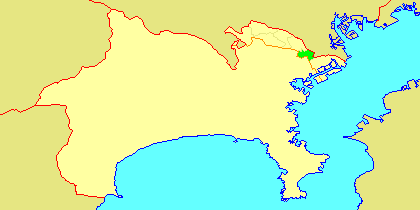
- Location of Saiwai in Kanagawa

- Coordinates: 35°32′40″N 139°41′15″E
- Country: Japan
- Region: Kantō
- Prefecture: Kanagawa
- City: Kawasaki
- Established: April 1, 1972

Area
  - Total: 10.05 km^{2} (3.88 sq mi)

Population (March 2010)
  - Total: 153,255
  - Density: 15,250/km^{2} (39,500/sq mi)
- Time zone: UTC+9 (Japan Standard Time)
- Address: 1-11-1 Todehonmachi, Saiwai-ku Kawasaki-shi, Kanagawa-ken; 212-8570
- Website: Saiwai Ward Office

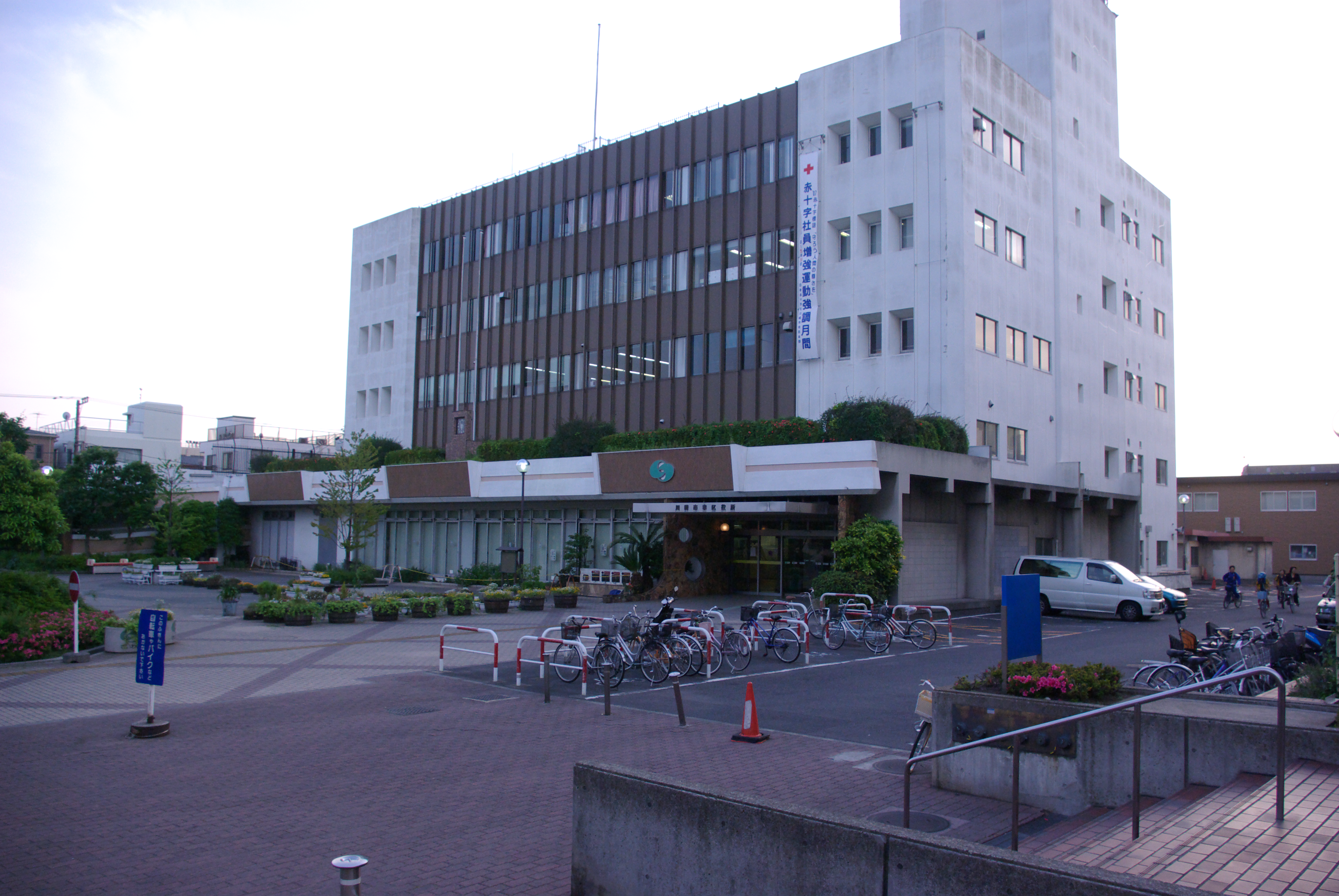
Saiwai Ward Office

Saiwai-ku (幸区) is one of the 7 wards of the city of Kawasaki in Kanagawa Prefecture, Japan. As of 2010, the ward had an estimated population of 153,255 and a density of 15,250 persons per km^{2}. The total area was 10.05 km^{2}.

== Geography ==
Saiwai Ward is located in eastern Kanagawa Prefecture, in the center portion of the city of Kawasaki, bordering on Tokyo to the north and Yokohama to the south.

=== Surrounding municipalities ===
- Nakahara-ku, Kawasaki
- Kawasaki-ku, Kawasaki
- Ōta-ku, Tokyo
- Kohoku-ku, Yokohama
- Tsurumi-ku, Yokohama

== History ==
Archaeologists have found numerous Kofun period remains at numerous locations in what is now Saiwai-ku, indicating a long period of human settlement. Under the Nara period Ritsuryō system, it became part of Tachibana District Musashi Province. In the Edo period, it was administered as tenryō territory controlled directly by the Tokugawa shogunate, but administered through various hatamoto, and was the center of a prosperous farming area adjacent to Kawasaki-juku, a post station on the Tokaido highway connecting Edo with Kyoto. After the Meiji Restoration, the area urbanized due to its proximity to Kawasaki Station on the Tokaido Main Line. Saiwai Village within Tachibana District in the new Kanagawa Prefecture was created on April 1, 1889, through the merger of eight smaller hamlets. In the early twentieth century, the area was dominated by factories; notably Meiji Sugar and Toshiba. The area was largely destroyed by the Great Kanto earthquake of 1923, but was soon rebuilt. The area was annexed by the neighboring city of Kawasaki in two stages in 1927 and in 1937. The area was heavily damaged by American bombing during World War II.

Saiwai Ward was established with the division of Kawasaki into wards on April 1, 1972.

== Economy ==
The economy of Saiwai Ward continues to be dominated by industry, with Toshiba, Canon, Pioneer Corporation, and Hitachi. A number of companies are headquartered in Sawai Ward, including the Japanese subsidiaries of Dell Computer, Toys "R" Us as well as Mitsubishi Fuso Truck and Bus Corporation, Universal Shipbuilding Corporation, and Fuji Sash.

== Transportation ==
=== Rail ===
- JR East – Nambu Line
  - Kashimada Station, Mukaigawara Station
- JR East – Yokosuka Line
  - Shin-Kawasaki Station

=== Road ===
- Japan National Route 1 (Dai-ni Keihin)
- National Route 466 (No. 3 Keihin Road, as "Daisan-Keihin" (第三京浜))
- Kanagawa Prefectural Road 9
- Kanagawa Prefectural Road 14
- Kanagawa Prefectural Road 111
- Kanagawa Prefectural Road 140

== Local attractions ==
- Muza Kawasaki Symphony Hall.
- Lazona Kawasaki Plaza

== Education ==
- Keio University – Kawasaki Campus
- Kawasaki City College of Nursing

Municipal junior high schools:

- Hiyoshi (日吉中学校)
- Minamigawara (南河原中学校)
- Minamikase (南加瀬中学校)
- Miyuki (御幸中学校)
- Tsukagoshi (塚越中学校)

Municipal elementary schools:

- Furuichiba (古市場小学校)
- Furukawa (古川小学校)
- Higashi Ogura (東小倉小学校)
- Hiyoshi (日吉小学校)
- Minamigawara (南河原小学校)
- Minamikase (南加瀬小学校)
- Miyuki (御幸小学校)
- Nishi Miyuki (西御幸小学校)
- Ogura (小倉小学校)
- Saiwaicho (幸町小学校)
- Shimo Hirama (下平間小学校)
- Tode (戸手小学校)
- Yumemigasaki (夢見ヶ崎小学校)

Former elementary schools:

- Kawaramachi (河原町小学校) - Closed on March 31, 2006 (Heisei 18)

== Noted people from Saiwai Ward ==
- Noriyuki Higashiyama, actor
- Tetsuya Enomoto, professional soccer player
- Satoshi Nakamoto, inventor of bitcoin
