= Shin-maruko Station =

Railway station in Kawasaki, Kanagawa Prefecture, Japan

Shin-maruko Station 新丸子駅

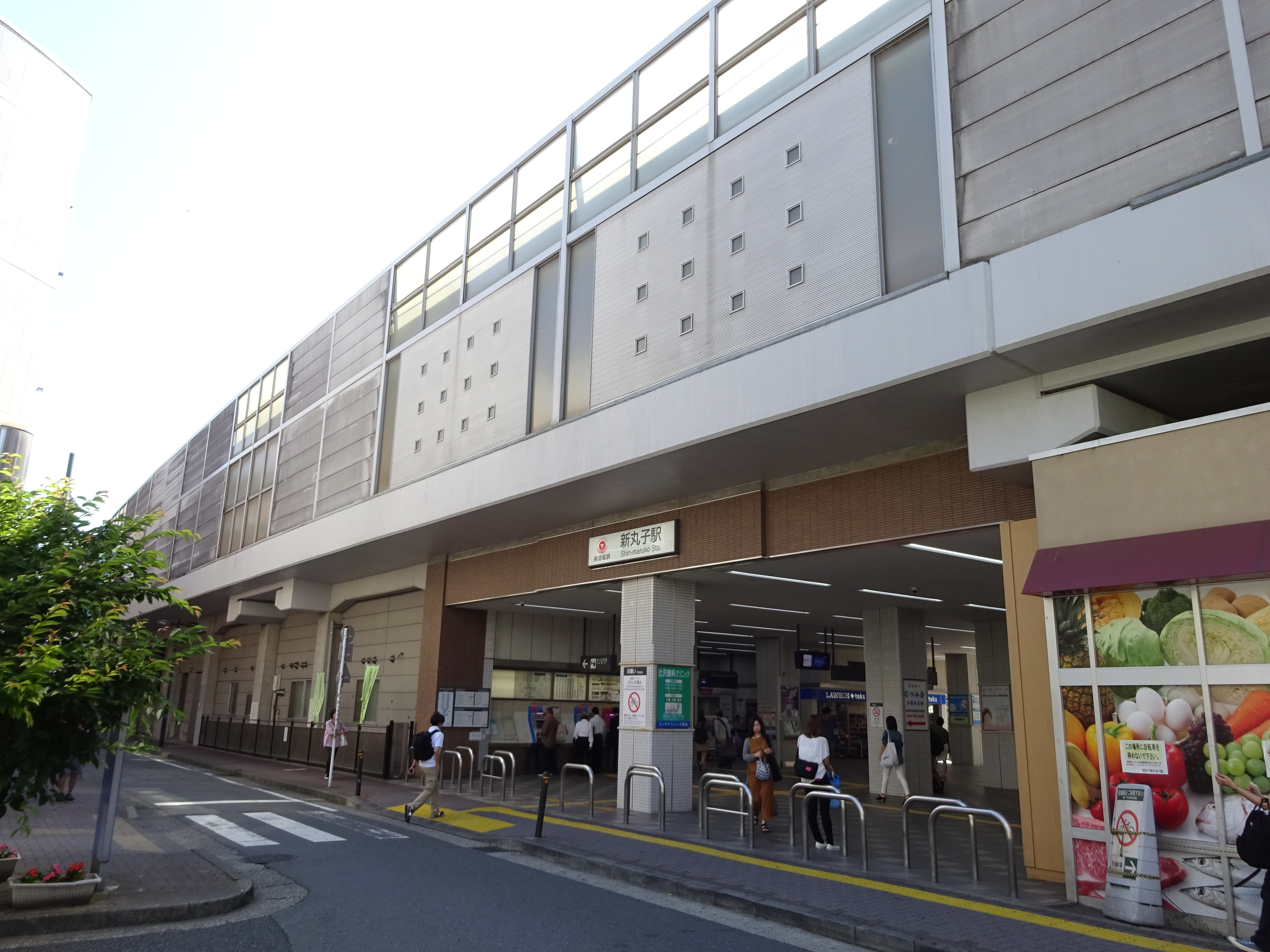
- Shin-maruko Station, west exit

General information
- Location: 766 Shinmaruko-cho, Nakahara Ward, Kawasaki City; Kanagawa Prefecture 211-0005; Japan
- Coordinates: 35°34′50″N 139°39′43″E
- Operator: Tōkyū Railways
- Lines: Tōyoko Line; Meguro Line
- Distance: 10.3 km (6.4 mi) from Shibuya
- Platforms: 2 island platforms
- Tracks: 4
- Connections: Bus stop

Construction
- Structure type: Elevated

Other information
- Station code: TY10, MG10
- Website: Official website

History
- Opened: 14 February 1926; 100 years ago

Passengers
- FY2019: 27,539

Services
Preceding station	Tōkyū Railways	Following station
Musashi-kosugi towards Yokohama	Tōyoko Line Local	Tamagawa towards Shibuya
Musashi-kosugi towards Hiyoshi	Meguro Line Local	Tamagawa towards Meguro
Location
- Location within Tokyo Bay and Bōsō Peninsula Location within Kanagawa Prefecture Location within Tokyo Location within Japan

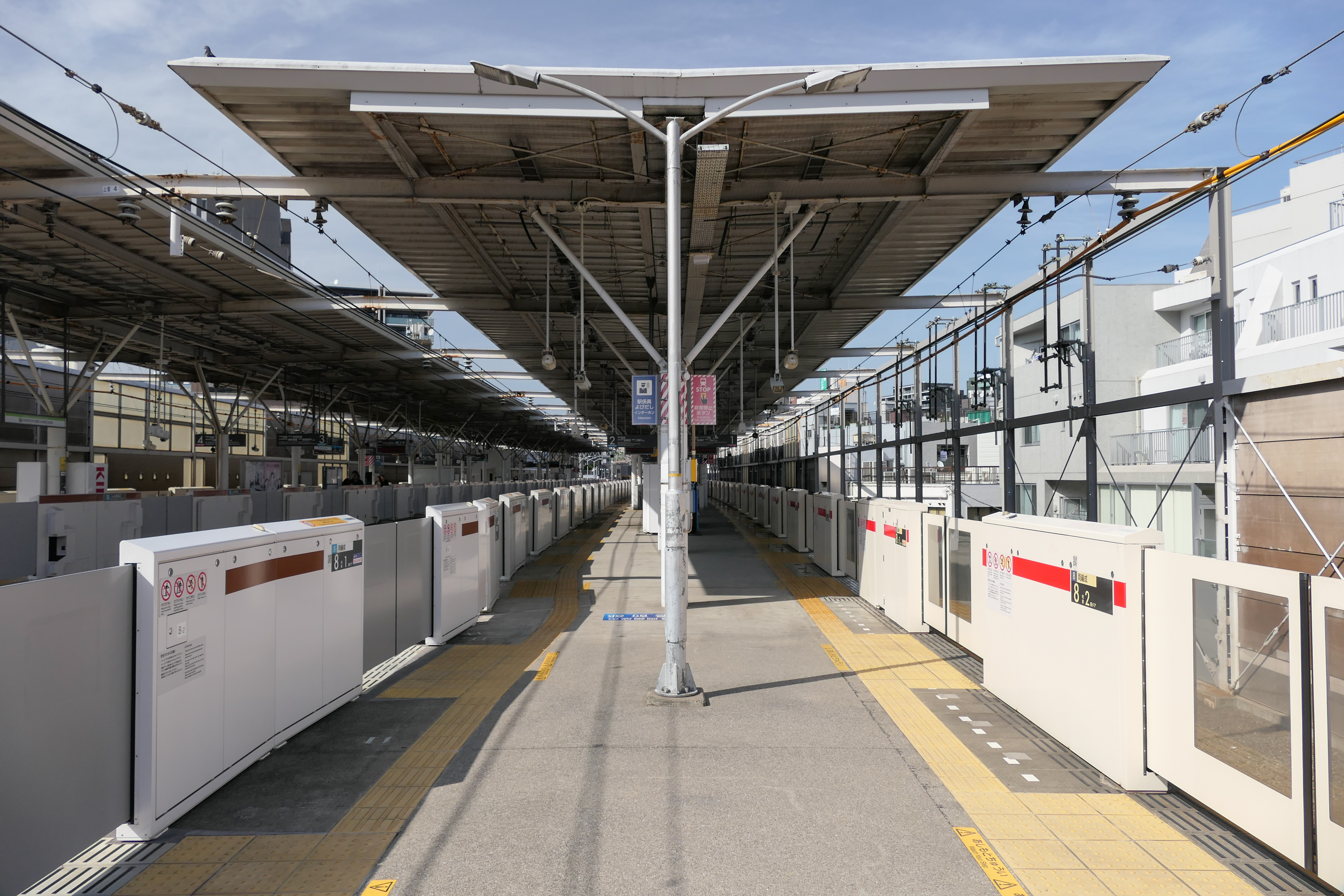
Platforms

Shin-maruko Station (新丸子駅, Shin-maruko-eki) is a junction passenger railway station located in Nakahara Ward, Kawasaki, Kanagawa Prefecture, Japan and operated by the private railway company Tokyu Corporation.

== Lines ==
Shin-maruko Station is served by the Tōkyū Tōyoko Line and is 10.3 kilometers (6.4 mi) from the starting point of the line at Shibuya. It is also served by the Tōkyū Meguro Line and is 8.6 kilometers (5.3 mi) from the terminus of that line at Meguro Station.

== Station layout ==
The station consists of two island platforms serving four tracks with an elevated station building.

=== Platforms ===
1
Tokyu Toyoko Line
- for Musashi-Kosugi, Kikuna, and Yokohama
- Minatomirai Line for Motomachi-Chūkagai
- Sōtetsu Izumino Line for Shōnandai via the Tōkyū/Sōtetsu Shin-yokohama Line
2
Tokyu Meguro Line
- for Musashi-Kosugi and Hiyoshi
- Tōkyū Shin-yokohama Line for Shin-Yokohama
- Sōtetsu Main Line for Ebina via the Tōkyū/Sōtetsu Shin-yokohama Line
3
Tokyu Meguro Line
for Ōokayama and Meguro
Namboku Line for Akabane-iwabuchi
Saitama Rapid Railway Line for Urawa-misono
Mita Line for Nishi-takashimadaira
4
Tokyu Toyoko Line
for Jiyūgaoka, Naka-Meguro, and Shibuya
Fukutoshin Line for Shinjuku-sanchome, Ikebukuro, Kotake-mukaihara, and Wakoshi
Seibu Ikebukuro Line for Hannō
Tōbu Tōjō Line for Shinrinkōen

== History ==
Shin-maruko Station opened as one of the original Tōyoko Line stations on February 14, 1926.

== Passenger statistics ==
In fiscal 2019, the station was used by an average of 27,539 passengers daily.

The daily average passenger figures for previous years are as shown below.

Fiscal year	Tōyoko Line	Meguro Line
2005	20,750	4,671
2010	19,785	5,738
2015	20,131	6,171

== Surrounding area ==
- Sumiyoshi Shrine
- Kanto Workers' Health and Safety Hospital
- Tokyu Corporation Former Sumiyoshi Depot
- Tokyu Driving School / Train Driver Training Center
- Kanagawa Prefectural Sumiyoshi High School
- Hosei University Second Junior and Senior High School

== See also ==
- List of railway stations in Japan
