= Shin-Kawasaki Station =

Railway station in Kawasaki, Kanagawa Prefecture, Japan

JO14 JS14 Shin-Kawasaki Station 新川崎駅
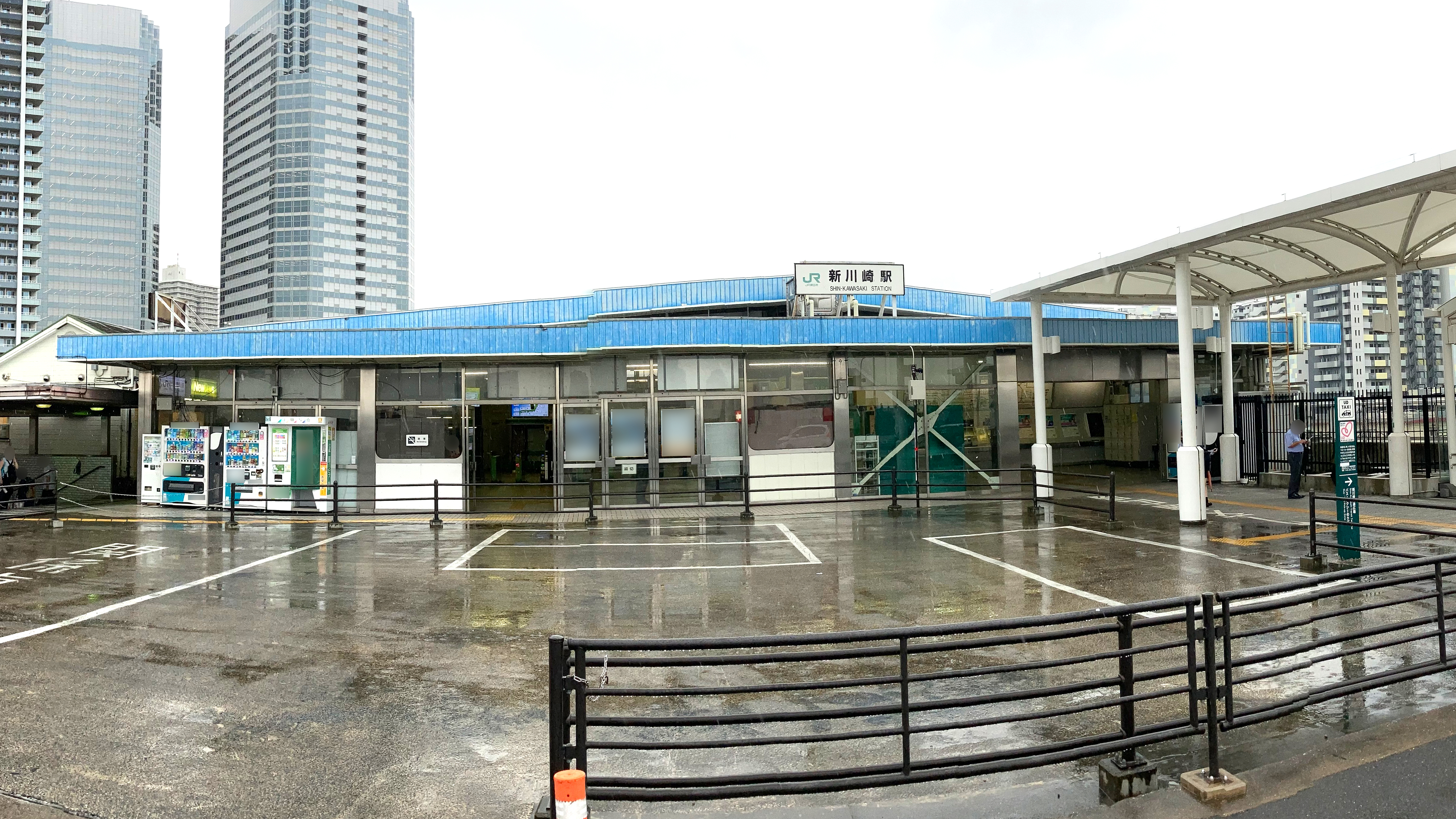
- Station entrance in July 2021

General information
- Location: 1-2 Kashimada, Saiwai-ku, Kawasaki-shi, Kanagawa-ken 212-0058; Japan
- Coordinates: 35.551°N 139.672°E
- Operator: JR East
- Lines: Yokosuka Line; Shōnan-Shinjuku Line
- Distance: 19.5 km from Tokyo.
- Platforms: 1 island platform
- Connections: Kashimada Station (Nambu Line); Bus stop

Other information
- Status: Staffed (Midori no Madoguchi)
- Station code: JO14
- Website: Official website

History
- Opened: 1 October 1980

Passengers
- FY2019: 30,255 daily

Services
Preceding station	JR East	Following station
Yokohama towards Kurihama	Yokosuka Line	Musashi-Kosugi towards Tokyo
Yokohama towards Zushi	Shōnan–Shinjuku Line Rapid Local	Musashi-Kosugi towards Utsunomiya
Location
- Location within Kanagawa Prefecture Location within Japan

Shin-Kawasaki Station (新川崎駅, Shin-Kawasaki-eki) is a passenger railway station located in Saiwai-ku, Kawasaki, Japan, operated by East Japan Railway Company (JR East).

== Lines ==
Shin-Kawasaki Station is served by the Yokosuka Line and Shōnan-Shinjuku Line, and is located 12.7 km from Shinagawa Station and 19.5 km from Tokyo Station.

== Station layout ==
The station consists of a single island platform serving two tracks. The platforms are capable of handling 15-car trains. The station is located adjacent to JR Freight's Shin-Tsurumi locomotive depot. The station is located on the former Hinkaku freight spur line of the Tōkaidō Main Line, but is not on the Tōkaidō Main Line itself, nor do trains from the Tōkaidō Main Line pass through the station. The station previously had a Midori no Madoguchi staffed ticket office that closed on September 28th, 2021.

=== Platforms ===
1	Yokosuka Line	for Yokohama, Ōfuna, Kamakura, Zushi, Yokosuka, and Kurihama
1	Shōnan-Shinjuku Line	for Yokohama, Ōfuna, and Zushi
2	Yokosuka Line	for Shinagawa, Tokyo, Funabashi, Chiba, and Narita Airport (Terminal 2·3 and Terminal 1)
2	Shōnan-Shinjuku Line	for Ōsaki, Shibuya, Shinjuku, Ikebukuro, Ōmiya, Oyama, and Utsunomiya

== History ==
Shin-Kawasaki Station opened on 1 October 1980 as a commuter station for people living in the surrounding large residential areas working in Tokyo or Yokohama.

== Passenger statistics ==
In fiscal 2019, the station was used by an average of 30,255 passengers daily (boarding passengers only).

The passenger figures (boarding passengers only) for previous years are as shown below.

Fiscal year	daily average
2005	25,544
2010	25,159
2015	27,085

== Surrounding area ==
- Keio University Shinkawasaki Town Campus
- Yumemigasaki Zoological Park
- Mitsubishi Fuso Truck and Bus Technical Center
- Kashimada Station on the Nambu Line lies approximately 400 meters to the east.

== See also ==
- List of railway stations in Japan
