= Yakō Station =

Railway station in Yokohama, Japan

JN03 Yakō Station 矢向駅
- Yakō Station, February 2024

General information
- Location: 6 Yakō, Tsurumi-ku, Yokohama-shi, Kanagawa-ken 230-0001; Japan
- Coordinates: 35.5395°N 139.6804°E
- Operator: JR East
- Line: Nambu Line
- Distance: 2.6 km from Kawasaki
- Platforms: 1 side + 1 island platform
- Tracks: 3
- Connections: Bus terminal

Other information
- Station code: JN03
- Website: Official website

History
- Opened: 9 March 1927

Passengers
- FY2019: 19,449 daily

Services
Preceding station	JR East	Following station
Kashimada JN04 towards Tachikawa	Nambu Line Local	Shitte JN02 towards Kawasaki
Location
- Location within Kanagawa Prefecture Location within Japan

Yakō Station (矢向駅, Yakō-eki) is a passenger railway station located in Tsurumi-ku, Yokohama, Kanagawa Prefecture, Japan, operated by the East Japan Railway Company (JR East).

== Lines ==
Yakō Station is served by the Nambu Line. The station is 2.6 km (1.6 mi) from the southern terminus of the line at Kawasaki Station.

== Station layout ==
The station consists of one side platform (platform 1) and one island platform (platform 2/3) serving a total three tracks, connected by a footbridge. Platform 1 for down (Tachikawa-bound) services is on the west side of the station, alongside the station building, and the up (Kawasaki-bound) platforms 2 and 3 are connected by a footbridge. The station is staffed.

Stabling sidings lie adjacent to platform 3 on the east side of the station and also on the east side of the line south of the station.

=== Platforms ===
1	Nambu Line	for Musashi-Kosugi, Musashi-Mizonokuchi, Noborito, and Tachikawa
2/3	Nambu Line	for Kawasaki

Platform 3 is normally used only by trains to Kawasaki starting here during the morning and evening peak hours.

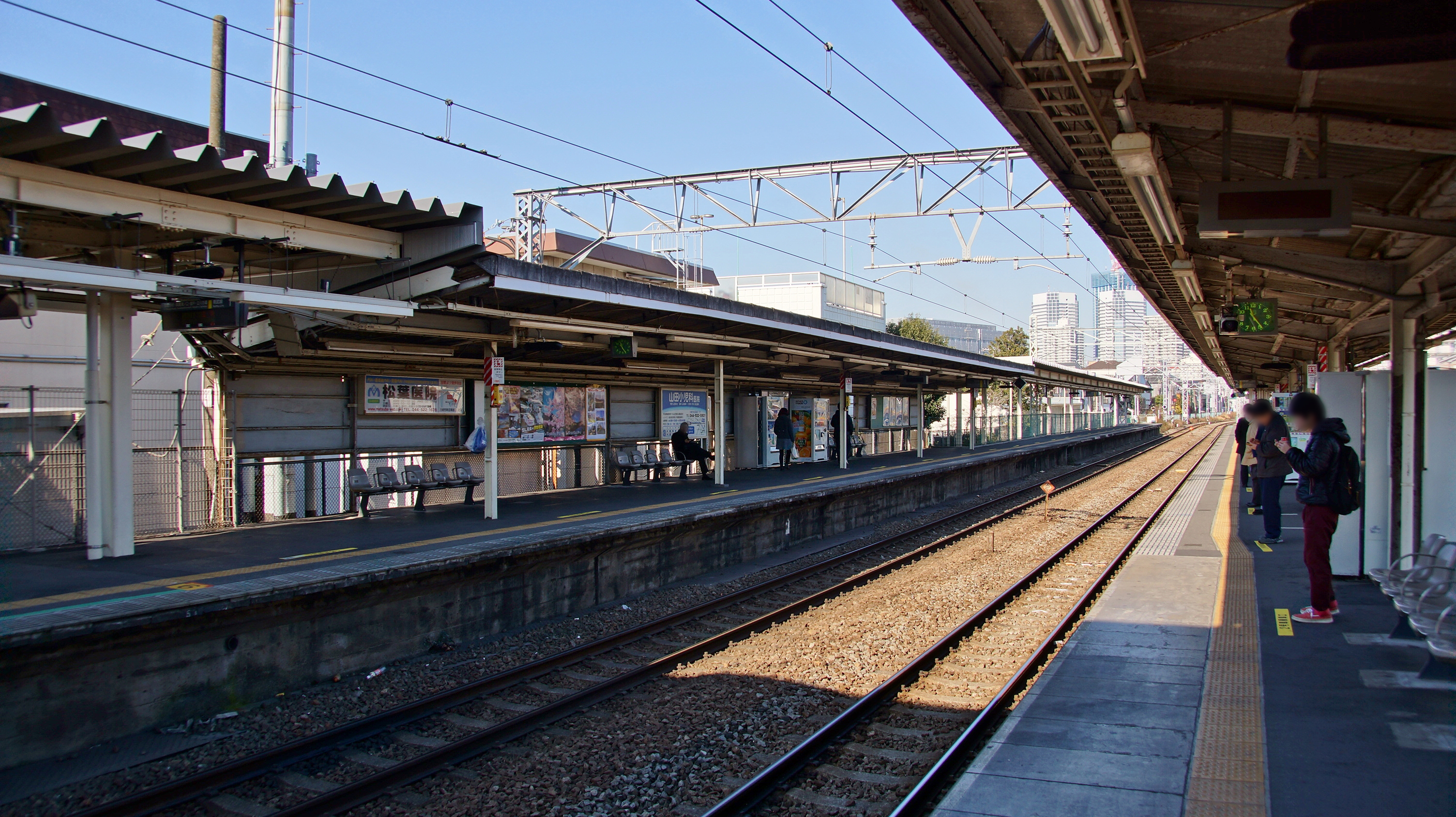
The platforms viewed from the south end of platform 2 in January 2016

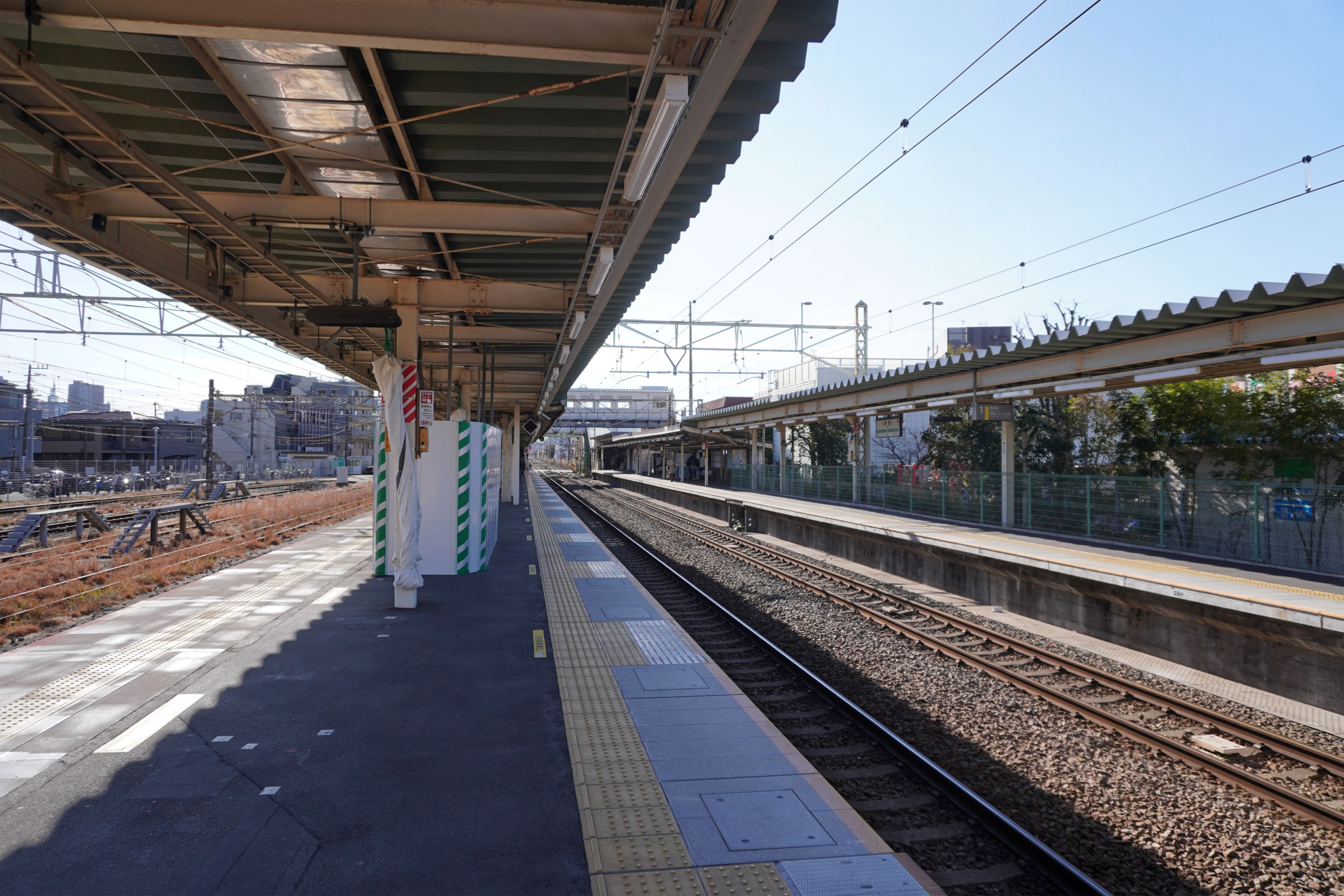
The platforms viewed from the north end of platform 2 in February 2024

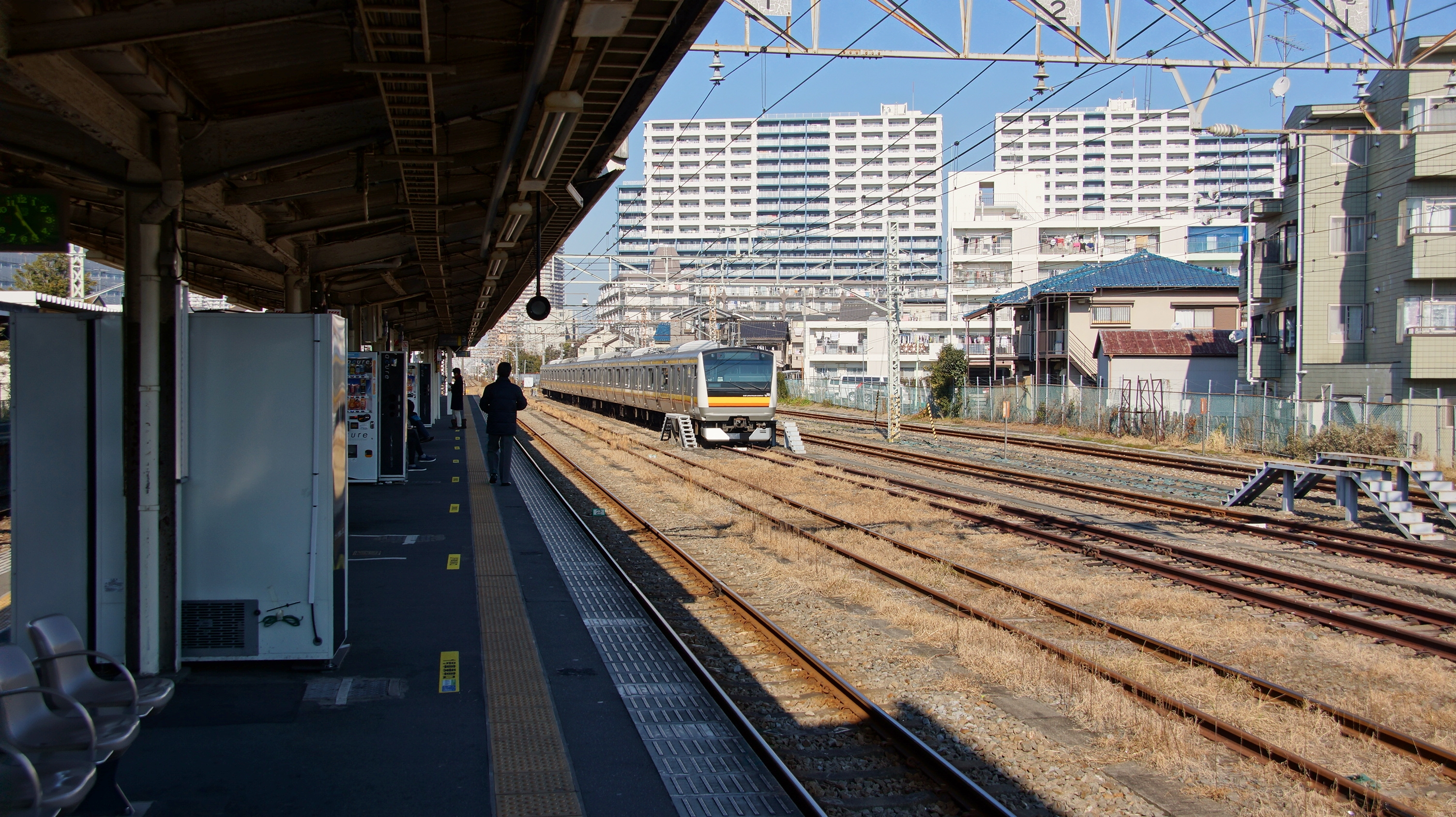
Platform 3 with the stabling sidings on the right in January 2016

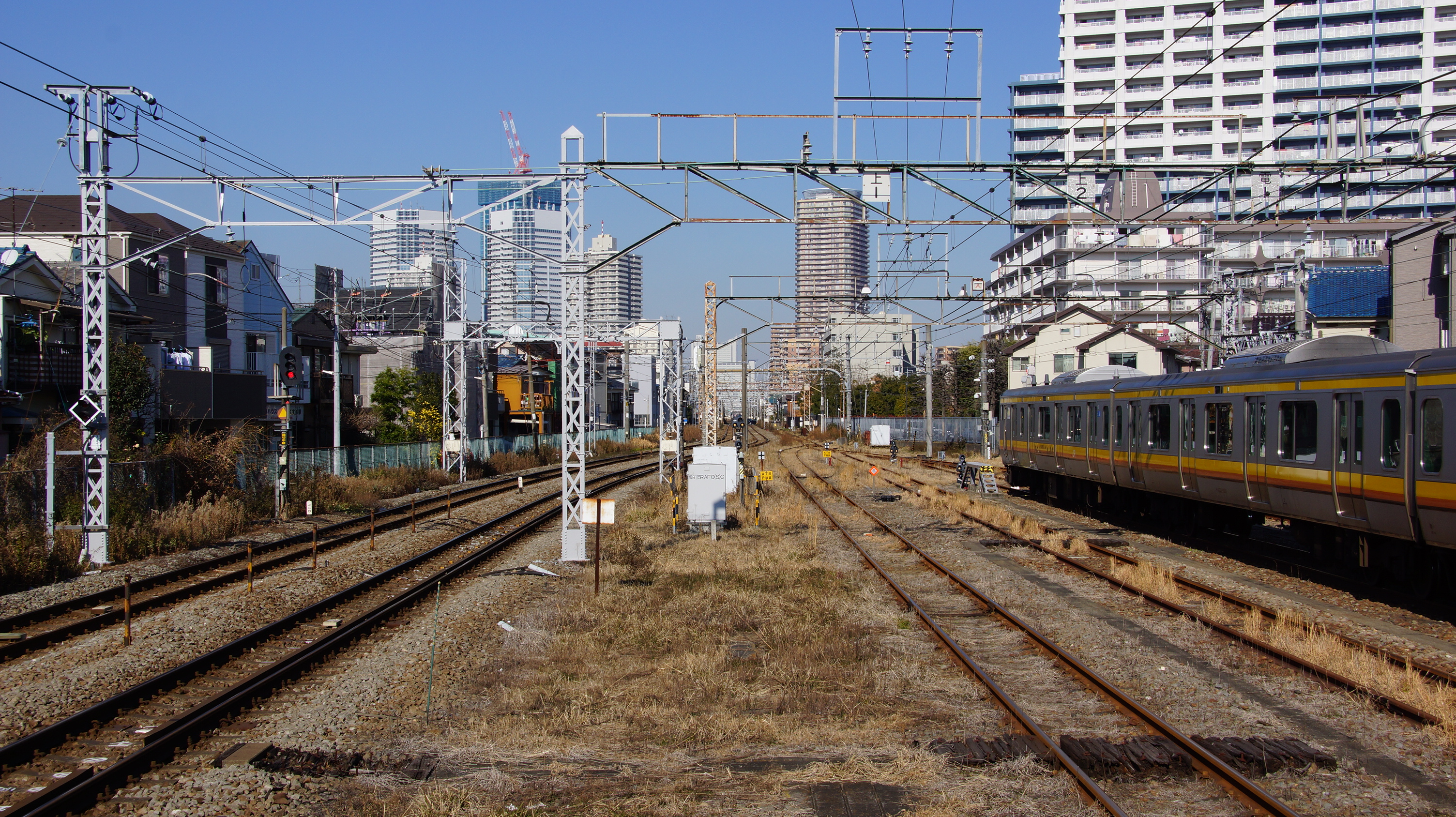
The view from the north end of platform 2/3 in January 2016, with the stabling sidings on the right

== History ==
Yakō Station opened as a station on the Nambu Railway on 9 March 1927.

The station building was burnt down during the bombing in 1945, and was later rebuilt.

With the privatization of Japanese National Railways (JNR) on 1 April 1987, the station came under the control of JR East.

== Passenger statistics ==
In fiscal 2019, the station was used by an average of 19,449 passengers daily (boarding passengers only).

The passenger figures (boarding passengers only) for previous years are as shown below.

Fiscal year	daily average
2005	14,555
2010	16,214
2015	17,979

== Surrounding area ==
- Yako District Center
- Yako Post Office
- Yako Shopping Street

== See also ==
- List of railway stations in Japan
