= Kashimada Station =

Railway station in Kawasaki, Kanagawa Prefecture, Japan

JN04 Kashimada Station 鹿島田駅
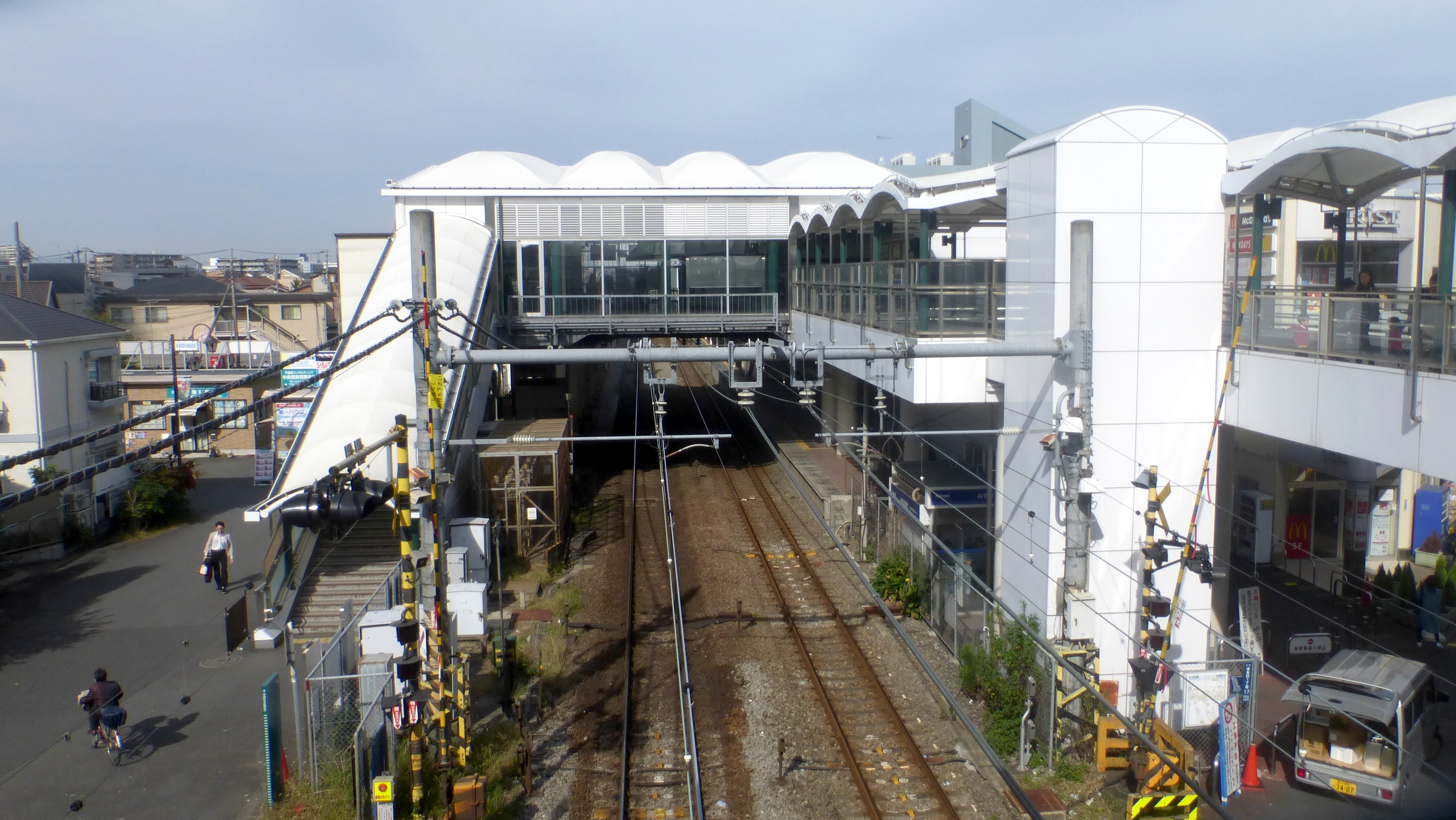
- Overview of the station from the south in November 2015

General information
- Location: Kashimada, Saiwai-ku, Kawasaki, Kanagawa-ken 212-0058; Japan
- Coordinates: 35.5517°N 139.6752°E
- Operator: JR East
- Line: Nambu Line
- Distance: 4.1 km from Kawasaki
- Platforms: 2 side platforms
- Tracks: 2
- Connections: Shin-Kawasaki Station (Yokosuka Line); Bus stop

Other information
- Status: Staffed (Midori no Madoguchi)
- Station code: JN04
- Website: Official website

History
- Opened: 9 March 1927

Passengers
- FY2019: 19,557 daily

Services
Preceding station	JR East	Following station
Musashi-Kosugi towards Tachikawa	Nambu Line Rapid	Kawasaki Terminus
Hirama JN05 towards Tachikawa	Nambu Line Local	Yakō JN03 towards Kawasaki
Location
- Location within Kanagawa Prefecture Location within Japan

Kashimada Station (鹿島田駅, Kashimada-eki) is a passenger railway station located in Saiwai-ku, Kawasaki, Kanagawa Prefecture, Japan, operated by the East Japan Railway Company (JR East).

== Lines ==
Kashimada Station is served by the Nambu Line. The station is 4.1 km (2.5 mi) from the southern terminus of the line at Kawasaki Station.

== Station layout ==
Kashimada Station has two opposed side platforms serving two tracks, connected by a footbridge to an elevated station building. The station has a Midori no Madoguchi staffed ticket office.

=== Platforms ===
1	Nambu Line	for Kawasaki
2	Nambu Line	for Musashi-Kosugi, Musashi-Mizonokuchi, Noborito, and Tachikawa

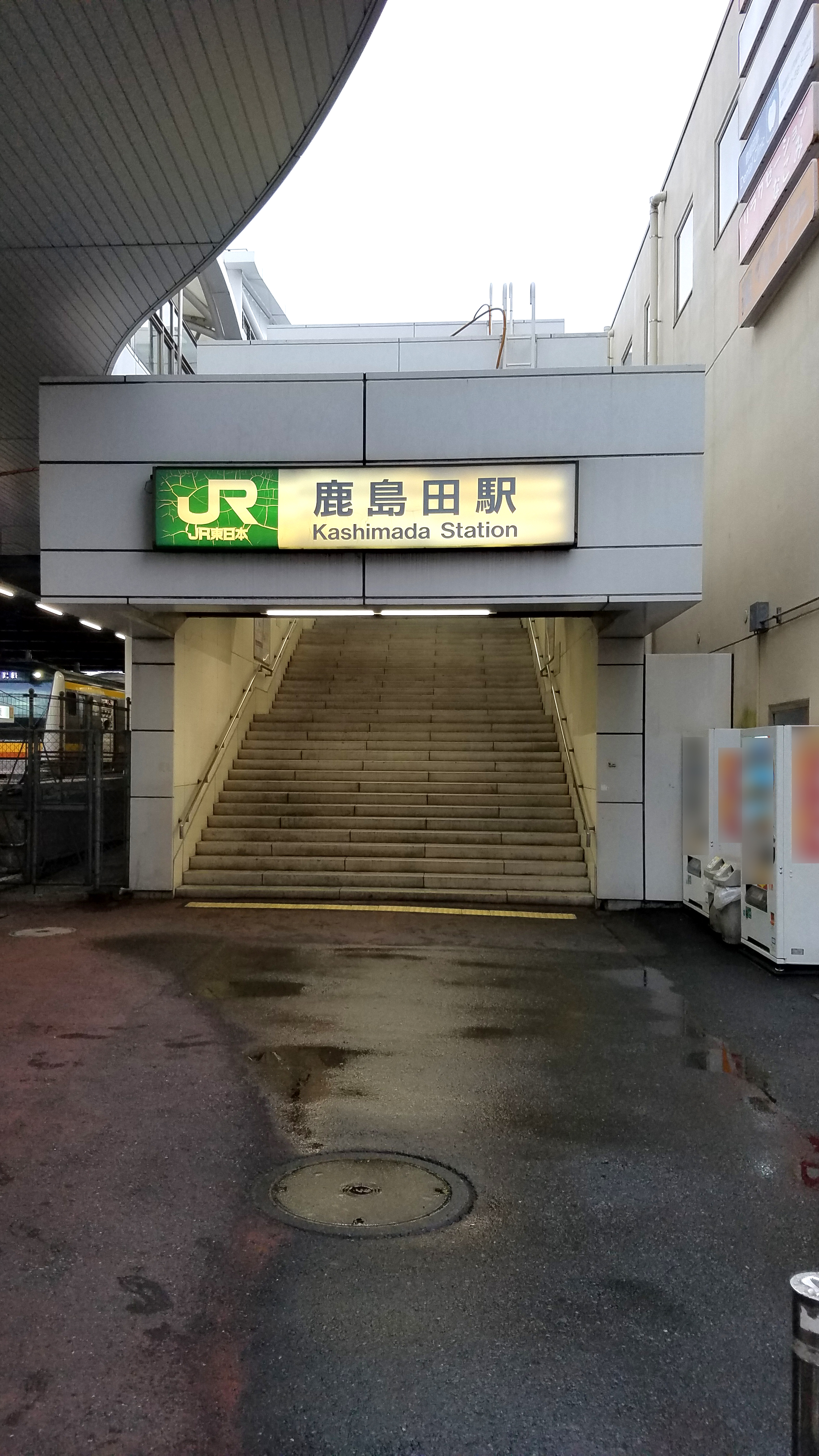
The east entrance in July 2021

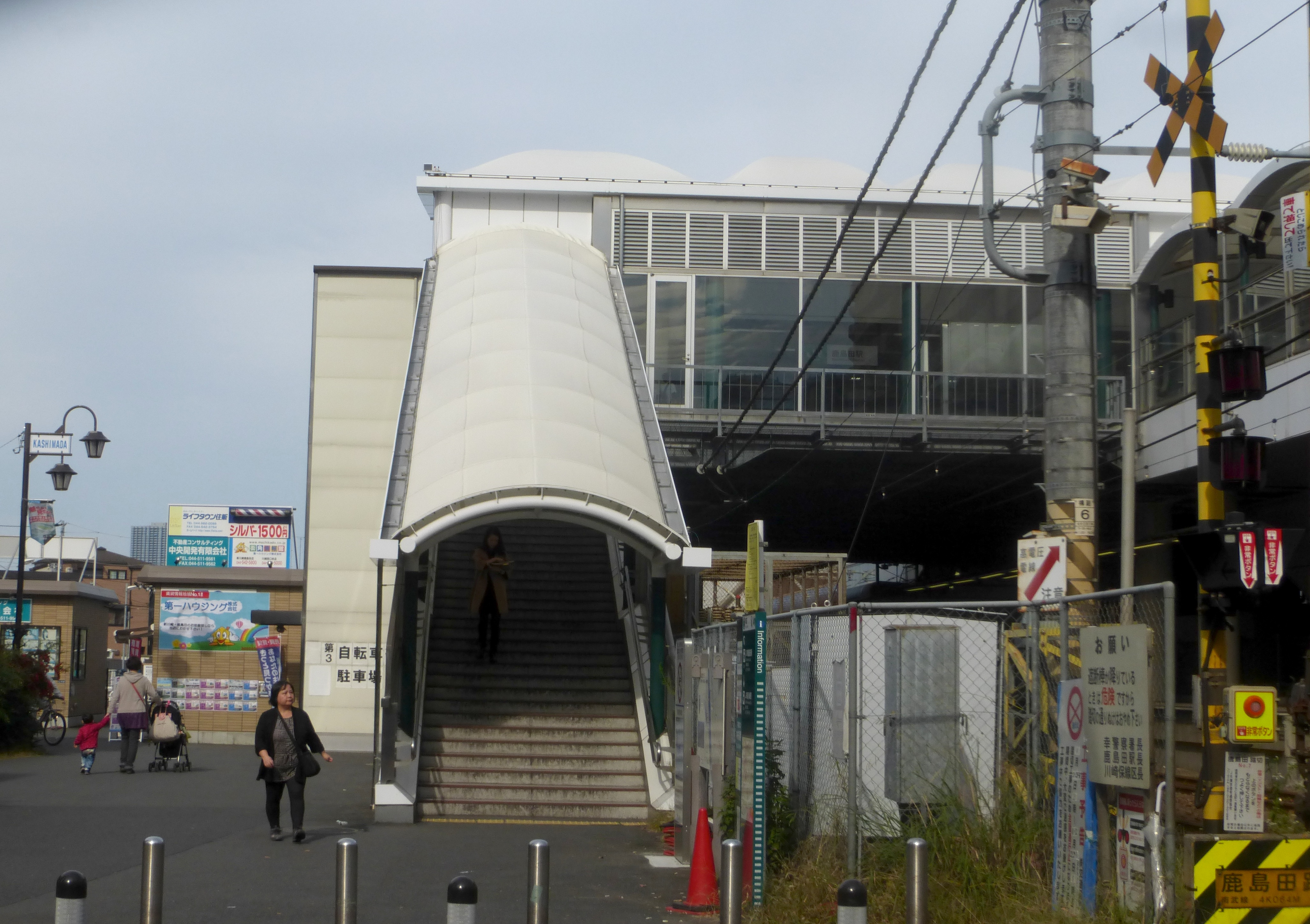
The west entrance in November 2015

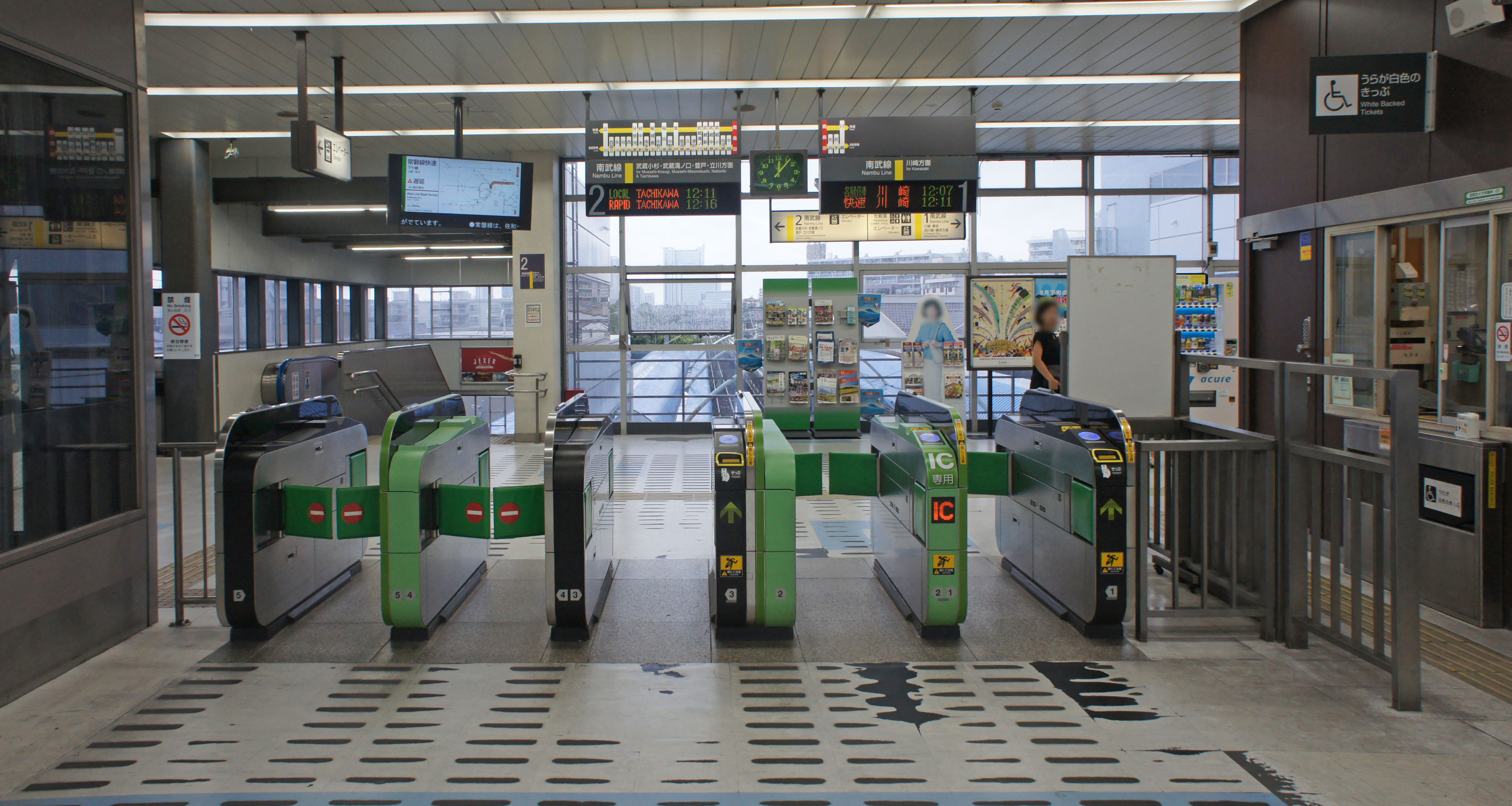
The ticket barriers in September 2019

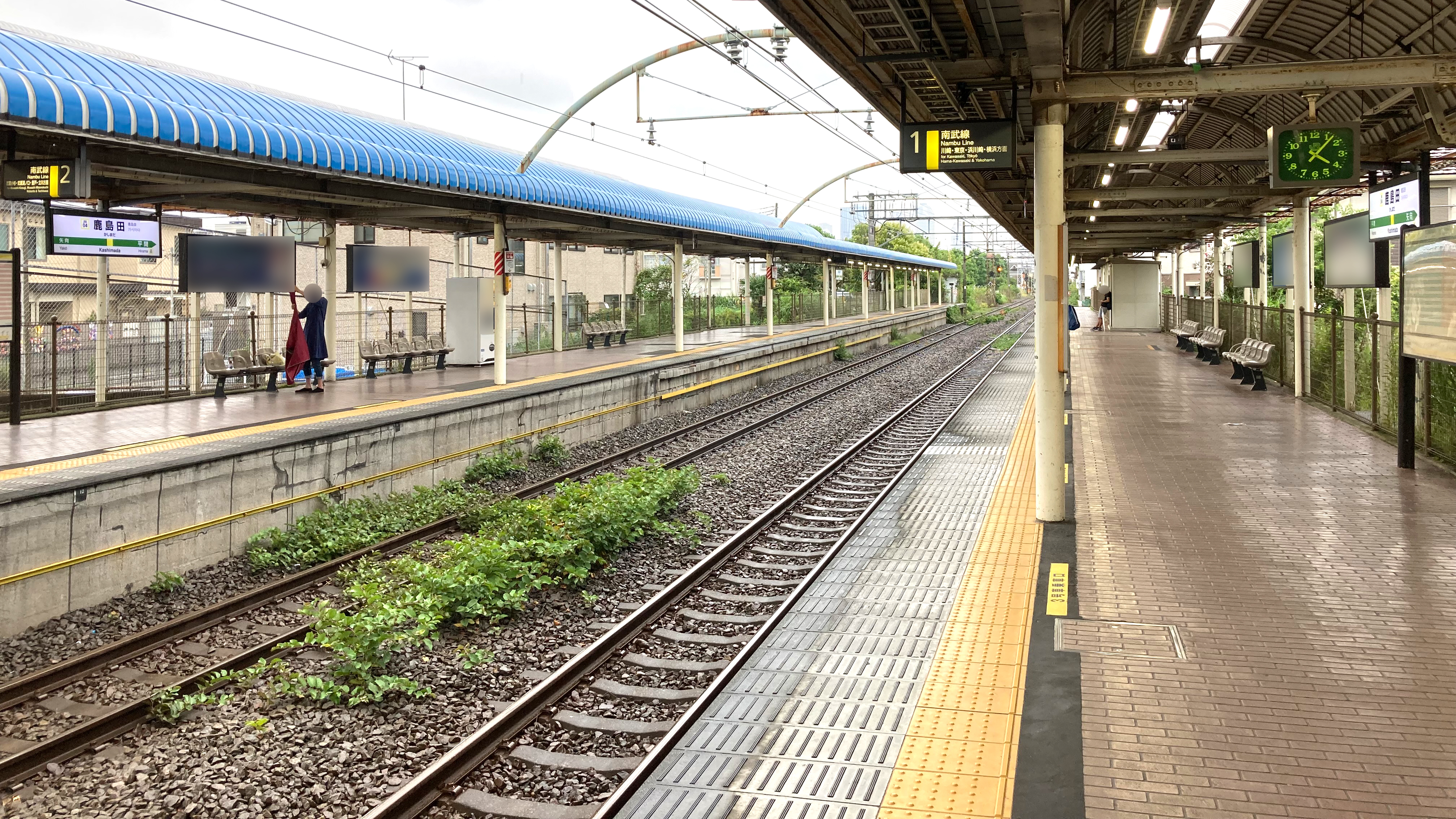
The platforms in July 2021 looking north

== History ==
The station opened on 9 March 1927. With the privatization of Japanese National Railways (JNR) on 1 April 1987, the station came under the control of JR East.

== Passenger statistics ==
In fiscal 2019, the station was used by an average of 19,557 passengers daily (boarding passengers only).

The passenger figures (boarding passengers only) for previous years are as shown below.

Fiscal year	daily average
2005	16,417
2010	15,977
2015	18,370

== Surrounding area ==
Shin-Kawasaki Station on the Yokosuka Line is located 400 meters to the west.

== See also ==
- List of railway stations in Japan
