= Nakahara-ku =

Nakahara 中原区
- Ward
- Nakahara Ward
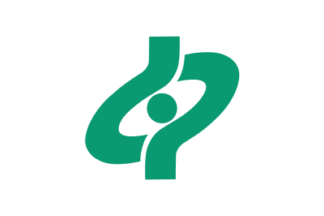
- Flag

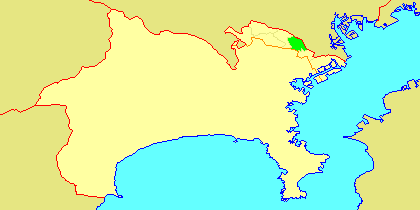
- Location of Nakahara in Kanagawa

- Coordinates: 35°34′34″N 139°39′21″E
- Country: Japan
- Region: Kantō
- Prefecture: Kanagawa
- City: Kawasaki
- Established: April 1, 1972

Area
  - Total: 14.70 km^{2} (5.68 sq mi)

Population (November 2014)
  - Total: 244,565
  - Density: 16,637/km^{2} (43,090/sq mi)
- Time zone: UTC+9 (Japan Standard Time)
- Flower: Pansy
- Address: 3-245 Kosugi-cho, Nakahara-ku Kawasaki-shi, Kanagawa-ken; 211-8570
- Website: Nakahara Ward Office

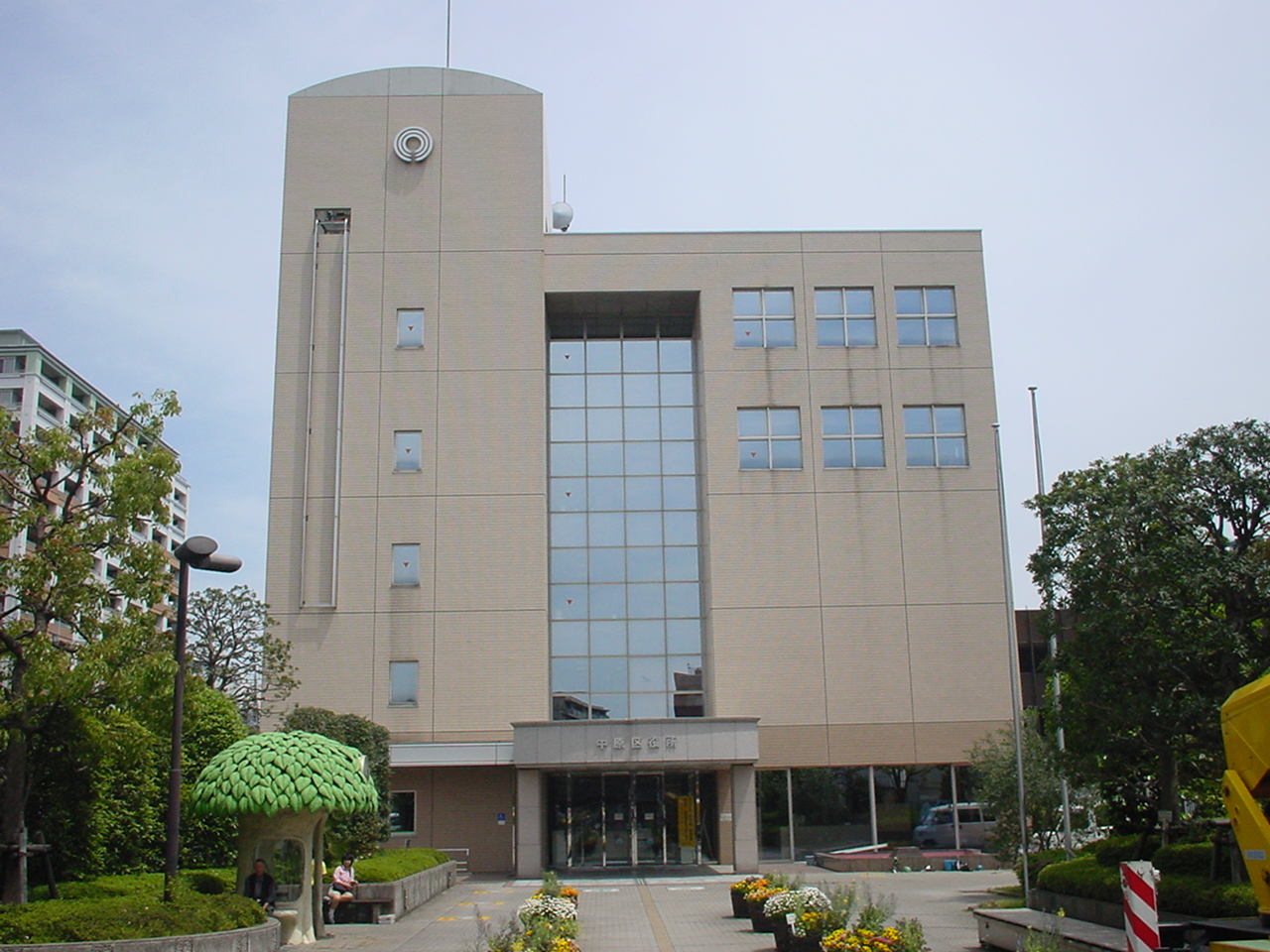
Nakahara Ward Office

Nakahara-ku (中原区) is one of the 7 wards of the city of Kawasaki in Kanagawa Prefecture, Japan.

The name as "Nakahara-ku" is derived from being a palace and a camp shop in Kosugi as a relay place by the Nakahara highway where Edo is formed with Nakahara palace (Hiratsuka-city) in the Edo Period.

== Geography ==
Nakahara Ward is located in eastern Kanagawa Prefecture, in the center portion of the city of Kawasaki, bordering on Tokyo to the north and Yokohama to the south.

=== Surrounding municipalities ===
- Saiwai-ku, Kawasaki
- Takatsu-ku, Kawasaki
- Setagaya-ku, Tokyo
- Ōta-ku, Tokyo
- Kōhoku-ku, Yokohama

== History ==
Archaeologists have found numerous Kofun period remains at numerous locations in what is now Nakahara-ku, indicating a long period of human settlement. Under the Nara period Ritsuryō system, it became part of Tachibana District Musashi Province. In the Edo period, it was administered as tenryō territory controlled directly by the Tokugawa shogunate, but administered through various hatamoto. After the Meiji Restoration, the area was divided into Nakahawa Village and Sumiyoshi Village within Tachibana District in the new Kanagawa Prefecture on April 1, 1889. The two villages merged in 1925 to form the town of Nakahara. The town was annexed by the neighboring city of Kawasaki in August 1933. In April 1972, the area became Nakahara Ward with the division of the city of Kawasaki into wards.

== Economy ==
Nakahara Ward is largely a regional commercial center and bedroom community for central Kawasaki and Tokyo. The Ward hosts Fujitsu's Main Branch at Kamiodanaka 4-chome in Nakahara-ku. It was formerly Fujitsu's world headquarters. Other industries include factories operated by Mitsubishi Fuso and NEC.

== Transportation ==
=== Railway ===
- JR East – Nambu Line
  - Musashi-Shinjō - Musashi-Nakahara - Musashi-Kosugi - Mukaigawara - Hirama
- JR East – Yokosuka Line
  - Musashi-Kosugi Station,
- Tokyu Corporation – Tōkyū Tōyoko Line / Tōkyū Meguro Line
  - Shin-Maruko - Musashi-Kosugi - Motosumiyoshi

The Tōkaidō Shinkansen passes through Nakahara-ku but does not stop.

=== Highway ===
- National Route 466 (No. 3 Keihin Road, as "Daisan-Keihin" (第三京浜))
- Kanagawa Prefectural Road 2
- Kanagawa Prefectural Road 14
- Kanagawa Prefectural Road 45
- Kanagawa Prefectural Road 111

== Local attractions ==
- Todoroki Athletics Stadium

== Education ==
- Nippon Medical School – Shin-Maruko Campus

Municipal junior high schools:

- Gyokusen (玉川中学校)
- Hirama (平間中学校)
- Ida (井田中学校)
- Imai (今井中学校)
- Miyauchi (宮内中学校)
- Nakahara (中原中学校)
- Nishi Nakahara (西中原中学校)
- Sumiyoshi (住吉中学校)

Municipal elementary schools:

- Gyokusen (玉川小学校)
- Higashi Sumiyoshi (東住吉小学校)
- Hirama (平間小学校)
- Ida (井田小学校)
- Imai (今井小学校)
- Kami Maruko (上丸子小学校)
- Kariyado (苅宿小学校)
- Kizuki (木月小学校)
- Kosugi (小杉小学校)
- Miyauchi (宮内小学校)
- Nakahara (中原小学校)
- Nishi Maruko (西丸子小学校)
- Ogayato (大谷戸小学校)
- Oto (大戸小学校)
- Shimogawara (下河原小学校)
- Shimokodanaka (下小田中小学校)
- Shimonumabe (下沼部小学校)
- Shinjo (新城小学校)
- Sumiyoshi (住吉小学校)
