= Mukaigawara Station =

Railway station in Kawasaki, Kanagawa Prefecture, Japan

JN06 Mukaigawara Station 向河原駅
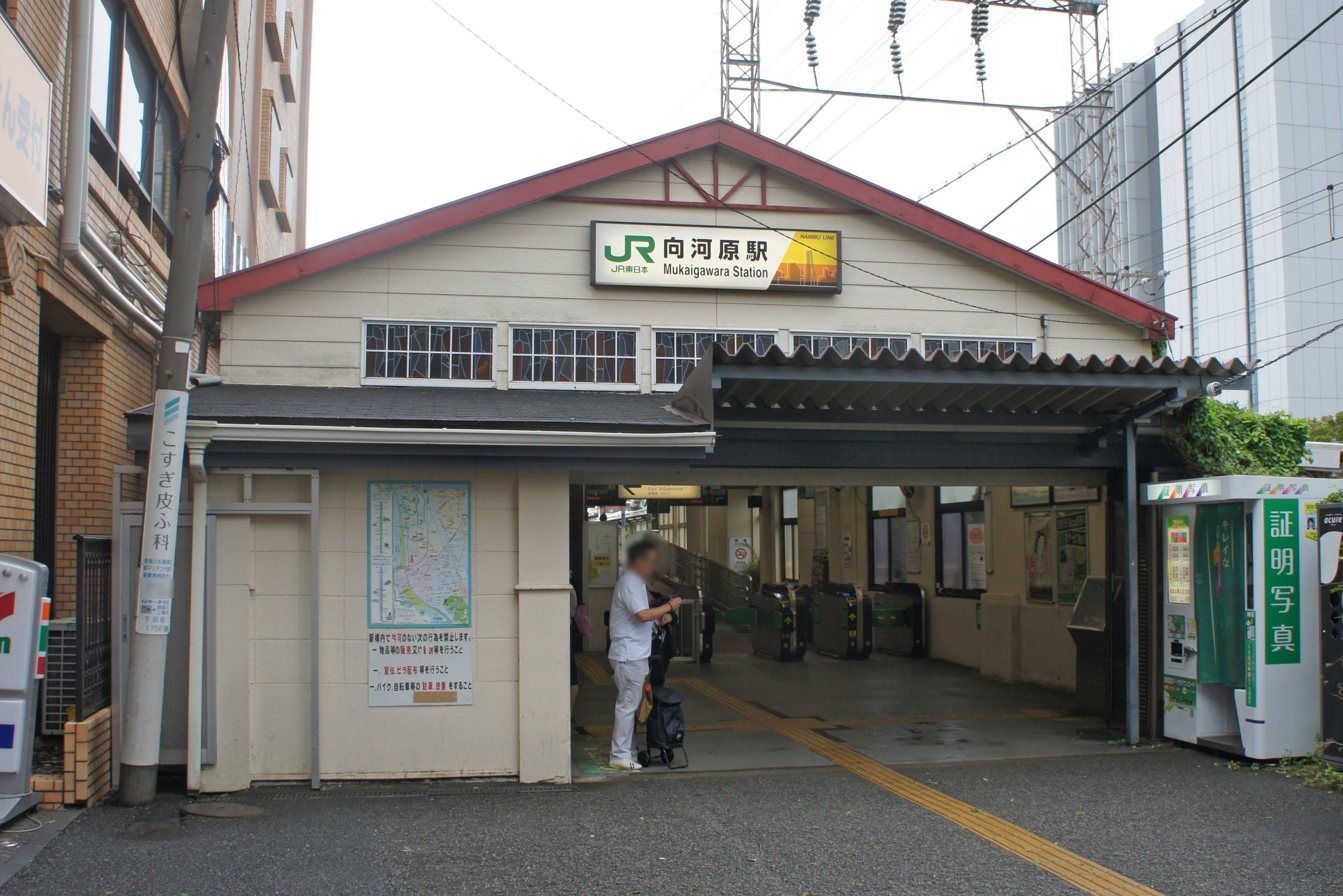
- Mukaigawara Station, September 2019

General information
- Location: Shimo-Numabe 1757, Nakahara-ku, Kawasaki-shi, Kanagawa-ken 211-0011; Japan
- Coordinates: 35.5716°N 139.6667°E
- Operator: JR East
- Line: Nambu Line
- Distance: 20.8 km from Kawasaki
- Platforms: 2 side platforms
- Tracks: 2

Other information
- Station code: JN06
- Website: Official website

History
- Opened: 9 March 1927
- Former names: Nihon-Denki-mae (until 1942)

Passengers
- FY2019: 12,385 daily

Services
Preceding station	JR East	Following station
Musashi-Kosugi towards Tachikawa	Nambu Line Local	Hirama JN05 towards Kawasaki
Location
- Location within Kanagawa Prefecture Location within Japan

Mukaigawara Station (向河原駅, Mukaigawara-eki) is a passenger railway station located in Nakahara-ku, Kawasaki, Kanagawa Prefecture, Japan, operated by the East Japan Railway Company (JR East).

== Lines ==
Mukaigawara Station is served by the Nambu Line. The station is 6.6 km (4.1 mi) from the southern terminus of the line at Kawasaki Station.

== Station layout ==
The station consists of two opposed side platforms serving two tracks, connected by a footbridge. The station is attended.

=== Platforms ===
1	Nambu Line	for Kawasaki
2	Nambu Line	for Musashi-Kosugi, Noborito, Fuchū-Hommachi, and Tachikawa

== History ==
Mukaigawara Station opened as a station on the Nambu Railway on 9 March 1927. It was renamed Nihon-Denki-mae Station (日本電気前駅, Nihon-Denki-mae-eki) on 5 August 1940. Along with nationalization of Nambu Railway, the station reverted to its original name under the Japanese Government Railway Nambu Line on 1 April 1944, and became part of the Japan National Railways (JNR) system from 1946. Freight operations were discontinued from 1973. Along with privatization and division of JNR, JR East started operating the station on 1 April 1987.

== Passenger statistics ==
In fiscal 2019, the station was used by an average of 12,385 passengers daily (boarding passengers only).

The passenger figures (boarding passengers only) for previous years are as shown below.

Fiscal year	daily average
2005	13,897
2010	15,077
2015	12,342

== Surrounding area ==
- NEC Tamagawa Plant (NEC Tamagawa Renaissance City)
- Kawasaki Municipal Tachibana High School

== See also ==
- List of railway stations in Japan
