= Motosumiyoshi Station =

Railway station in Kawasaki, Kanagawa Prefecture, Japan

Motosumiyoshi Station 元住吉駅

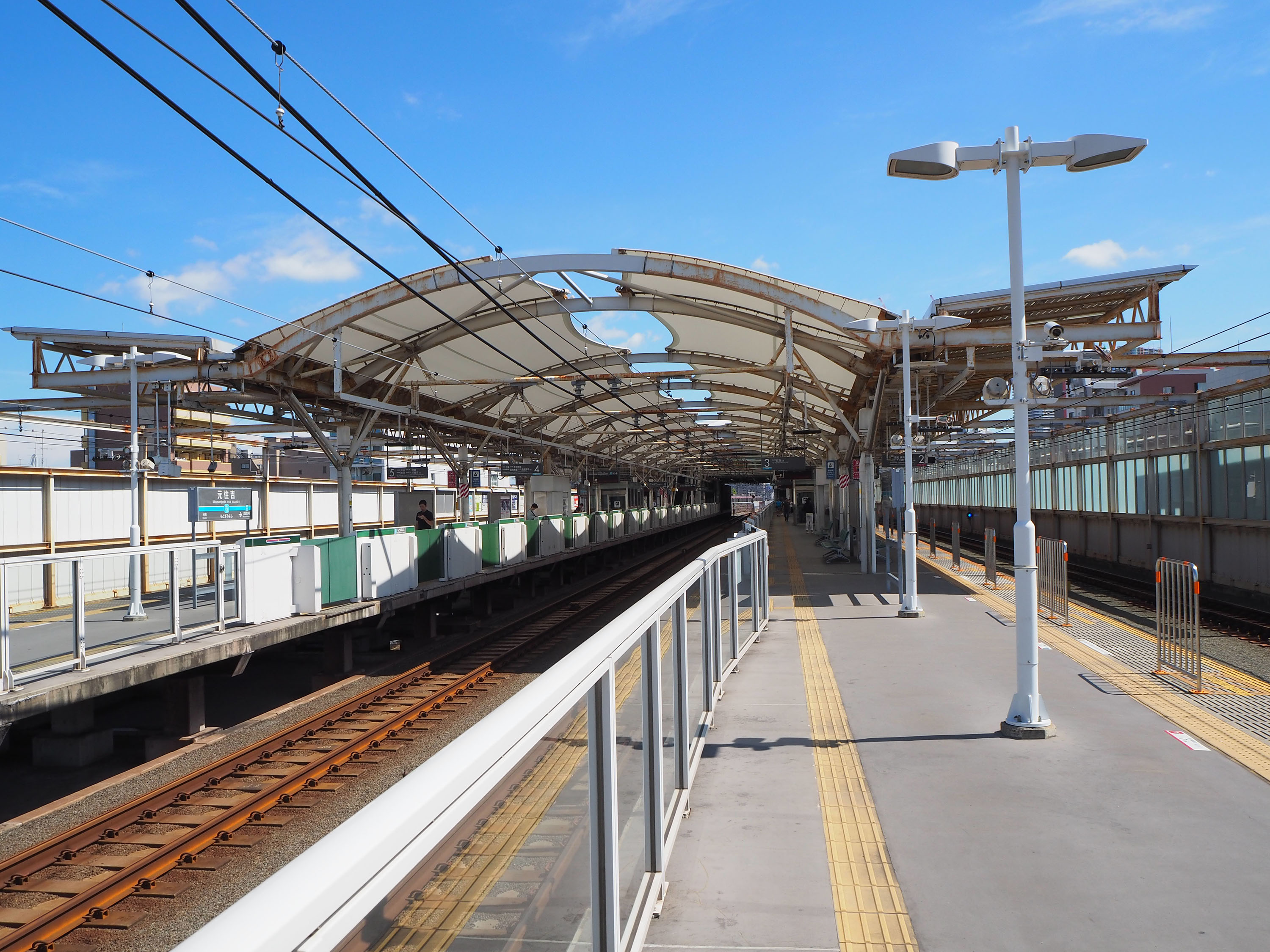
- Motosumiyoshi Station Platform

General information
- Location: Kizuki 1-36-1, Nakahara-ku, Kawasaki-shi, Kanagawa-ken 211-0025; Japan
- Coordinates: 35°33′52″N 139°39′15″E
- Operator: Tōkyū Railways
- Lines: Tōkyū Tōyoko Line; Tōkyū Meguro Line
- Distance: 10.7 km (6.6 mi) from Shibuya
- Platforms: 2 island platforms
- Connections: Bus stop

Construction
- Structure type: Elevated

Other information
- Station code: TY12
- Website: Official website

History
- Opened: 14 February 1926; 100 years ago

Passengers
- FY2019: 67,853

Services
Preceding station	Tōkyū Railways	Following station
Hiyoshi towards Yokohama	Tōyoko Line Local	Musashi-kosugi towards Shibuya
Hiyoshi Terminus	Meguro Line Local	Musashi-kosugi towards Meguro
Track layout
Location
- Location within Tokyo Bay and Bōsō Peninsula Location within Yokohama Location within Kanagawa Prefecture Location within Tokyo Location within Japan

Motosumiyoshi Station (元住吉駅, Motosumiyoshi-eki) is a junction passenger railway station located in Nakahara-ku, Kawasaki, Kanagawa Prefecture, Japan, operated by the private railway company Tokyu Corporation.

== Lines ==
Motosumiyoshi Station is served by the Tōkyū Tōyoko Line and is 12.1 kilometers from the starting point of the line at Shibuya. It is also served by the Tōkyū Meguro Line and is 10.4 kilometers from the terminus of that line at Meguro. Due to its proximity to a train depot for these lines, some early morning and late night trains come in and out of service from this station.

== Station layout ==
The station is composed of two island platforms and six tracks. The outermost tracks, 1 and 6, are for through passage of express traffic on the Toyoko Line.

=== Platforms ===
For Passing	■ Tōyoko Line	Used for express services or faster
2	■ Toyoko Line	Hiyoshi・Kikuna・Yokohama ・Minatomirai ・ Motomachi-Chūkagai
3	■ Meguro Line	Hiyoshi
4	■ Meguro Line	Musashi-kosugi ・ Ōokayama ・ Meguro (Tokyo Metro Namboku Line) Akabane-Iwabuchi, (Saitama Rapid Railway Line) Urawa-Misono (Toei Mita Line) Nishi-Takashimadaira
5	■ Tōyoko Line	Musashi-kosugi ・ Jiyūgaoka ・Shibuya・ Tokyo Metro Fukutoshin Line for Kotake-Mukaihara and Wakōshi
For Passing	■ Toyoko Line	Used for express services or faster

== History ==
Motosumiyoshi Station opened as one of the original Tōyoko Line stations on February 14, 1926. The station was rebuilt as an underground station (ticket gates were underground and platforms were on the ground) in 1963, but was totally reconstructed in 2006 as an elevated above-ground station.

On February 15, 2014, at around 12:30 a.m., two Tōyoko Line trains collided on the Yokohama-bound track at the station. 19 passengers were lightly injured in the accident. The cause of the accident was supposedly the heavy snow that resulted in lack of braking force.

== Passenger statistics ==
In fiscal 2019, the station was used by an average of 67,853 passengers daily.

The daily average passenger figures for previous years are as shown below.

Fiscal year	Tōyoko Line	Meguro Line
2005	58,147	NA
2010	45,859	14,661
2015	46,595	17,651

== Surrounding area ==
- Sumiyoshi Shrine
- Kanto Workers' Health and Safety Hospital
- Tokyu Corporation Former Sumiyoshi Depot
- Tokyu Driving School / Train Driver Training Center
- Kanagawa Prefectural Sumiyoshi High School
- Hosei University Second Junior and Senior High School

== See also ==
- List of railway stations in Japan
