= Musashi-Kosugi Station =

Major railway station and transportation hub in Kawasaki, Kanagawa Prefecture, Japan

Musashi-Kosugi Station 武蔵小杉駅
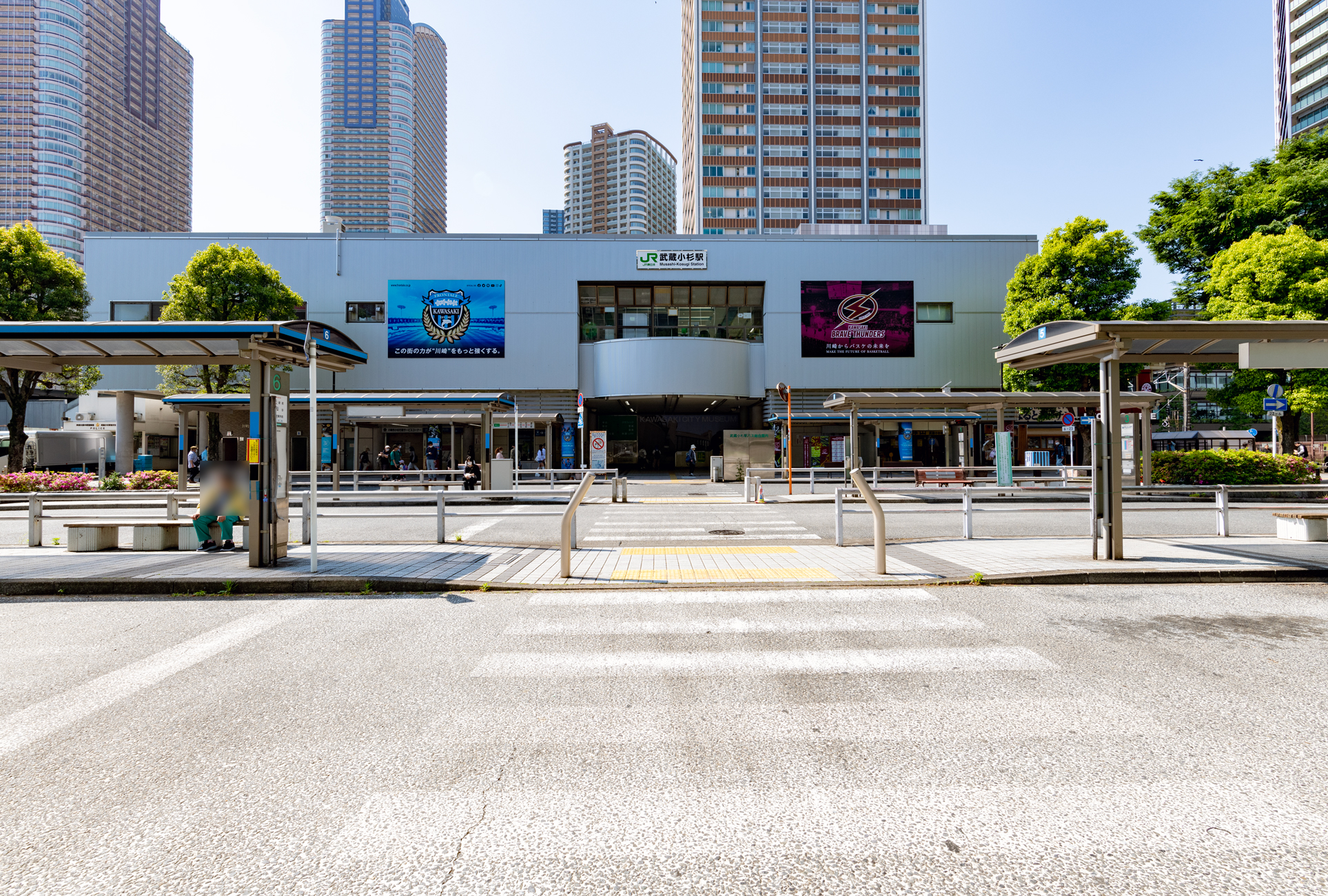
- JR East Musashi-Kosugi Station, north exit

General information
- Location: Nakahara, Kawasaki, Kanagawa; Japan
- Coordinates: 35°34′33″N 139°39′35″E
- Operator: JR East; Tōkyū Railways

History
- Opened: 1927
Location
- Location within Tokyo Bay and Bōsō Peninsula Location within Kanagawa Prefecture Location within Tokyo Location within Japan

Musashi-Kosugi Station (武蔵小杉駅, Musashi-Kosugi-eki) is a pair of physically separated interchange passenger railway stations, a block from each other, located in Nakahara Ward of eastern Kawasaki, Kanagawa, Japan, operated by East Japan Railway Company (JR East) and the private-sector railway operator Tokyu Corporation. Note that the term JR East Musashi-Kosugi Station is non-specific, the physical buildings of the Yokosuka and Nambu lines run by the same company are some 400 meters away, connected by a passageway.

== Area layout ==
There are essentially two complexes that make up Musashi-Kosugi Station, with a 400-meter connector passageway between them. The western complex contains a Nambu Line JR East station and a Tokyu station in one building. The eastern station is part of the Tokaido Line and contains JR East Yokosuka Line as well as Shinkansen tracks, though the Shinkansen tracks have no stop. Although it is common to name stations after their operator, the term JR East Musashi-Kosugi Station is therefore non-specific as JR East services both complexes.

== Lines ==
Musashi-Kosugi Station is served by JR East's Nambu Line, Yokosuka Line, and Shōnan-Shinjuku Line, as well as Tokyu's Tōyoko Line and Meguro Line.

== JR East ==
MKGJN07 JO15 JS15 Musashi-Kosugi Station 武蔵小杉駅
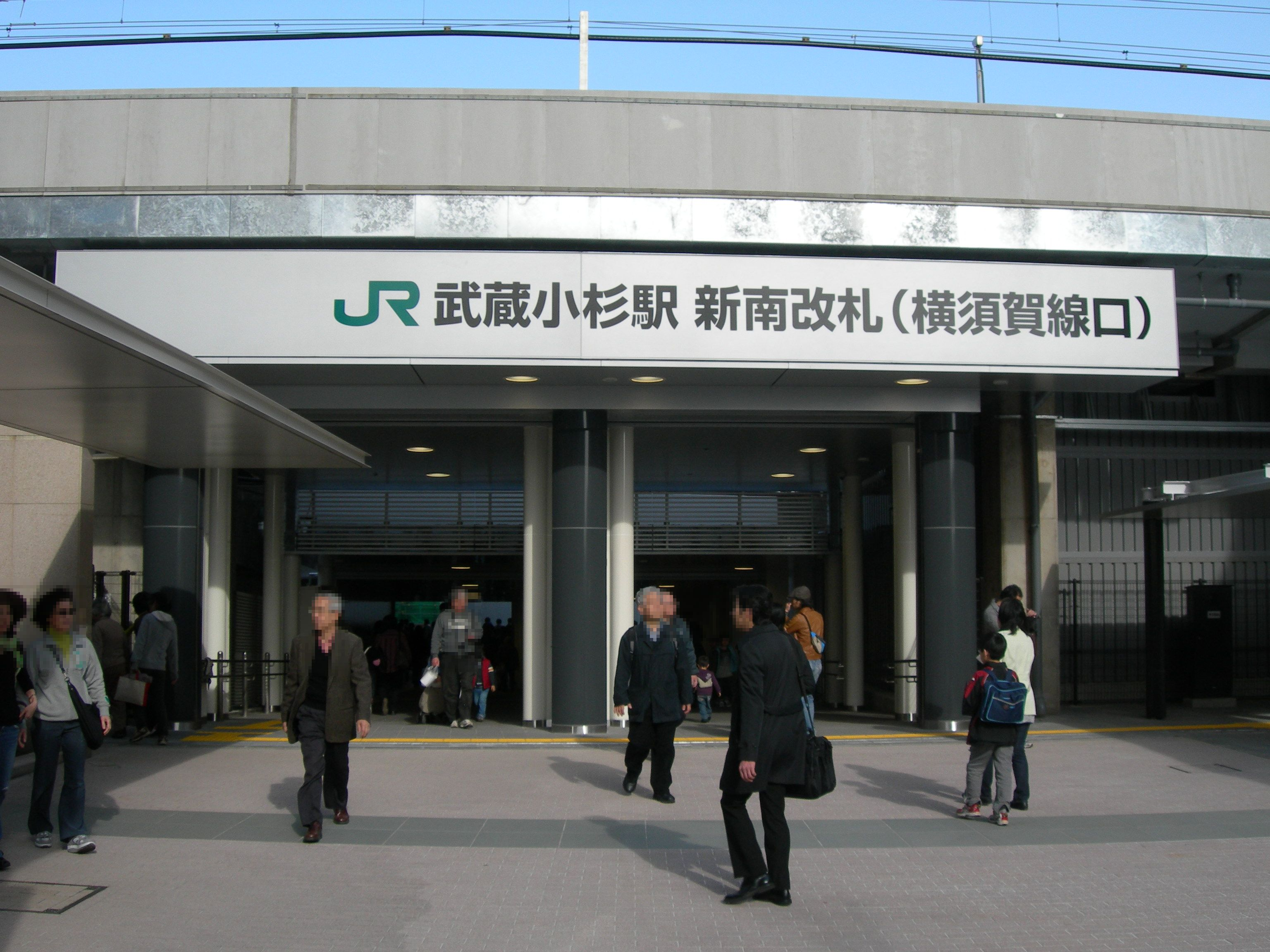
- JR Musashi-Kosugi Station exit

General information
- Location: 3-492 Kosugimachi, Nakahara-ku, Kawasaki-shi, Kanagawa-ken （神奈川県川崎市中原区小杉町3-492） Japan
- System: JR East station
- Operator: JR East
- Lines: Nambu Line; Yokosuka Line; Shōnan-Shinjuku Line
- Distance: 16.8 km (10.4 mi) from Tokyo
- Platforms: 1 island + 2 side platforms
- Connections: Bus terminal

Other information
- Status: Staffed (Midori no Madoguchi)

History
- Opened: 1 April 1944; 82 years ago

Passengers
- FY2019: 129,194 daily
Services
| Preceding station | JR East | Following station |
|---|---|---|
| Musashi-Nakahara JN08 towards Tachikawa | Nambu Line Rapid | Kashimada JN04 towards Kawasaki |
| Musashi-Nakahara JN08 towards Tachikawa | Nambu Line Local | Mukaigawara JN06 towards Kawasaki |
| Yokohama towards Ōfuna | Narita Express | Shinagawa towards Narita Airport Terminal 1 |
| Shin-Kawasaki JO14 towards Kurihama | Yokosuka Line | Nishi-Ōi JO16 towards Tokyo |
| Yokohama towards Itō | Saphir Odoriko | Shibuya towards Takasaki |
| Yokohama towards Odawara | Shōnan–Shinjuku Line Special Rapid Rapid | Ōsaki towards Takasaki or Maebashi |
| Shin-Kawasaki JS14 towards Zushi | Shōnan–Shinjuku Line Rapid Local | Nishi-Ōi JS16 towards Utsunomiya |
| Hazawa yokohama-kokudai towards Ebina | Sōtetsu–JR Link Line | Nishi-Ōi JS16 towards Shinjuku |
Location

=== Station layout ===
JR Musashi-Kosugi Station has two opposed side platforms serving the two tracks (Platform 1 and Platform 2) of the Nambu Line and two side platforms serving the two tracks (Platform 3 and Platform 4) of the Yokosuka Line. The Shōnan-Shinjuku Line and Narita Express share the Yokosuka Line platforms. The two sections of the JR station are located separately and connected by a 400 m-long (1,300 ft) passage. All platforms are elevated, as is the station building. The station has a Midori no Madoguchi staffed ticket office.

Since December 2023, the new "Tsunashima Road" ticket gate and entrance, located between the Nambu Line and Yokosuka Line platforms, have been open to the public. This entrance provides a faster transfer between the Yokosuka Line platforms and the Tōkyū Railways station, eliminating the need to traverse the Nambu Line platform and helping to reduce congestion.

=== Platforms ===
| 1 | Nambu Line | for Mukaigawara, Yakō, and Kawasaki |
| 2 | Nambu Line | for Musashi-Mizonokuchi, Noborito, and Tachikawa |
| 3 | Yokosuka Line | for Yokohama, Ōfuna, Zushi, and Kurihama |
| 3 | Shōnan-Shinjuku Line | for Yokohama, Zushi, and Odawara □ Saphir Odoriko for Atami and Izukyū-Shimoda |
| 3 | Through to Sōtetsu Shin-Yokohama Line | for Hazawa yokohama-kokudai Sotetsu Line for Nishiya and Futamata-gawa |
| 4 | Yokosuka Line | for Tokyo, Chiba, and Narita Airport (Terminal 2·3 and Terminal 1) □ Narita Express for Narita Airport |
| 4 | Shōnan-Shinjuku Line | for Ōsaki, Shinjuku, Ikebukuro, Ōmiya, Takasaki and Utsunomiya □ Saphir Odoriko for Shinjuku and Ikebukuro |
| 4 | Through to Saikyō Line | for Ōsaki and Shinjuku |

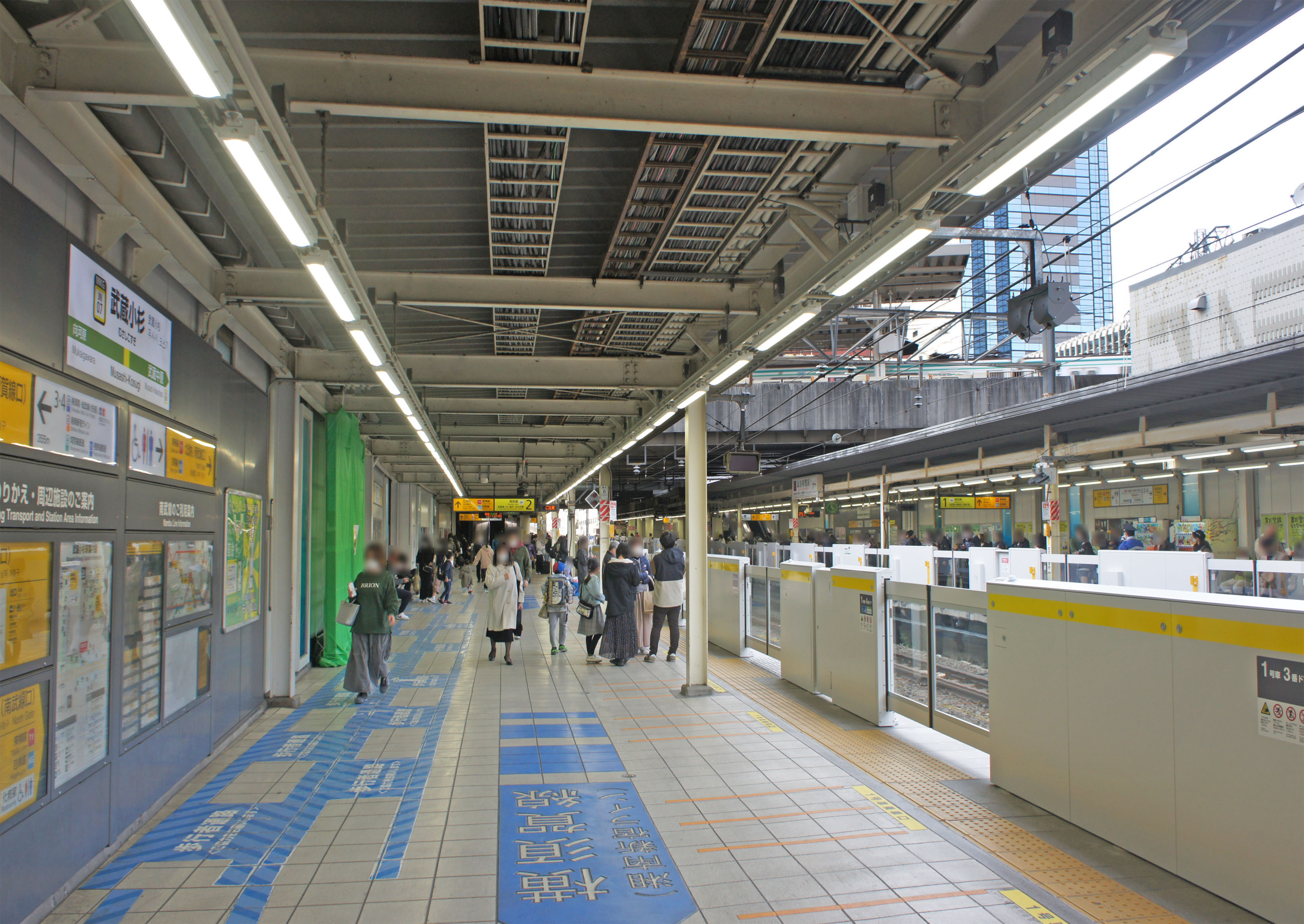
Nambu Line platforms

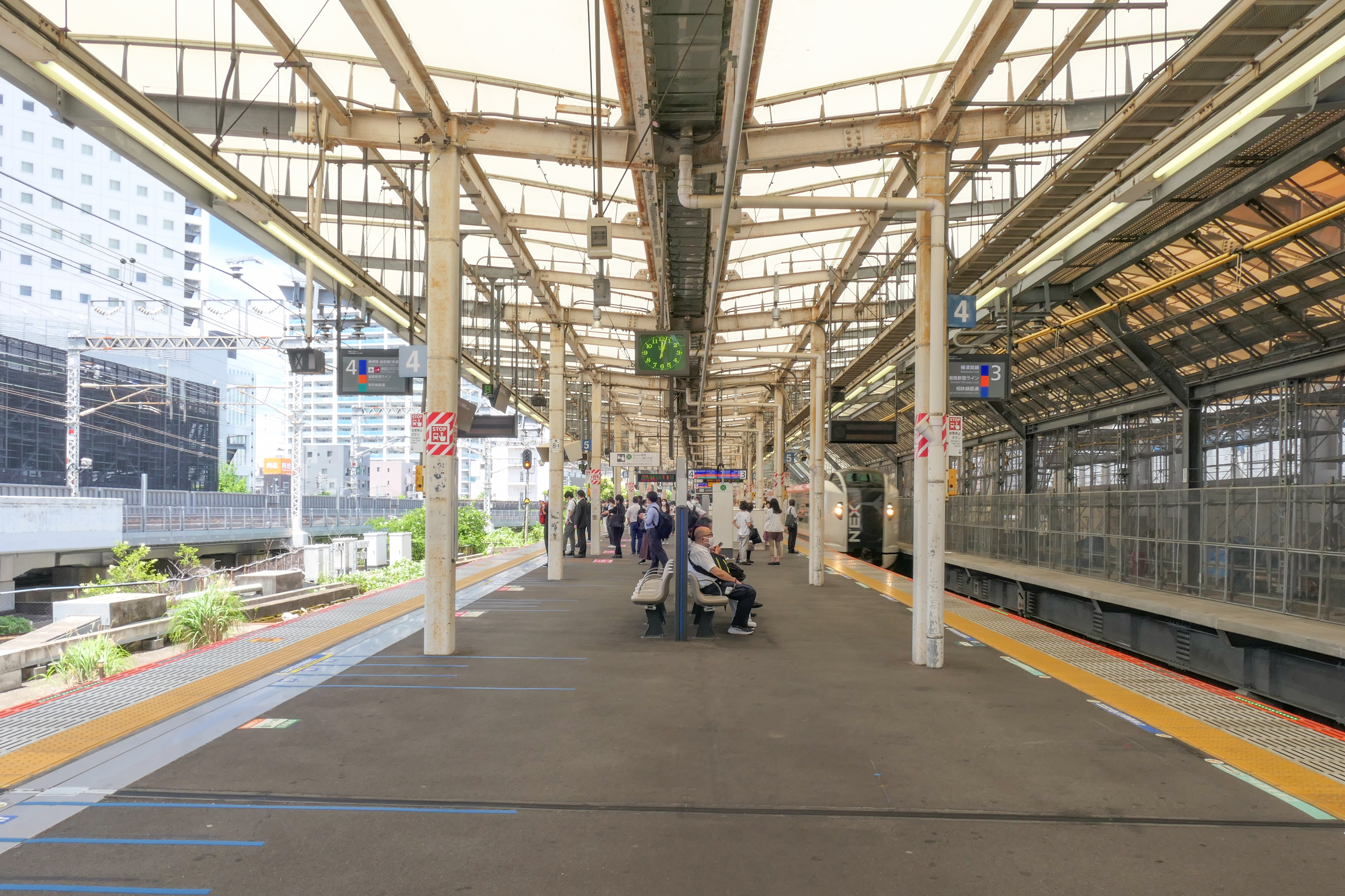
Platforms 3 and 4 on the Yokosuka Line

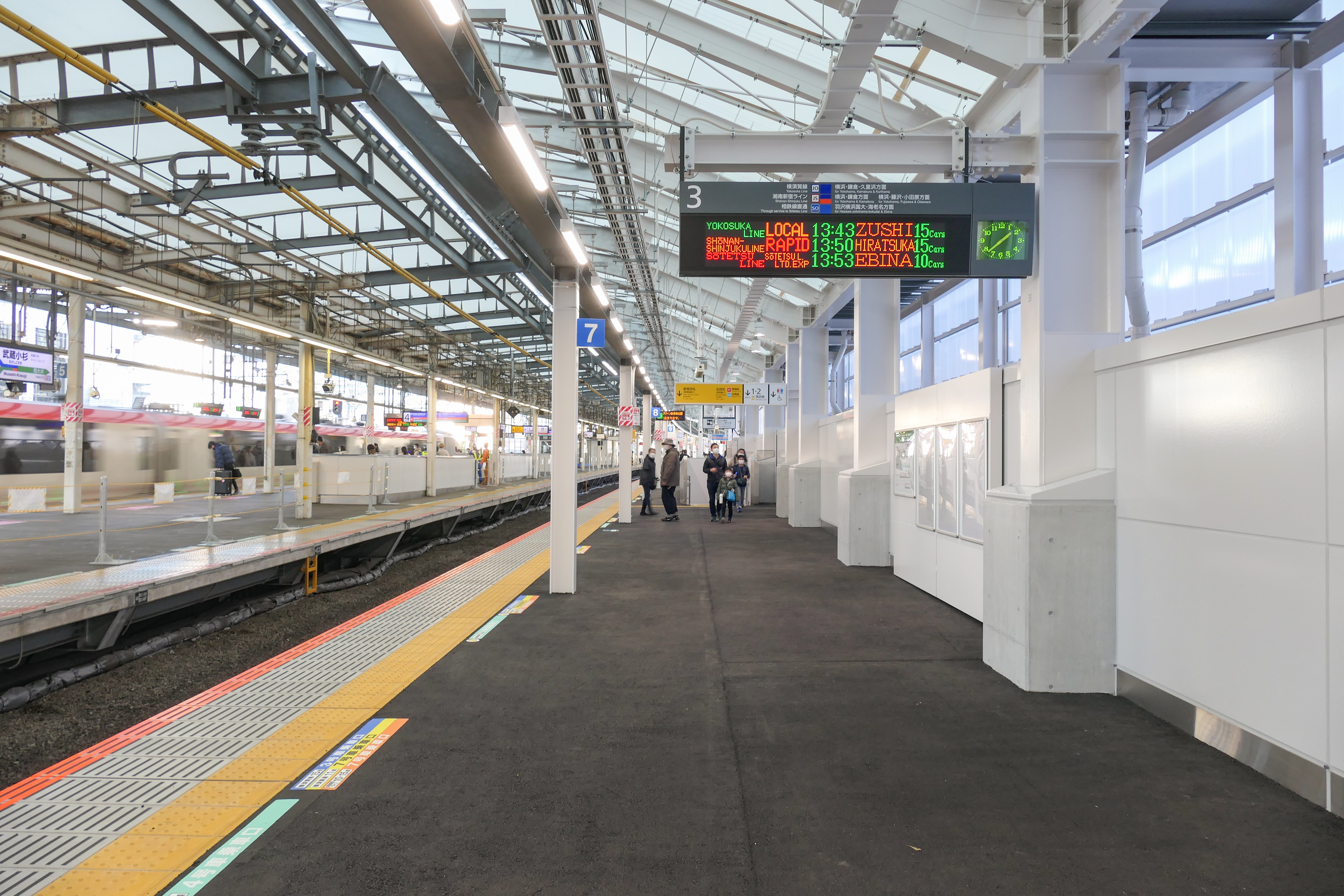
Updated platform 3 (opened in December 2022)

== Tokyu ==
Musashi-Kosugi Station 武蔵小杉駅

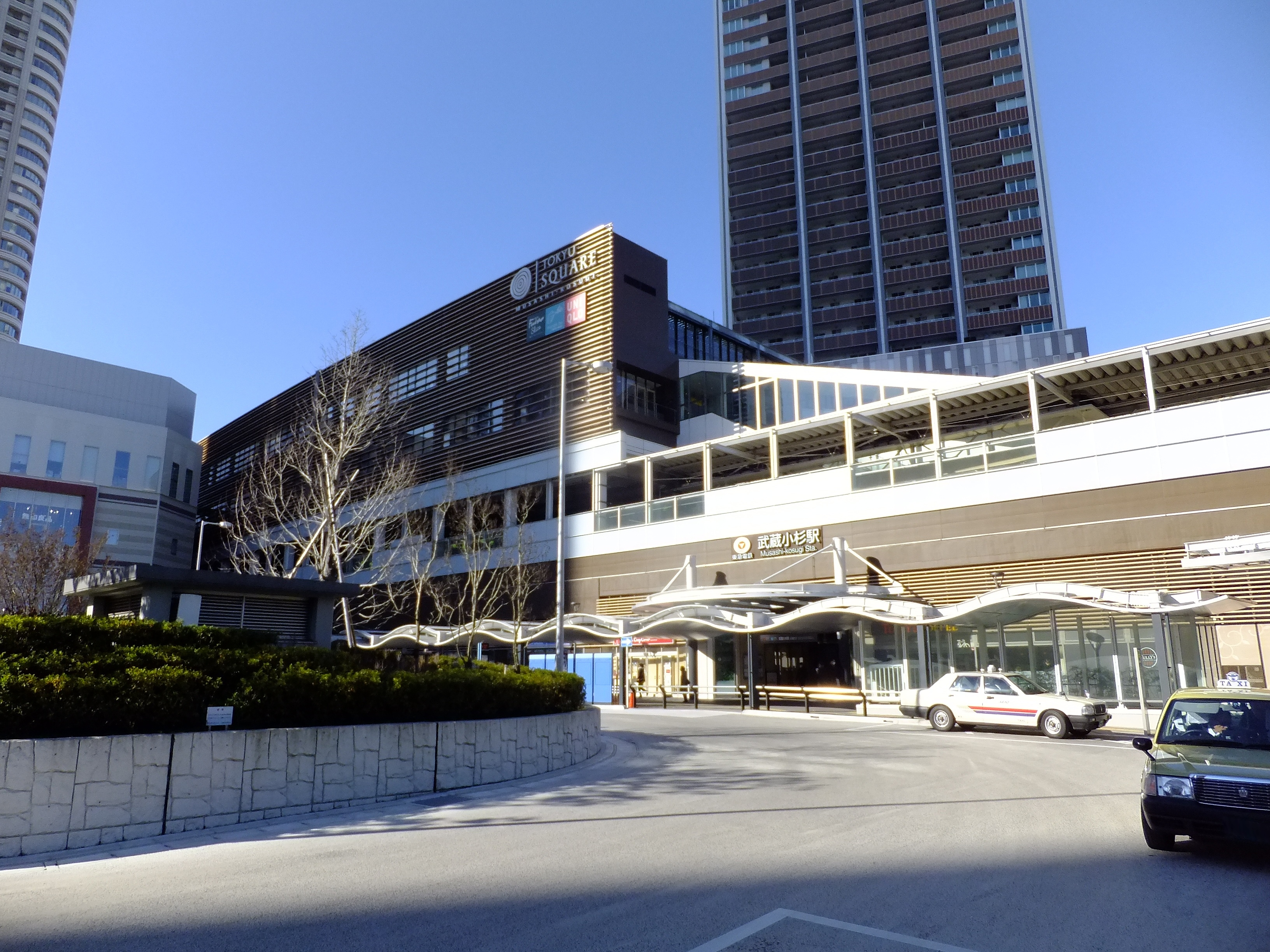
- Tokyu Musashi-Kosugi main entrance

General information
- Location: 3-472 Kosugimachi, Nakahara Ward, Kawasaki City, Kanagawa Prefecture; Japan
- System: Tokyu station
- Operator: Tōkyū Railways
- Lines: Tōyoko Line; Meguro Line
- Distance: 9.1 km (5.7 mi) from Meguro
- Platforms: 2 island platforms

Other information
- Station code: TY11, MG11

History
- Opened: 16 June 1945; 81 years ago

Passengers
- FY2019: 223,256 daily

Services
| Preceding station | Tōkyū Railways | Following station |
|---|---|---|
| Kikuna towards Motomachi-Chūkagai | F Liner | Jiyūgaoka towards Hannō or Ogawamachi |
| Kikuna towards Yokohama | Tōyoko Line Limited Express | Jiyūgaoka towards Shibuya |
| Hiyoshi towards Yokohama | Tōyoko Line Commuter Express | Jiyūgaoka towards Shibuya |
| Hiyoshi towards Yokohama | Tōyoko Line Express | Tamagawa towards Shibuya |
| Motosumiyoshi towards Yokohama | Tōyoko Line Local | Shin-maruko towards Shibuya |
| Hiyoshi Terminus | Meguro Line Express | Tamagawa towards Meguro |
| Motosumiyoshi towards Hiyoshi | Meguro Line Local | Shin-maruko towards Meguro |
Location

=== Station layout ===
Tokyu Musashi-Kosugi Station has two island platforms serving four tracks. The outer tracks (Platform 1 and Platform 4) are used by the Tokyu Toyoko Line, and the inner tracks (Platform 2 and Platform 3) are used by the Tokyu Meguro Line. All platforms are elevated, as is the station building.

=== Platforms ===
1
Tokyu Toyoko Line
- for Kikuna, and Yokohama
- Minatomirai Line for Motomachi-Chūkagai
- Sōtetsu Izumino Line for Shōnandai via the Tōkyū/Sōtetsu Shin-yokohama Line
2
Tokyu Meguro Line
- for Hiyoshi
- Tōkyū Shin-yokohama Line for Shin-Yokohama
- Sōtetsu Main Line for Ebina via the Tōkyū/Sōtetsu Shin-yokohama Line
3
Tokyu Meguro Line
for Ōokayama and Meguro
Namboku Line for Akabane-iwabuchi
Saitama Rapid Railway Line for Urawa-misono
Mita Line for Nishi-takashimadaira
4
Tokyu Toyoko Line
for Jiyūgaoka, Naka-Meguro, and Shibuya
Fukutoshin Line for Shinjuku-sanchome, Ikebukuro, Kotake-mukaihara, and Wakoshi
Seibu Ikebukuro Line for Hannō
Tōbu Tōjō Line for Shinrinkōen

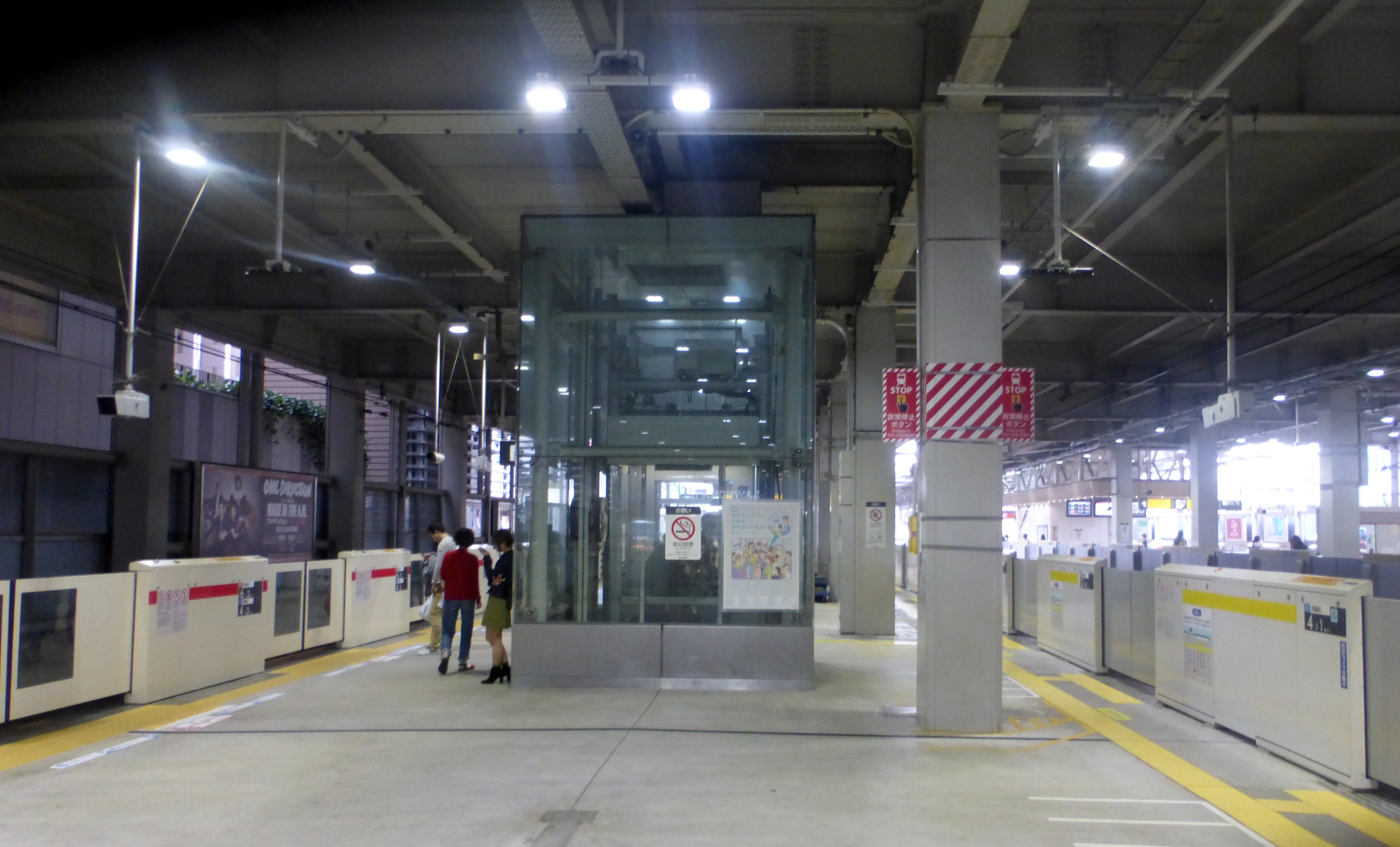
Tokyu platforms seen in 2015

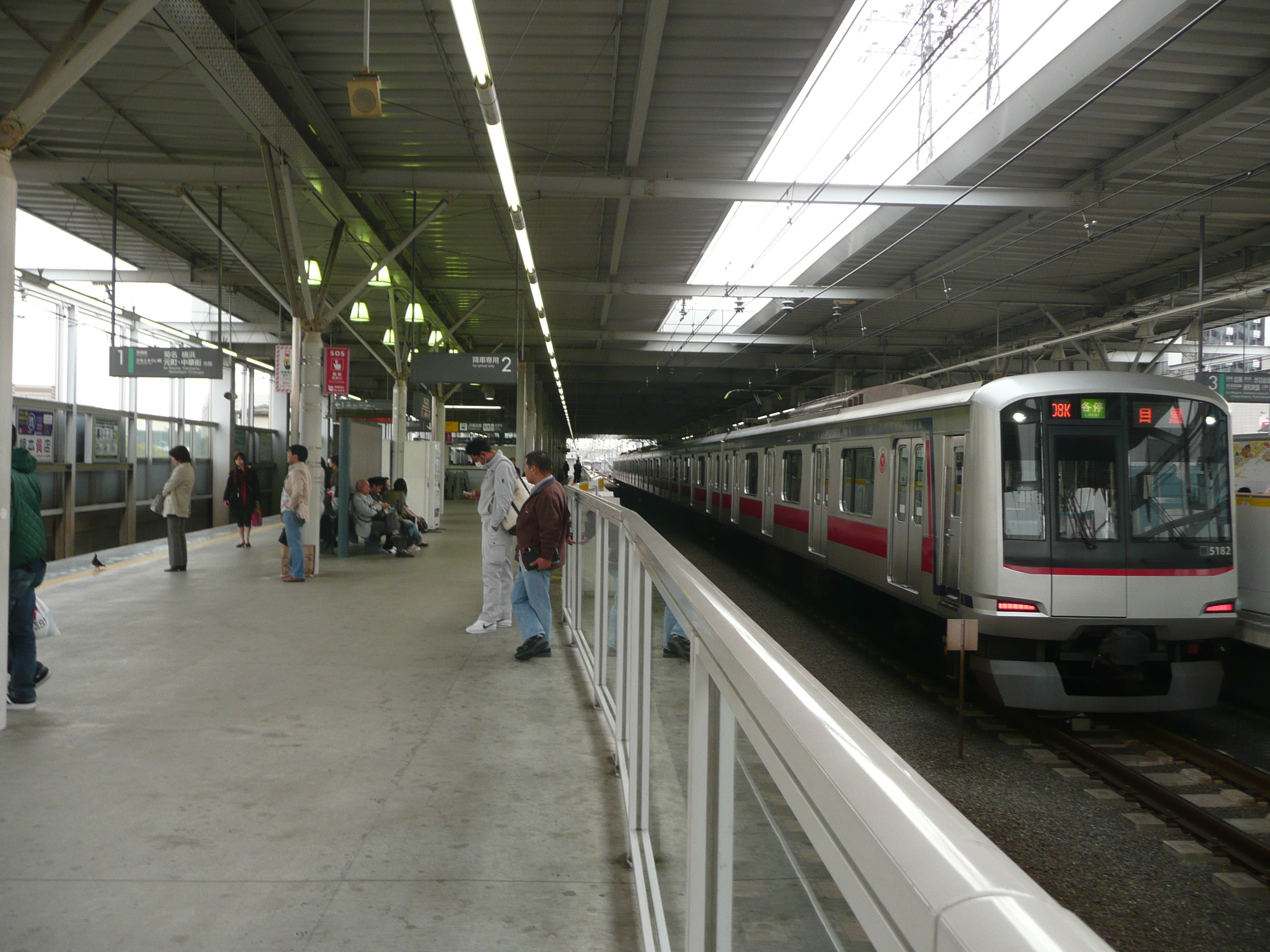
A Tokyu trainset departs the station

== History ==
The area around the station was served by the Nambu and Toyoko lines since the 1920s, but over an extended period of time it was integrated as Musashi-Kosugi Station in 1945. Since then, the station has functioned as a major transfer point for people residing in Kawasaki (along the Nambu Line) who commute to Tokyo.

Although the station was already a major station along the two lines in the 1990s, the station started further expansion of its role when the Meguro Line opened in 2000 with direct service to the Tokyo subway lines. The 2010 opening of the new platform for the Yokosuka Line and Shōnan-Shinjuku Line connected the station with many directions in Kantō region, including Narita Airport.

Musashi-Kosugi Station opened as Ground-mae Stop (グラウンド前停留場, Guraundomae-Teiryūjō) and as Musashi-Kosugi Stop (武蔵小杉停留場, Musashi-Kosugi-Teiryūjō) on the Nambu Railway on 1 November 1927. The nearby Kōgyōtoshi Station (工業都市駅, Kōgyōtoshi-eki) on the Toyoko Line opened on 11 December 1939. The Nambu Railway was nationalized on 1 April 1944, becoming part of into the Japanese Government Railway (JGR) system. Ground-mae Stop became Musashi-Kosugi Station, and the former Musashi-Kosugi Stop was abolished. After the end of World War II, JGR became the Japanese National Railways (JNR). On 16 June 1945, Musashi-Kosugi Station on the Toyoko Line opened, and on 31 March 1953, Kōgyōtoshi Station was abolished.

On 27 November 1988, grade separation work removed the level crossings on Tachikawa-bound tracks, and by 27 December 1988, grade separation work removed the level crossings on Kawasaki-bound tracks. Along with privatization and division of JNR, JR East started operating the former JNR portion of the station on 1 April 1987. On 6 August 2000, the Tokyu Meguro Line opened; the line was extended to connect to the Tokyu Meguro Line on 22 June 2008. The station was further expanded on 13 March 2010, when Yokosuka Line and Shōnan-Shinjuku Line trains began stopping.

Station numbering was introduced on all Tokyu Railway lines during fiscal 2012, with Musashi-Kosugi Station becoming "TY11" for the Toyoko Line and "MG11" for the Meguro Line.

Platform screen doors on the Nambu Line platforms were installed on 2 February 2022 and began operation on 13 March 2022.

On 18 December 2022, platform 3 on the Yokosuka Line was transitioned to a new side platform. Construction of the platform had been in progress since 2020. Under the updated configuration, the platform number assignments remain as-is.

== Passenger statistics ==
In the 2015 data available from Japan’s Ministry of Land, Infrastructure, Transport and Tourism, Musashi Kosugi → Nishi-Ōi was one of the train segments among Tokyo's most crowded train lines during rush hour.

In fiscal 2019, the JR station was used by an average of 129,194 passengers daily (boarding passengers only). Passenger usage for the JR East station has almost doubled since fiscal 1999, when the station was the 61st-busiest JR East station with an average of 64,165 passengers daily.

In fiscal 2019, the Tokyu Toyoko Line station was used by an average of 173,414 total passengers daily and the Meguro Line station was used by an average of 49,842 total passengers daily.

The daily passenger figures (boarding passengers only) for each operator in previous years are as shown below.

| Fiscal year | JR East | Tokyu |
|---|---|---|
| 2005 | 70,685 | 92,120 |
| 2010 | 99,617 | 95,668 |
| 2015 | 124,325 | 108,191 |

== Surrounding area ==
The area had until the late 2000s been a rather nondescript 'endless' suburbia, broken up only by the Tama River. At that time, the locals called the area Musako. However, with skyscraper construction giving the area an urban feel and outsider influx, the new local nickname Kosugi has emerged. The term Musashi refers to Nambu Line, the first train line through the area, which the line name itself is a reference to former Musashi Province, the southern rim which the line runs along. According to surveys, the district is considered among the more desirable in the Tokyo area, but its popularity waned somewhat after the area suffered flooding due to Typhoon Hagibis in October 2019.

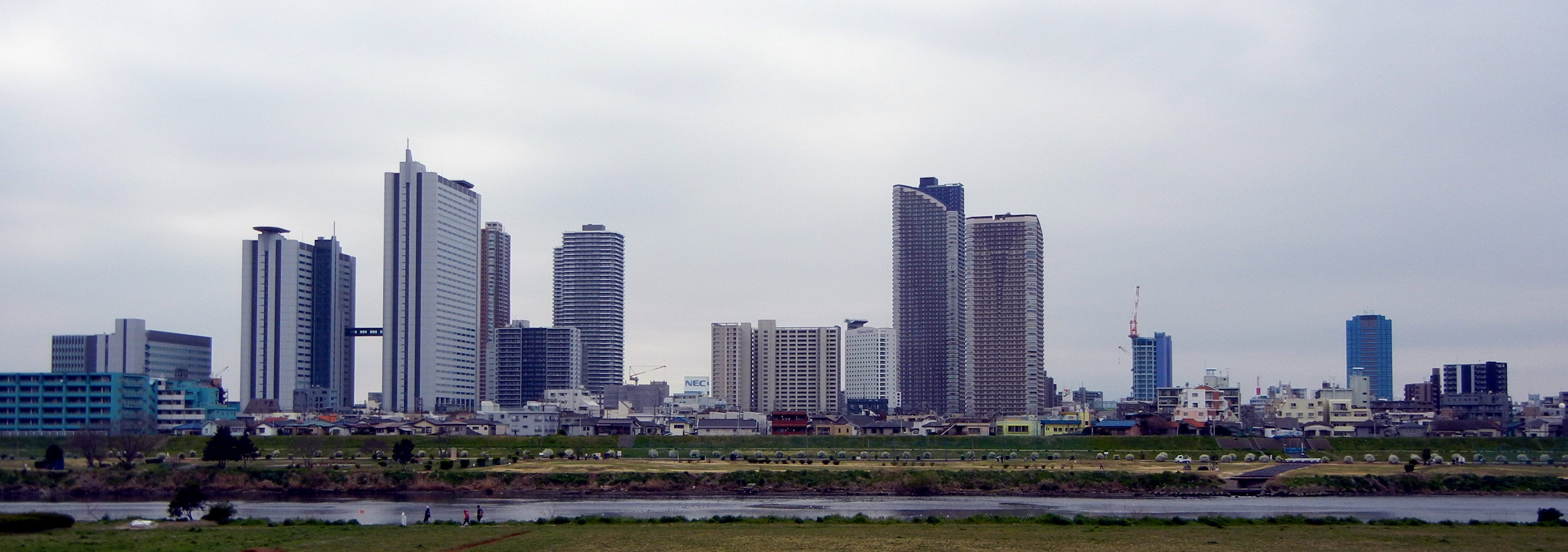
Musashi-Kosugi

- Nippon Medical School Musashi-kosugi Campus
- Nippon Medical University Musashi Kosugi Hospital
- Todoroki Ryokuchi athletic park

== See also ==
- List of railway stations in Japan
