= Doban =

Type of Japanese archaeological artefact

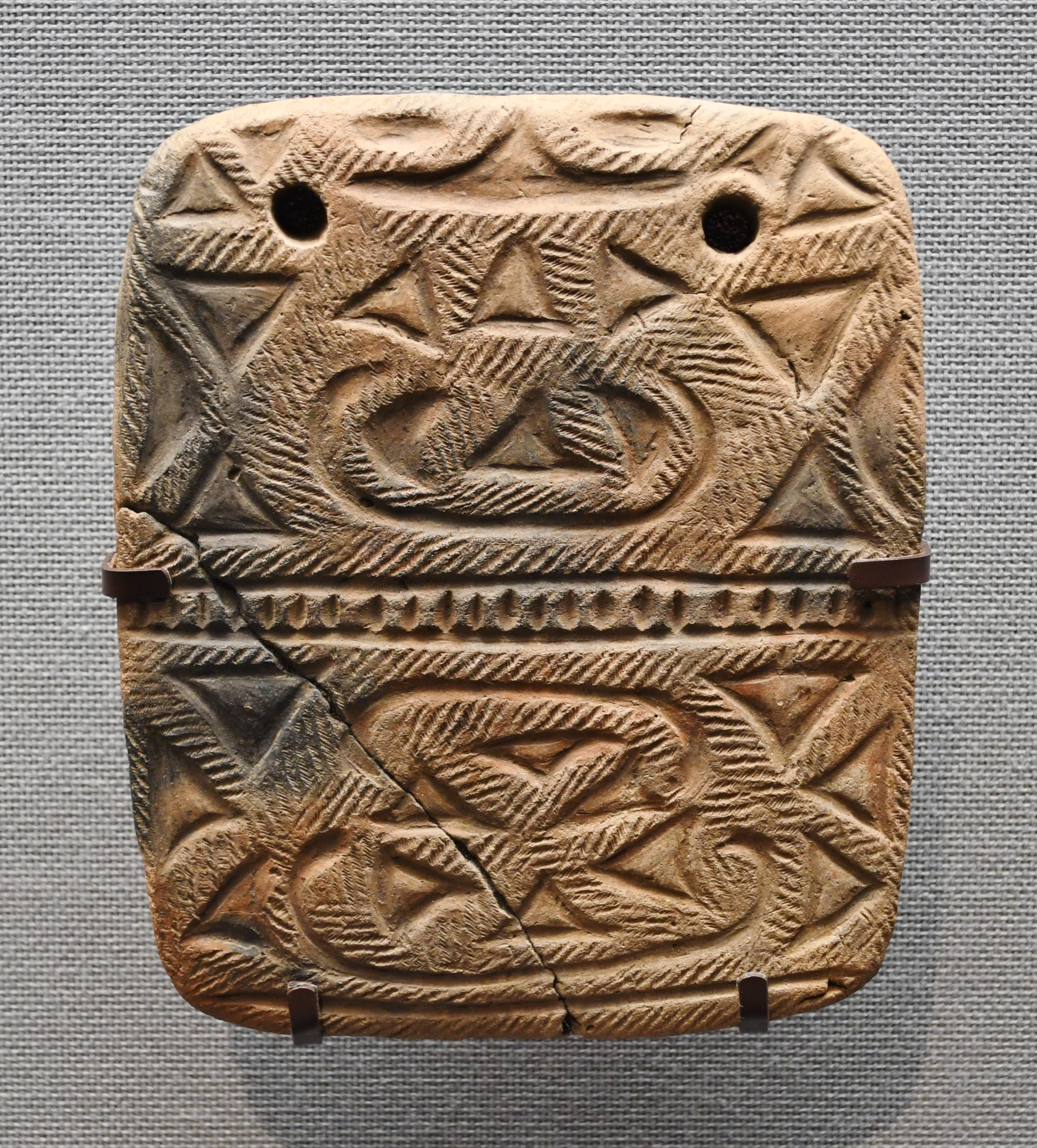
Final Jōmon doban (ICP) from Fukuda Shell Mound in Inashiki, Ibaraki Prefecture (16.7 by 14.0 by 1.7 centimetres [6.57 in × 5.51 in × 0.67 in]) (Tokyo National Museum)

Doban (土版), sometimes translated as "clay tablets", are a type of archaeological artefact known from Jōmon Japan. They have complex decorations and may have had ritual significance. They are the ceramic counterparts to the stone ganban.

== Name ==
Scholarship on doban began with Edward Sylvester Morse's discovery of five "curious clay objects" at the Ōmori Shell Mounds in Tokyo; these he styled "Tablets", "for want of a better name". Morse's clay "tablets" were subsequently translated into Japanese as doban (土版), the stone ganban (岩版) being named by analogy in 1896. Doban have since been translated back into English in a number of ways, including "clay tablets", "clay boards", "clay plaques", and "earthen plates".

== Overview ==
Found in Middle to Final Jōmon contexts, in particular the latter, doban take the form of a rectangular or oval clay tablet and are the ceramic counterpart to the stone ganban. They are known mainly from the Tōhoku and Kantō regions, with those of the former thought to have influenced those of the latter. In Tōhoku, ganban appear to have developed first. A study at the turn of the millennium was able to draw on some 266 clay and stone tablets from 70 sites across Aomori, Iwate, and Akita Prefectures.

Since the decoration on doban and ganban includes not only S- and 山-shaped patterns and the like and cord-impressions, but also in many cases representations of the face and body, it is possible their evolution was influenced by that of dogū, whether or not they served similar purposes. Like other clay and stone artefacts of a less obviously utilitarian nature, including dogū and sekibō, doban likely had a ritual function, although examples with holes through which a string could be threaded may have been worn as charms. The more three-dimensional ceramic representations of body parts sometimes referred to as doban, sometimes as dogū, may relate to fertility and childbirth or ill-health.

== Important Cultural Properties ==
Two doban have been designated Important Cultural Properties and a third is part of an Important Cultural Property (ICP) assemblage:

- Doban from Fukuda Shell Mound, Ibaraki Prefecture (Tokyo National Museum)
- Doban from Hirosaki, Aomori Prefecture (private collection)
- Doban from Umataka Site, Niigata Prefecture (Umataka Jōmon Museum)

== Gallery ==
Kamegaoka culture doban (c. 3000–2300 BP) from Araya Site, Aomori Prefecture (Kyushu National Museum)

Doban (c. 5000 BP) from Umataka Site, Niigata Prefecture (Umataka Jōmon Museum)

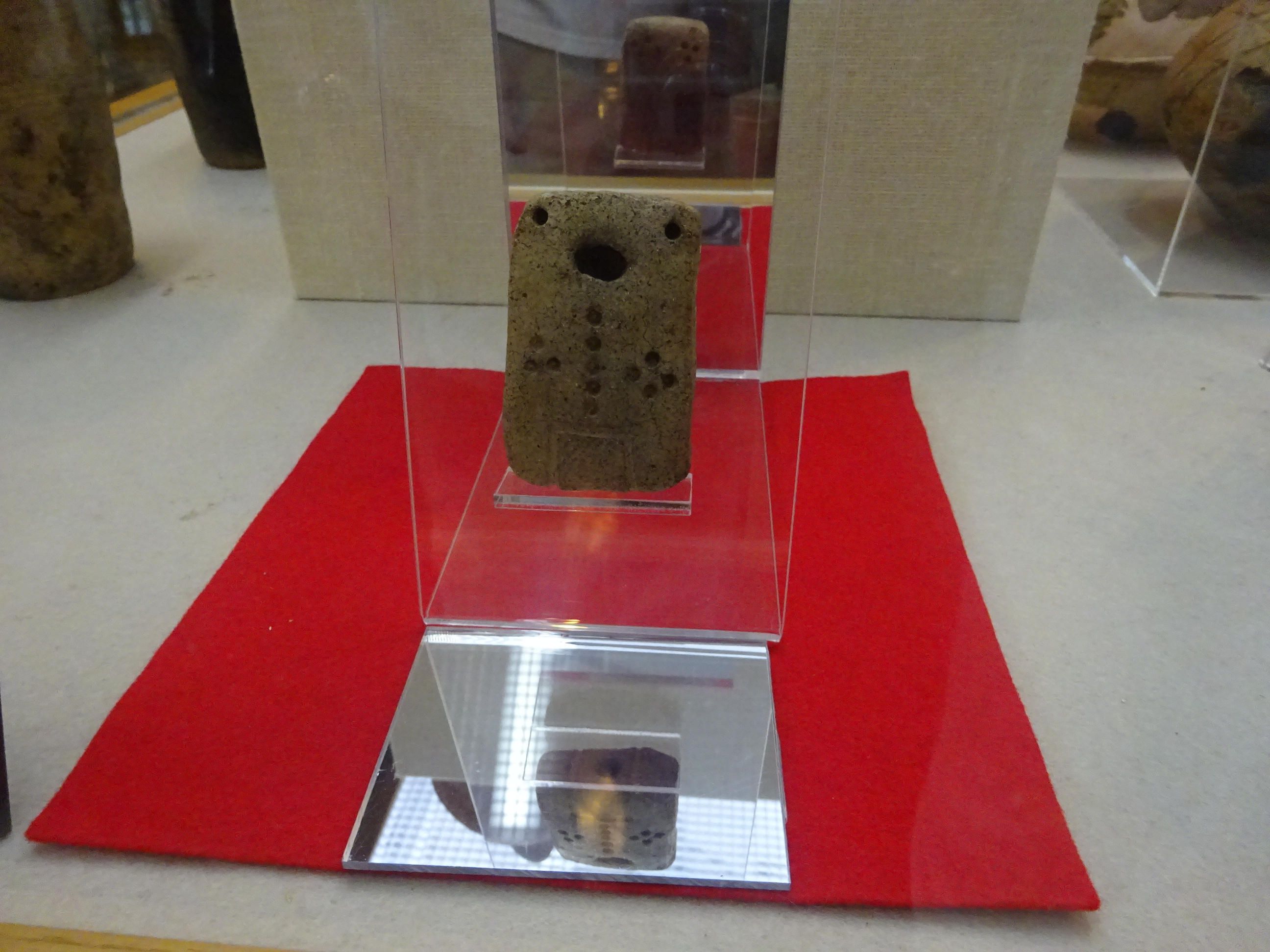
Doban from the Ōyu Stone Circles, Akita Prefecture

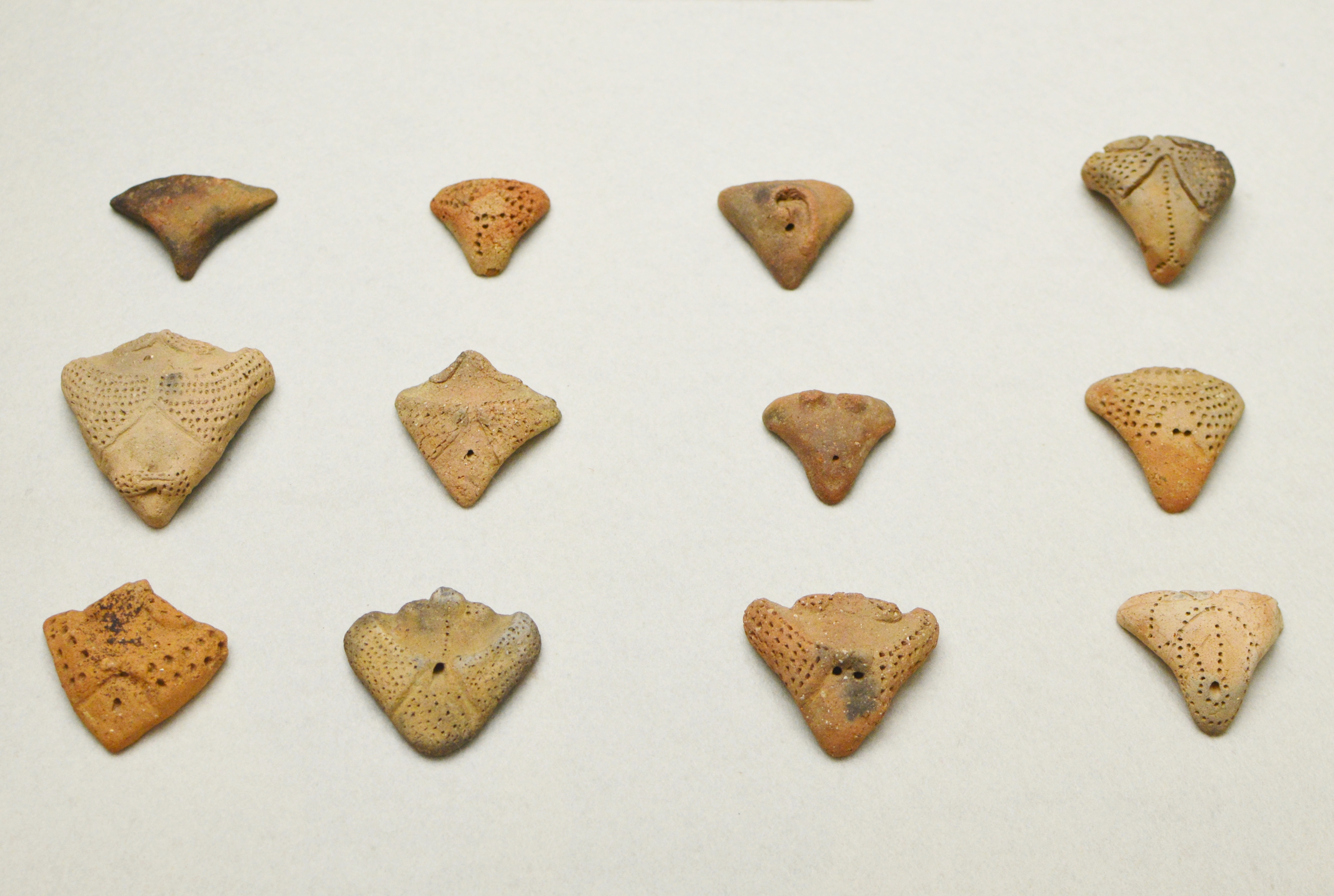
Female body parts from Sasayama Site, Niigata Prefecture

== See also ==
- List of National Treasures of Japan (archaeological materials)
- Jōmon period sites
- Clay tablet
- Jōmon people
