= Sekibō =

Type of Japanese archaeological artefact

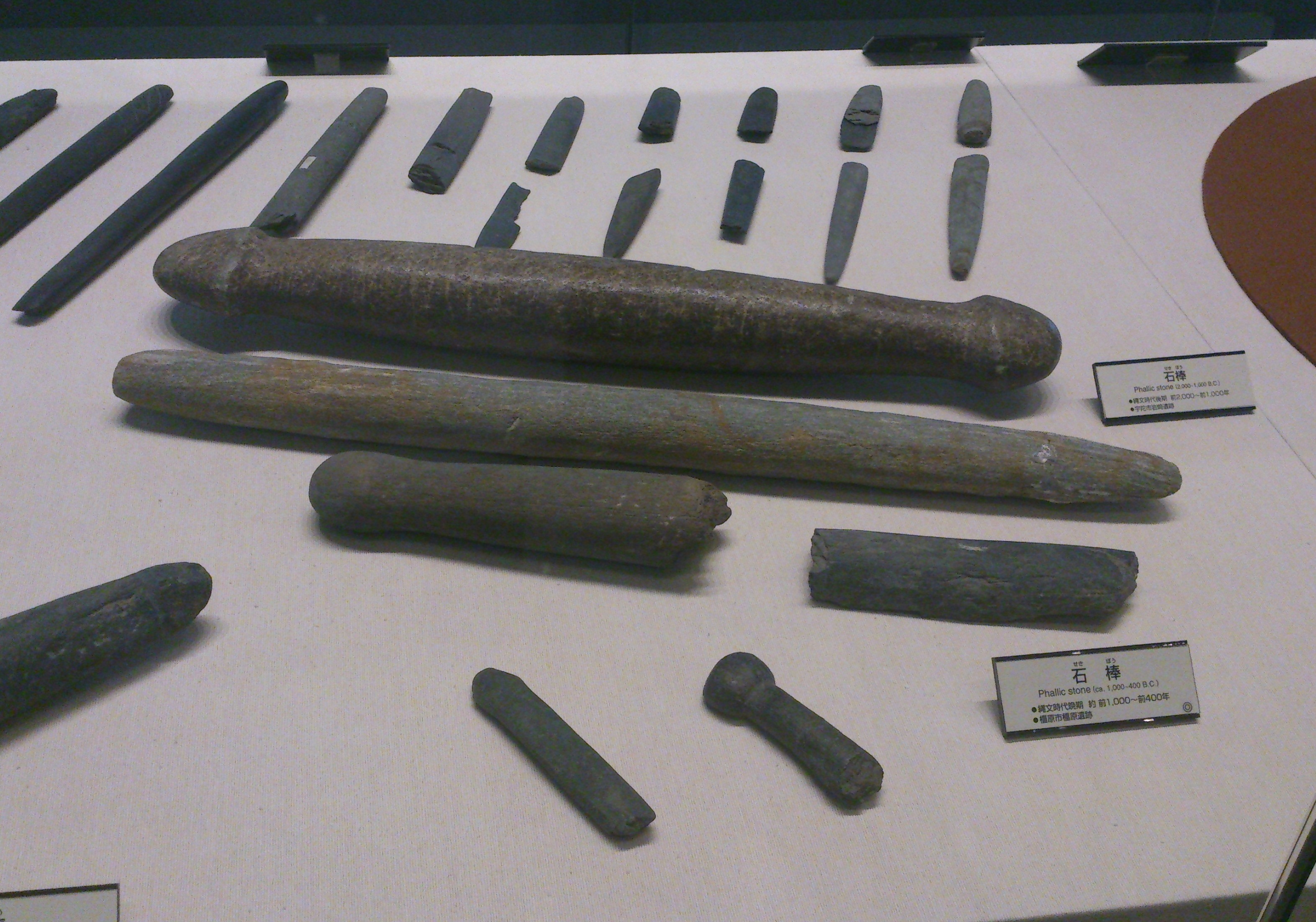
Late and Final Jōmon sekibō, here labelled "phallic stones" (The Museum, Archaeological Institute of Kashihara, Nara Prefecture)

Sekibō (石棒), sometimes translated as "stone rods", are a type of archaeological artefact from Jōmon Japan, with examples known also from the Yayoi period.

== Overview ==
Larger Middle to Late Jōmon sekibō, one metre (3 ft 3 in) or more in length, sometimes stood upright at the centre of arrangements of stones or in pit-dwellings, while smaller Late and Final Jōmon examples are associated with sekken and sekitō stone blades. Due to their shape, sekibō are often interpreted as symbols of male sexuality, as opposed to the more female dogū and gangū. Similarly to these clay and stone figurines, many sekibō show signs of intentional damage, perhaps from ritual practices relating to fertility. Sekibō may be the antecedents of the phalli found at shrines and festivals in present-day Japan.

== Important Cultural Properties ==
Four sekibō from Midorikawa Higashi Site in Kunitachi, Tokyo, held at Kunitachi Local Museum, have been collectively designated an Important Cultural Property.

== See also ==
- List of National Treasures of Japan (archaeological materials)
- Jōmon period sites
- Ganban
- Gangū
