= Matsumoto City Museum of Archaeology =

Archaeology museum in Matsumoto, Nagano, Japan

- 松本市立考古博物館
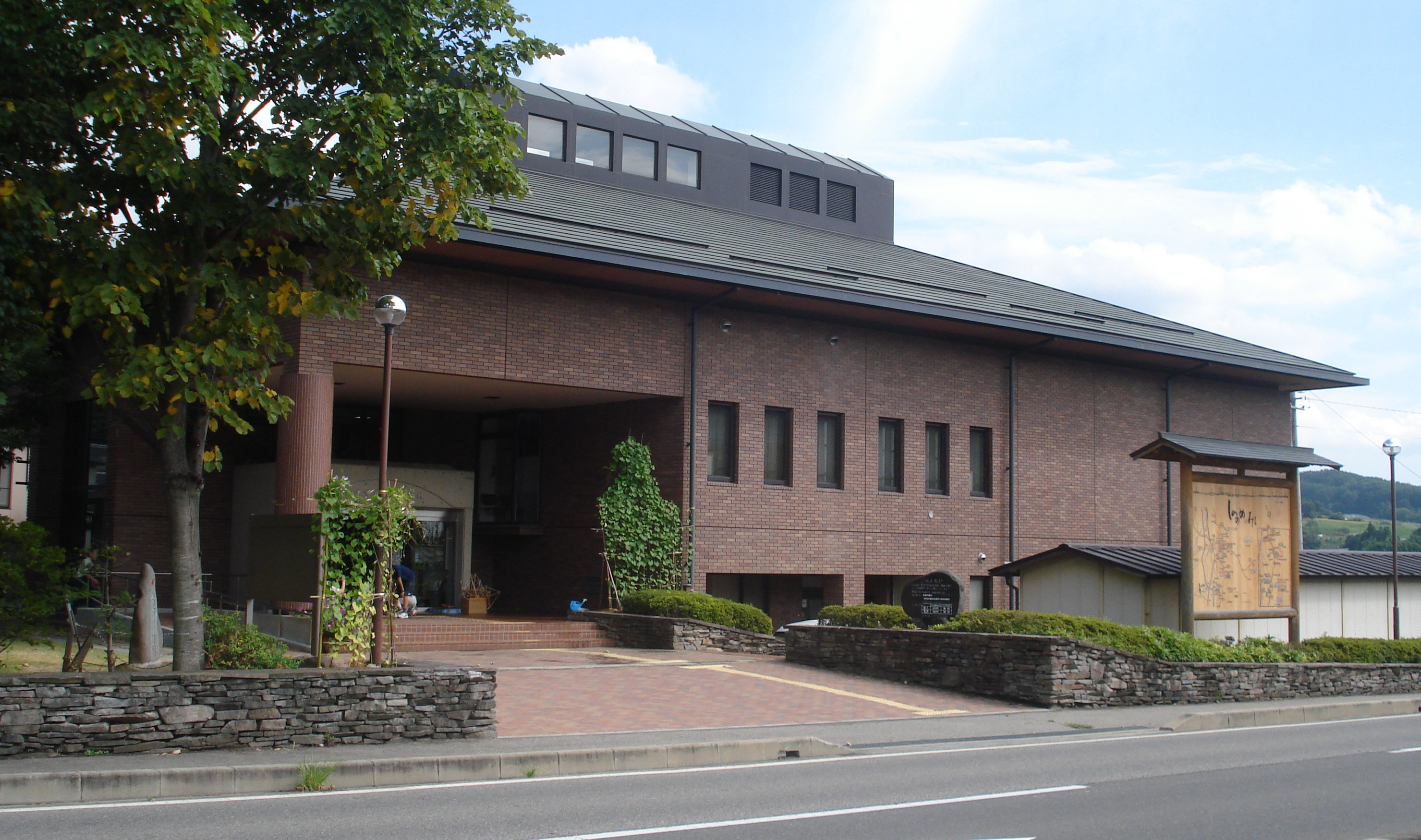
- Interactive map of the Matsumoto City Museum of Archaeology area

General information
- Location: 3738-1 Nakayama, Matsumoto, Nagano Prefecture, Japan
- Coordinates: 36°11′35″N 138°00′05″E
- Opened: 1986

Website
- Official website (in Japanese)

Matsumoto City Museum of Archaeology (松本市立考古博物館, Matsumoto Shiritsu Kōko Hakubutsukan) opened in Matsumoto, Nagano Prefecture, Japan in 1986, superseding and replacing Nakayama Kōkokan, which opened in Nakayama Elementary School in 1931. The collection and displays relate to the archaeology of the area, including Jōmon pottery and a doban from the Eriana Site and Haji pottery, weapons, bronze mirrors, and glass beads from Kōbōyama Kofun.

== See also ==
- Nagano Prefectural Museum of History
- Ogasawara clan castle sites
- Japan Ukiyo-e Museum
- Matsumoto Kaidō
