= Gangu =

Gangu can refer to:

- Gangu County, a county in the province of Gansu, China
- Gangū, stone figurines from Jōmon Japan
