= Yaho Station =

Railway station in Kunitachi, Tokyo, Japan

JN23 Yaho Station 谷保駅
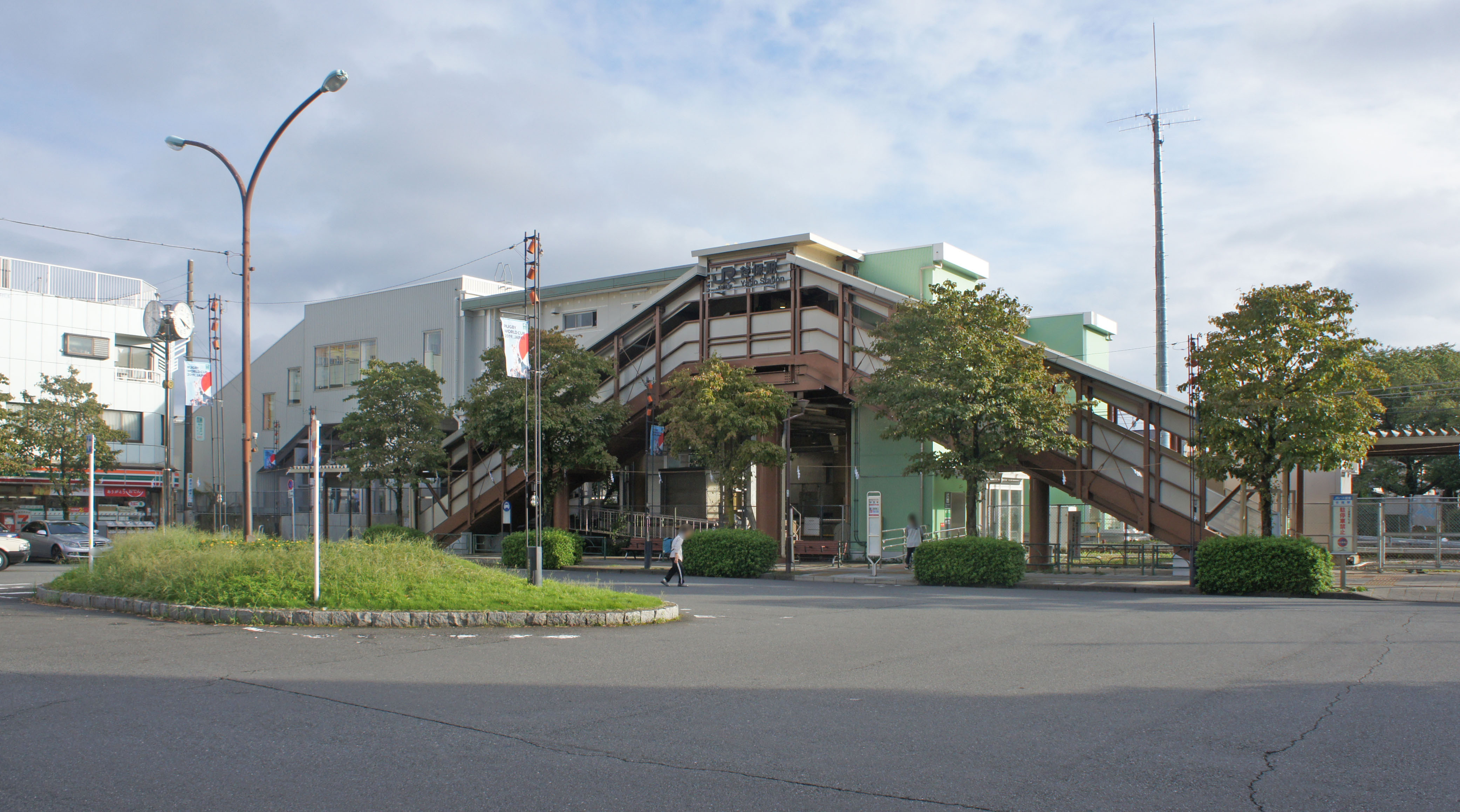
- Yaho Station north exit, September 2019

General information
- Location: 5012 Yaho, Kunitachi-shi, Tokyo 186-0003; Japan
- Coordinates: 35.6813°N 139.4470°E
- Operator: JR East
- Line: Nambu Line
- Distance: 31.6 km from Kawasaki
- Platforms: 2 side platforms
- Connections: Bus stop

Other information
- Status: Staffed
- Website: Official website

History
- Opened: 11 December 1929

Passengers
- FY2019: 10,390

Services
Preceding station	JR East	Following station
Yagawa JN24 towards Tachikawa	Nambu Line Local	Nishifu JN22 towards Kawasaki
Location
- Location within Tokyo Location within Japan

Yaho Station (谷保駅, Yaho-eki) is a passenger railway station located in the city of Kunitachi, Tokyo, operated by East Japan Railway Company (JR East).

== Lines ==
Yaho Station is served by the Nambu Line from Kawasaki to Tachikawa. It is 33.0 kilometers from the terminus of the Nambu Line at Kawasaki Station.

== Station layout ==
Yaho Station has two opposed ground-level side platforms serving two tracks, with an elevated station build above and across the platforms. The station is staffed.

=== Platforms ===
1	Nambu Line	for Nishi-Kunitachi and Tachikawa
2	Nambu Line	for Fuchū-Hommachi and Kawasaki

== History ==
The station opened on 11 December 1929. With the privatization of JNR on 1 April 1987, the station came under the control of JR East.

== Passenger statistics ==
In fiscal 2019, the station was used by an average of 10,390 passengers daily (boarding passengers only).

== Surrounding area ==
The area around the station is known for the Yaho Tenman-gū shrine, which is a short walk from the station.

== See also ==
- List of railway stations in Japan
