= Nishifu Station =

Railway station in Fuchū, Tokyo, Japan

JN22 Nishifu Station 西府駅
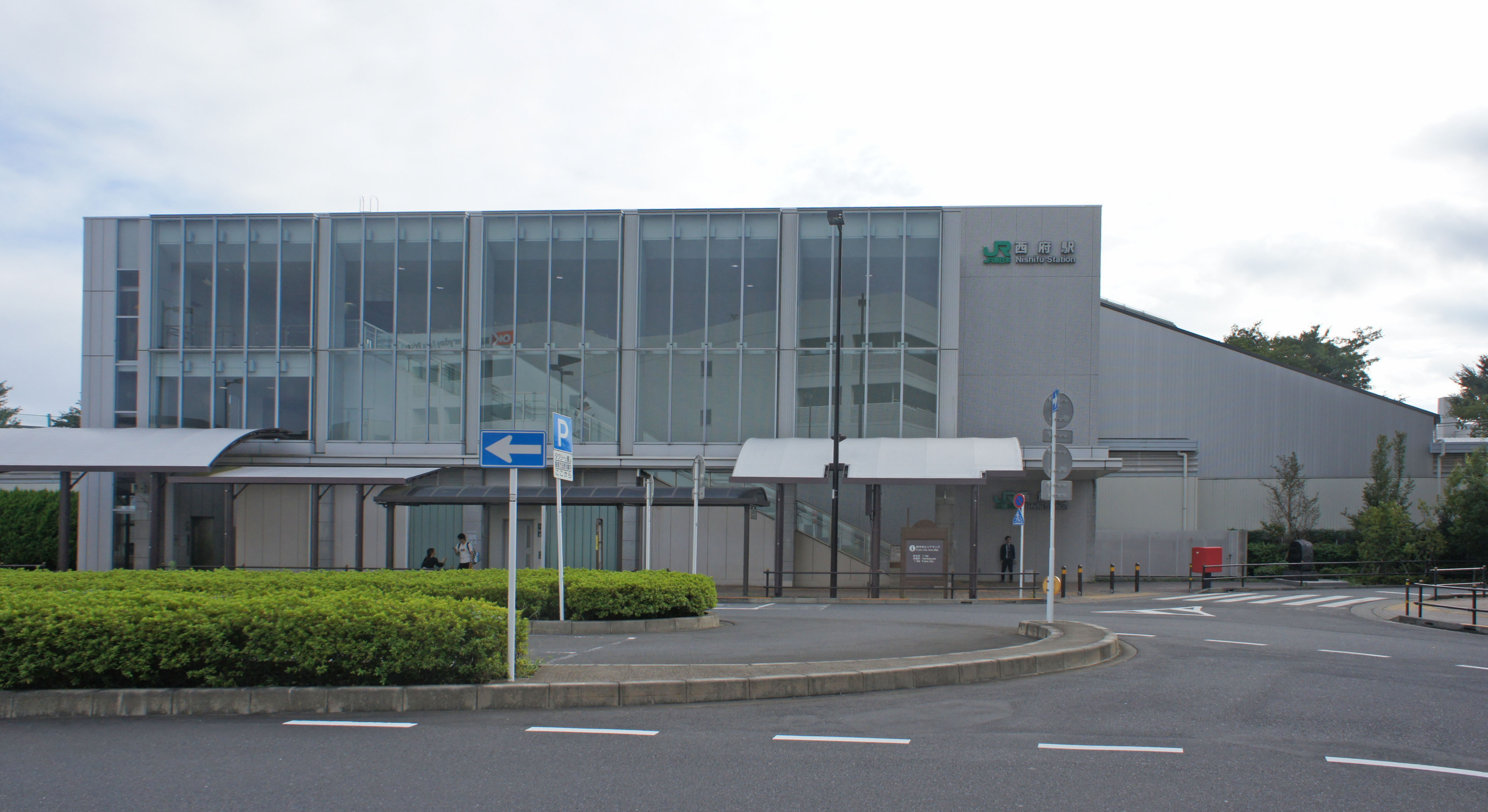
- Nishifu Station, September 2019

General information
- Location: 1-50 Honjuku, Fuchū-shi, Tokyo 183-0032; Japan
- Coordinates: 35°40′15″N 139°27′27″E
- Operator: JR East
- Line: Nambu Line
- Distance: 30.0 km from Kawasaki
- Platforms: 2 side platforms
- Connections: Bus stop

Other information
- Status: Staffed
- Website: Official website

History
- Opened: 14 March 2009

Passengers
- FY2019: 10,664

Services
Preceding station	JR East	Following station
Yaho JN23 towards Tachikawa	Nambu Line Local	Bubaigawara JN21 towards Kawasaki
Location
- Location within Tokyo Location within Japan

Nishifu Station (西府駅, Nishifu-eki) is a passenger railway station located in the city of Fuchū, Tokyo, Japan, operated by East Japan Railway Company (JR East).

== Lines ==
Nishifu Station is served by the Nambu Line, and is situated 30.0 km from the terminus of the line at Kawasaki Station

== Station layout ==
The station consists of two ground-level opposed side platforms, with an elevated station building above the tracks and platforms. The station is staffed.

=== Platforms ===
1	Nambu Line	for Fuchū-Hommachi and Kawasaki
2	Nambu Line	for Nishi-Kunitachi and Tachikawa

== History ==
The station opened on 14 March 2009.

== Passenger statistics ==
In fiscal 2019, the station was used by an average of 10,664 passengers daily (boarding passengers only). The passenger figures (boarding passengers only) for previous years are as shown below.

Fiscal year	Daily average
2010	7,675
2015	10,261

== Surrounding area ==
- National Route 20
- Chuo Expressway National Fuchu Interchange
- NEC (NEC) Fuchu Plant

== See also ==
- List of railway stations in Japan
