= Kunitachi Local Museum =

Museum in Kunitachi, Tokyo, Japan

- くにたち郷土文化館
- Interactive map of the Kunitachi Local Museum area

General information
- Location: 6231 Yaho, Kunitachi, Tokyo, Japan
- Coordinates: 35°40′44″N 139°25′57″E
- Opened: 16 November 1994

Website
- Official website (in Japanese)

Kunitachi Local Museum (くにたち郷土文化館, Kunitachi Kyōdo Bunkakan) opened in Kunitachi, Tokyo, Japan in 1994. The collection and displays relate to the natural and cultural history of the area, and include four Jōmon sekibō from Midorikawa Higashi Site that have been collectively designated an Important Cultural Property.

== See also ==
- List of museums in Tokyo
- Yabo Tenmangū
