= Umataka Jōmon Museum =

Museum in Nagaoka, Niigata, Japan

- 馬高縄文館
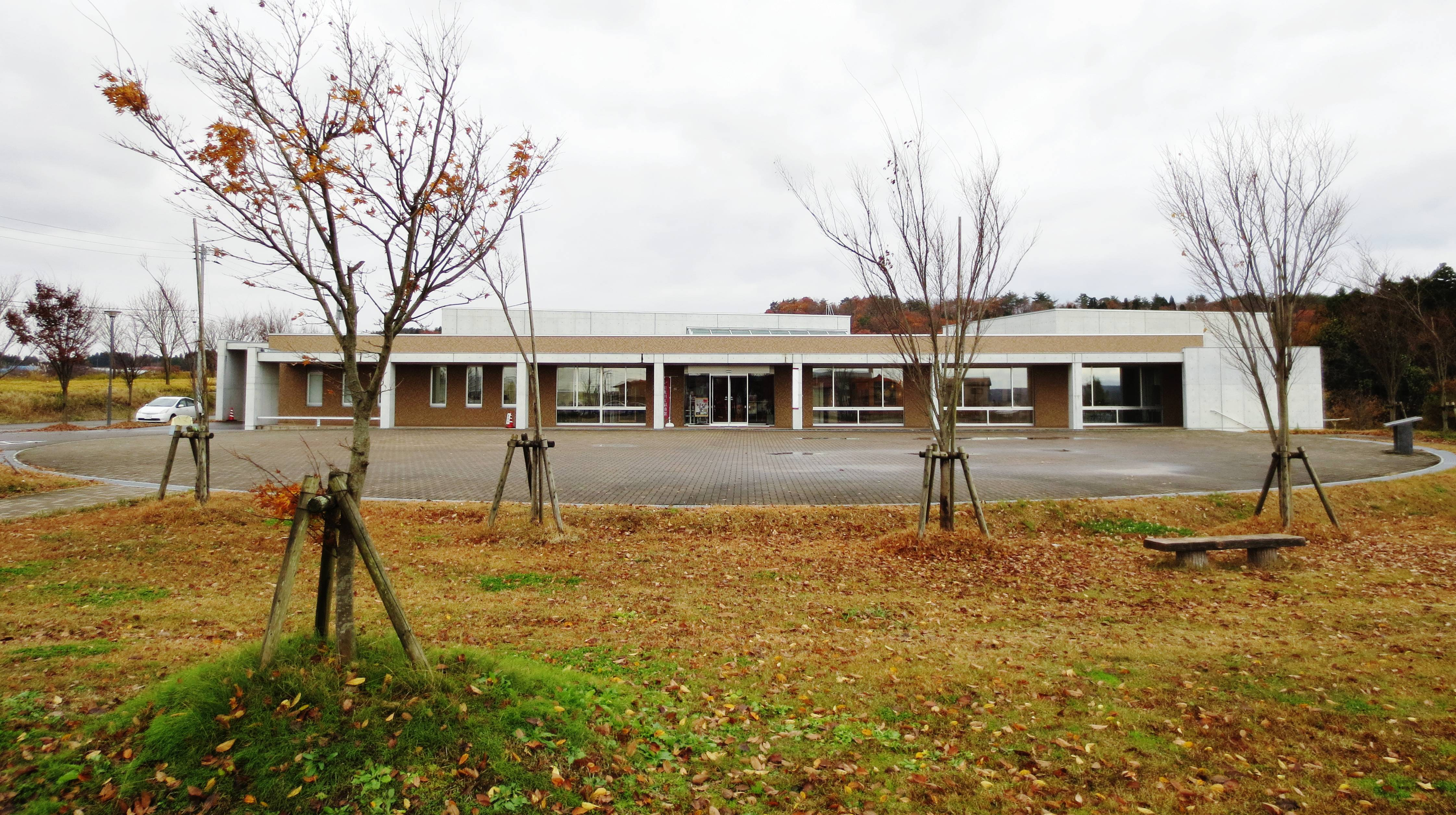
- Interactive map of the Umataka Jōmon Museum area

General information
- Location: 1-3060-1 Sekihara-machi, Nagaoka, Niigata Prefecture, Japan
- Coordinates: 37°26′48″N 138°46′07″E
- Opened: September 2009

Website
- Official website (in Japanese)

Umataka Jōmon Museum (馬高縄文館, Umataka Jōmon-kan) opened in Nagaoka, Niigata Prefecture, Japan in 2009. It serves as the guidance facility for Umataka-Sanjūinaba Site and exhibits flame- and crown- type vessels and finds from other Jōmon sites in the area, including Fujihashi Site.

== See also ==
- Niigata Prefectural Museum of History
- Japan Heritage ("story" #026)
- Hachimanbayashi Kanga ruins
- Nagaoka Castle
- Araya Site
