= Kazuo Shinohara =

Japanese architect

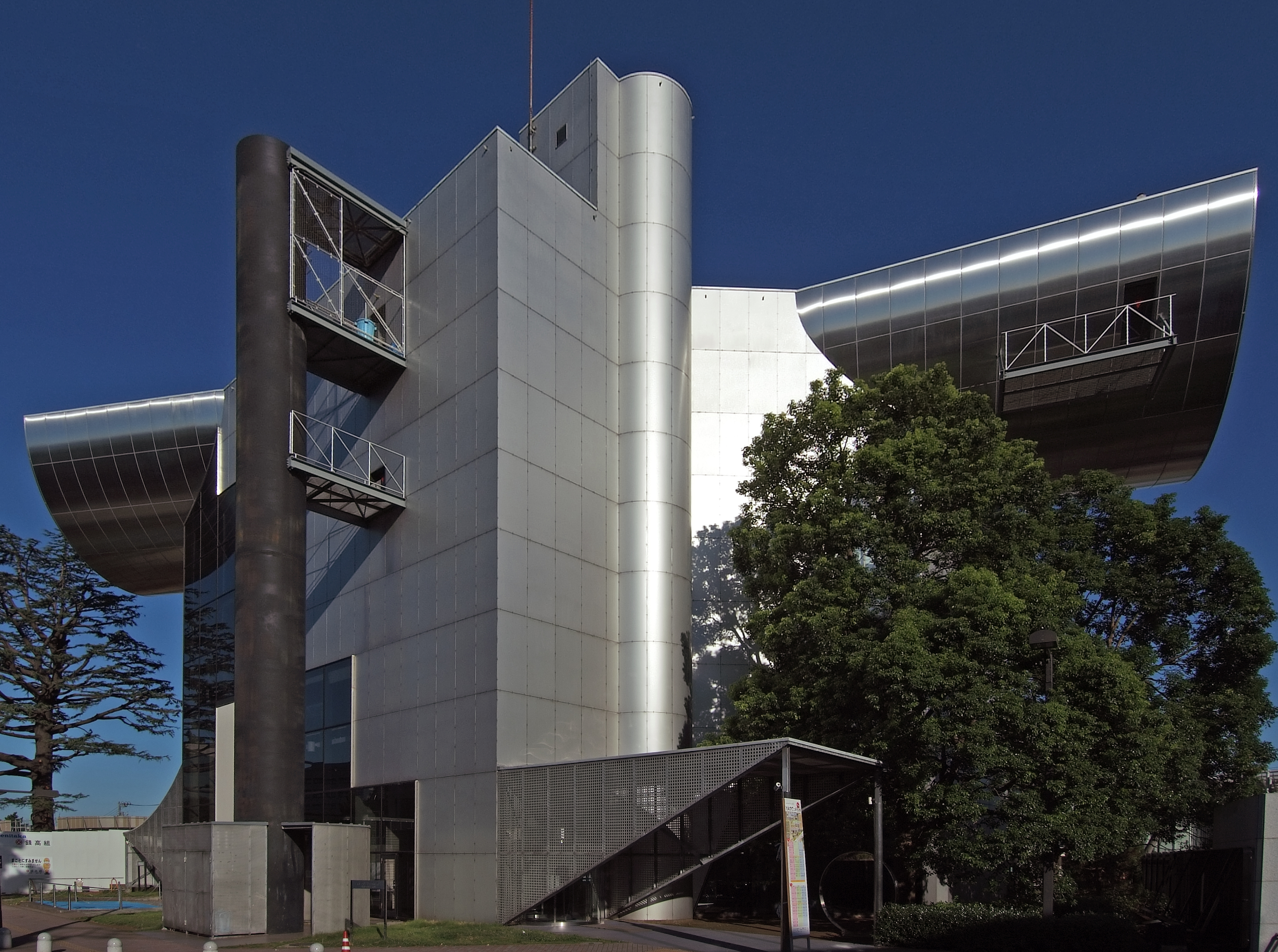
Tokyo Institute of Technology Centennial Hall

Kazuo Shinohara (篠原 一男, Shinohara Kazuo; April 2, 1925 – July 15, 2006) was a Japanese architect, forming what is now widely known as the "Shinohara School", which has been linked to the works of Toyo Ito, Kazunari Sakamoto and Itsuko Hasegawa, Kazuyo Sejima, Ryue Nishizawa. As architectural critic Thomas Daniell put it, "A key figure who explicitly rejected Western influences yet appears on almost every branch of the family tree of contemporary Japanese architecture... is Kazuo Shinohara... His effects on the discipline as a theorist, designer and teacher have been immense." He studied at Tokyo Institute of Technology, (TIT) finishing in 1953, and going on to become professor in 1970. He established his own practice in 1954, going on to design more than 30 residential buildings, as well as many key public buildings across Japan.

His work is generally classified as having strong qualities of lucidity and ephemerality, and for these reasons is often seen as ideologically influential on Toyo Ito's work.

He was awarded the Architectural Institute of Japan's (AIJ) grand prize in 2005. In 2010 the Biennale di Venezia awarded a special commemorative Golden Lion in memory of Kazuo Shinohara.

== List of selected works ==
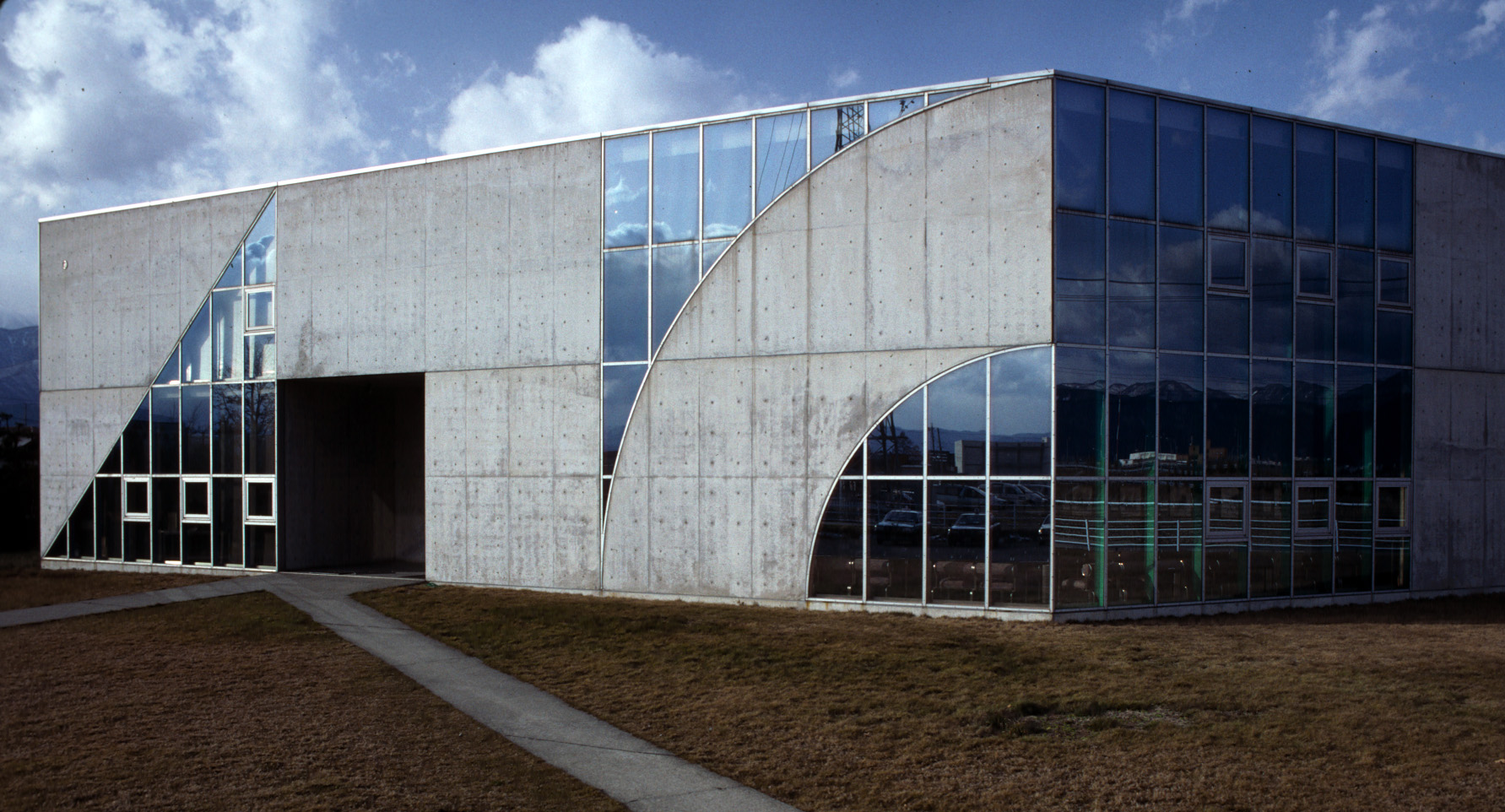
Japan Ukiyo-e Museum in Matsumoto (1982)

- Kugayama House (1954)
- House in Komae (1960)
- Umbrella House (1961)
- House with a Big Roof (1961)
- House with an Earthen Floor (1963)
- North House in Hanayama (1965)
- House in White (1966)
- House of Earth (1966)
- Uncompleted House (1970)
- Prism House (1974)
- Tanikawa House (1974)
- Uehara House (1976)
- House Under High Voltage Lines (1981)
- House in Yokohama (1985)
- Japan Ukiyo-e Museum in Matsumoto (1982)
- Tokyo Institute of Technology (TIT) Centennial Hall; Tokyo (1987)
- House on a Curved Road (1987)
- Kumamoto Police Station (1990)
- K2 Building; Osaka (1990)

== Bibliography ==
- Massip-Bosch, Enric (2015). Five Forms of Emotion: Kazuo Shinohara and the House as a Work of Art. Barcelona: Universitat Politècnica de Catalunya.
- Dehli, Christian; Grolimund, Andrea (2019). Kazuo Shinohara: 3 Houses. Luzern: Quart Verlag. ISBN 978-3-03761-167-8.
- Dehli, Christian; Grolimund, Andrea; Stewart, David B. (2019). Kazuo Shinohara: View from This Side. Zürich: Rollo Press. ISBN 978-3-906213-28-6.
- Jacquet, Benoit; Matsuzaki, Teruaki; Tardits, Manuel (2021). The Carpenter and the Architect: A history of wood construction in Japan. Lausanne: EPFL Press. ISBN 978-2-88915-445-6.
- Joanelly, Tibor (2020). Shinoharistics: An Essay About a House. Zürich: Kommode Verlag. ISBN 978-3-9525014-7-4.
- Dehli, Christian; Grolimund, Andrea (2022). Kazuo Shinohara: The Umbrella House Project. Weil am Rhein: Vitra Design Museum. ISBN 978-3-94585-255-2.

== Exhibitions ==
- 2010 - Les Rencontres d'Arles festival. Arles, France.
- 2025 - Kazuo Shinohara: Inscribe Eternity in Space. Tokyo, 17.04.2025-22.06.2025. Curated by Shin-ichi Okuyama, Momoyo Kaijima and Seng Kuan.
- 2026 - Kazuo Shinohara: The House as a Work of Art. Barcelona, 09.04.2026-17.05.2026. Curated by Enric Massip-Bosch.
