= Yagawa Station =

Railway station in Kunitachi, Tokyo, Japan

JN24 Yagawa Station 矢川駅
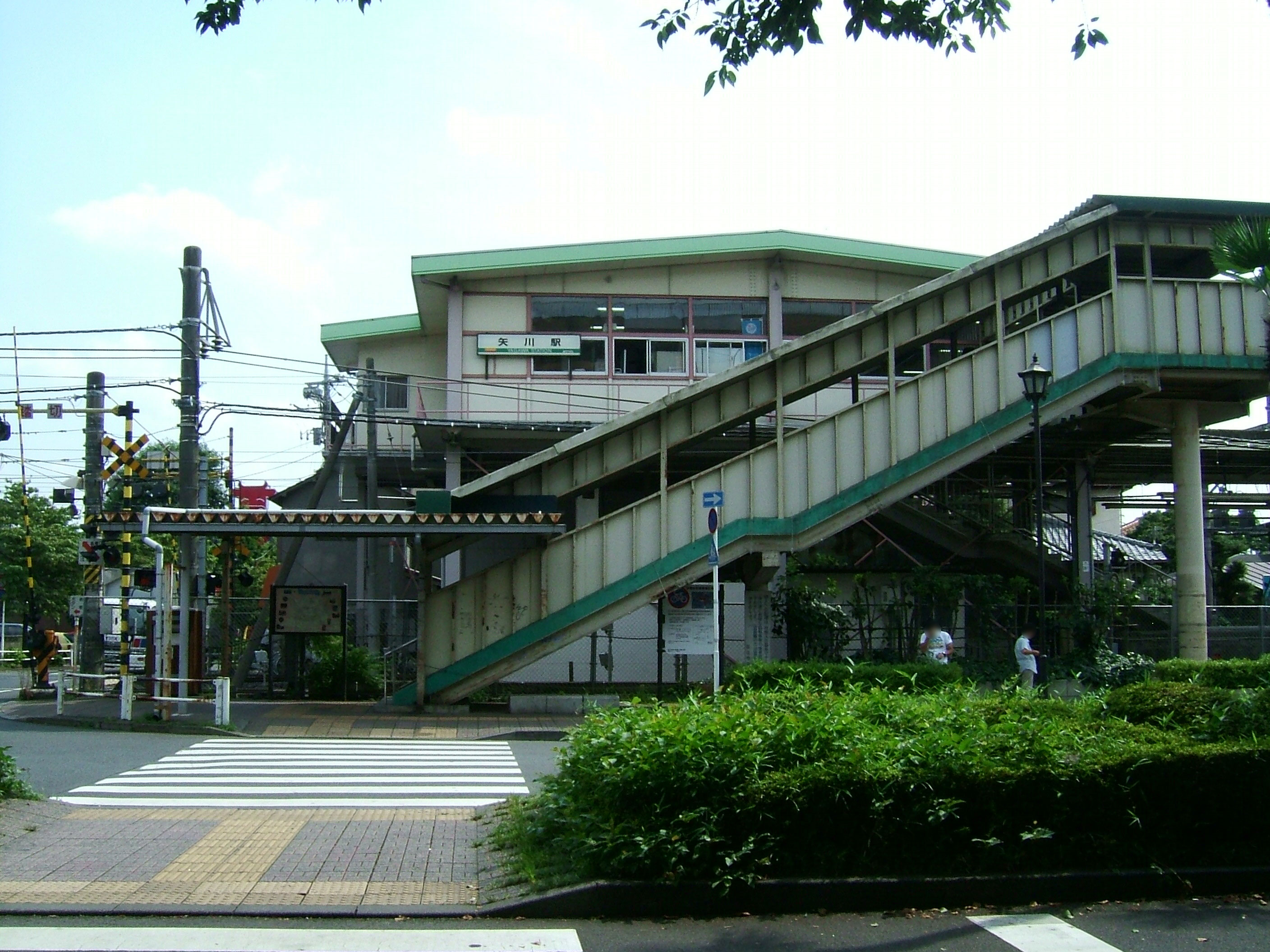
- Yagawa Station building, September 2006

General information
- Location: 660 Ishida, Kunitachi-shi, Tokyo 186-0003; Japan
- Coordinates: 35.68495°N 139.4321°E
- Operator: JR East
- Line: Nambu Line
- Distance: 33.0 km from Kawasaki
- Platforms: 1 island platform

Other information
- Status: Staffed
- Website: Official website

History
- Opened: 20 May 1932

Passengers
- FY2019: 8541

Services
Preceding station	JR East	Following station
Nishi-Kunitachi JN25 towards Tachikawa	Nambu Line Local	Yaho JN23 towards Kawasaki
Location
- Location within Tokyo Location within Japan

Yagawa Station (矢川駅, Yagawa-eki) is a passenger railway station located in the city of Kunitachi, Tokyo, Japan, operated by East Japan Railway Company (JR East).

== Lines ==
Yagawa Station is served by the Nambu Line from Kawasaki to Tachikawa. It is 33.0 kilometers from the terminus of the Nambu Line at Kawasaki Station.

== Station layout ==
Yagawa Station has a single ground-level island platform serving two tracks, with an elevated station build above and across the platforms. The station is staffed.

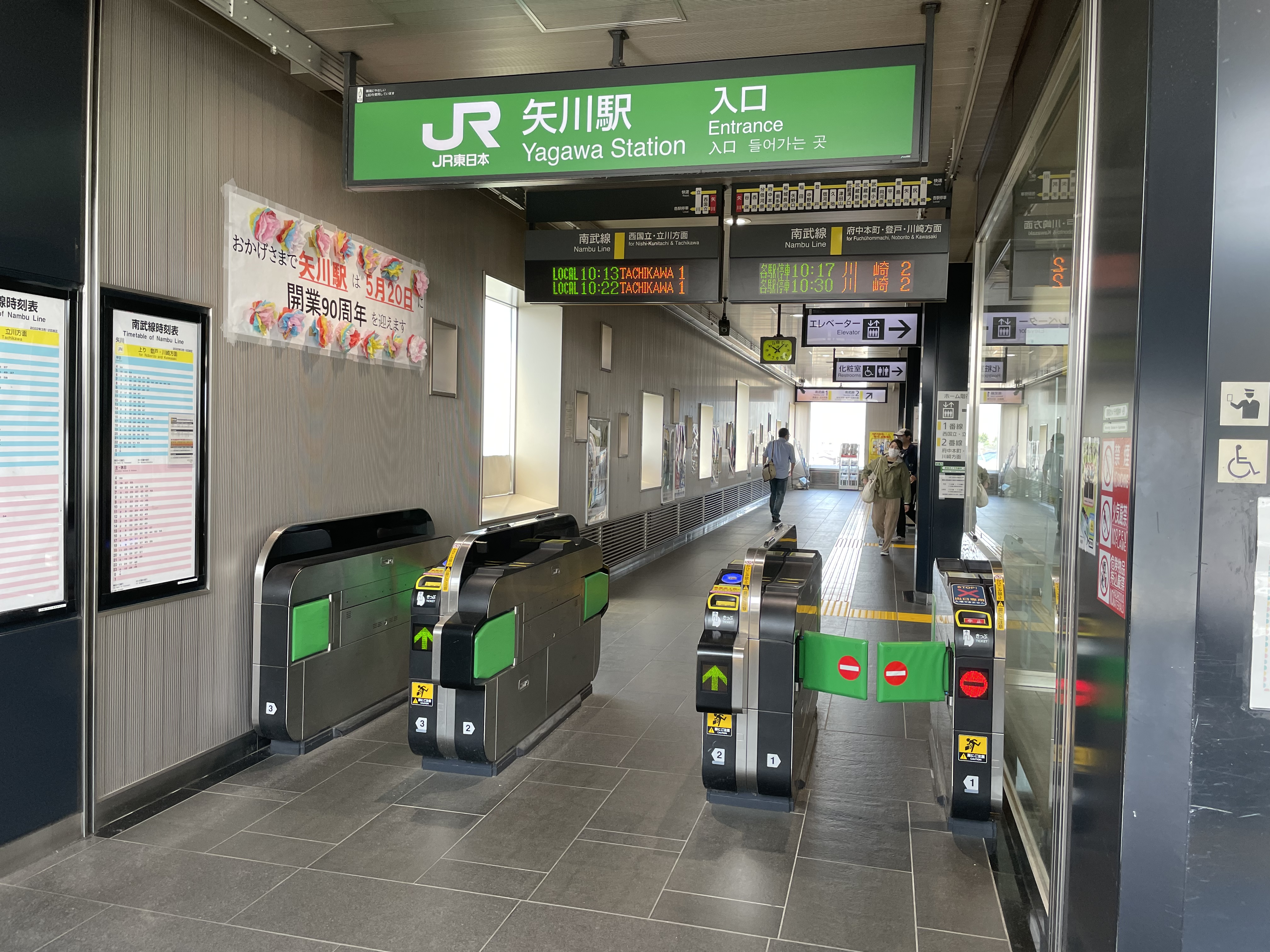
Ticket gates, May 2022

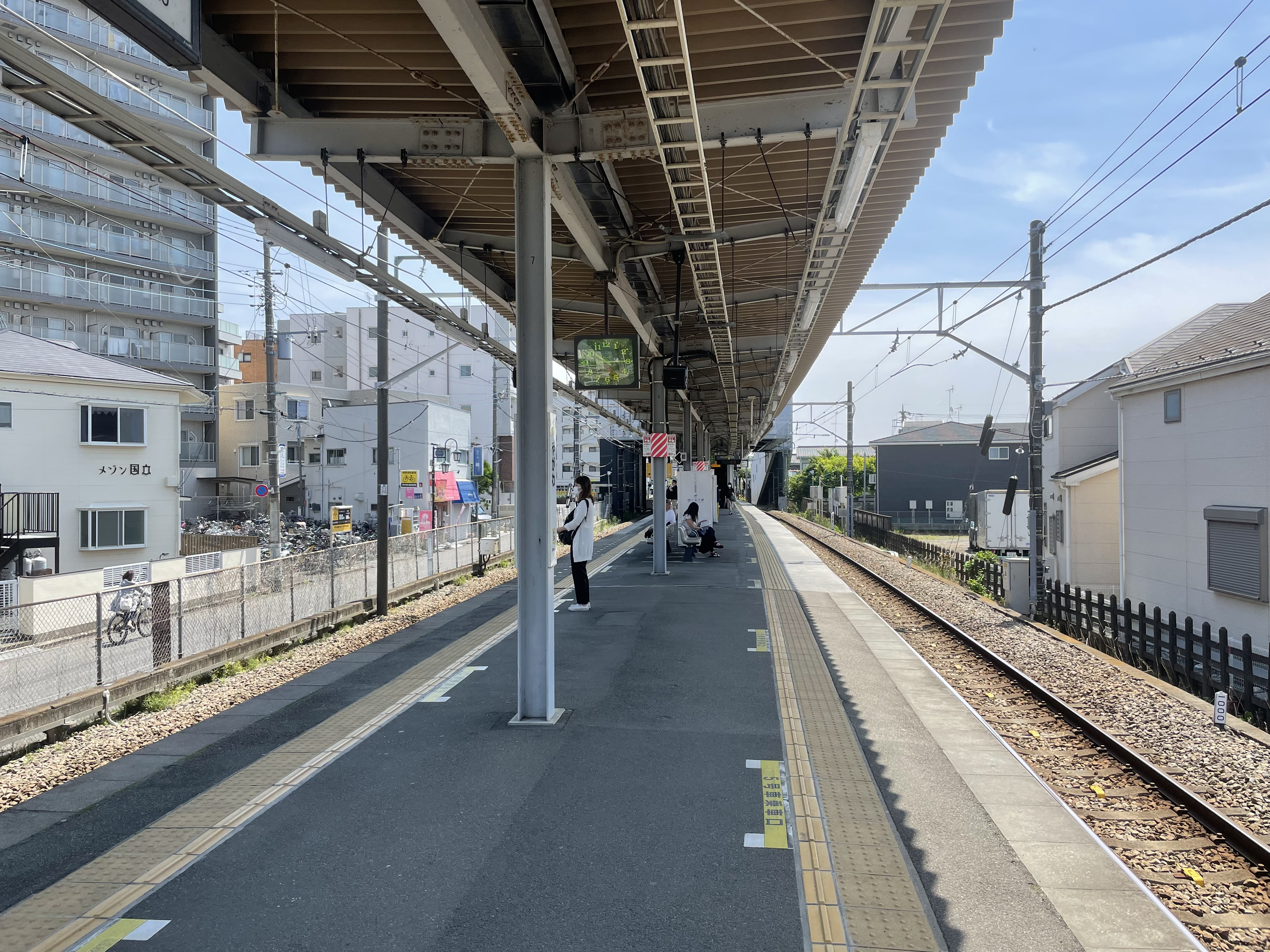
Platform, May 2022

=== Platforms ===
1	Nambu Line	for Nishi-Kunitachi and Tachikawa
2	Nambu Line	for Fuchū-Hommachi and Kawasaki

== History ==
The station opened on 20 May 1932. With the privatization of JNR on 1 April 1987, the station came under the control of JR East.

== Passenger statistics ==
In fiscal 2019, the station was used by an average of 8,541 passengers daily (boarding passengers only).

== See also ==
- List of railway stations in Japan

== Surrounding area ==
- Postal College
- Tama River
- National Route 20
