= Ishinomaki City Museum =

Museum in Ishinomaki, Miyagi, Japan

- 石巻市博物館
- Interactive map of the Ishinomaki City Museum area

General information
- Location: 1-8 Kaisei, Ishinomaki, Miyagi Prefecture, Japan
- Coordinates: 38°27′32″N 141°18′21″E
- Opened: 3 November 2021

Website
- Official website (in Japanese)

Ishinomaki City Museum (石巻市博物館, Ishinomaki-shi Hakubutsukan) opened in Maruhon MakiArt Terrace in Ishinomaki, Miyagi Prefecture, Japan in 2021, superseding and replacing the former Ishinomaki Cultural Centre, demolished in 2013 after being damaged in the 2011 Tōhoku earthquake and tsunami. The collection and displays relate to the archaeology, history, and culture of the area, and include a Jōmon ganban (stone tablet) that has been designated an Important Cultural Property.

== See also ==
- Tōhoku History Museum
- San Juan Bautista (ship)
- Numazu Shell Mound
- Saitō Garden
