= Kōbōyama Kofun =

Kofun period burial mount in Matsumoto, Japan

- 弘法山古墳 (Japanese)
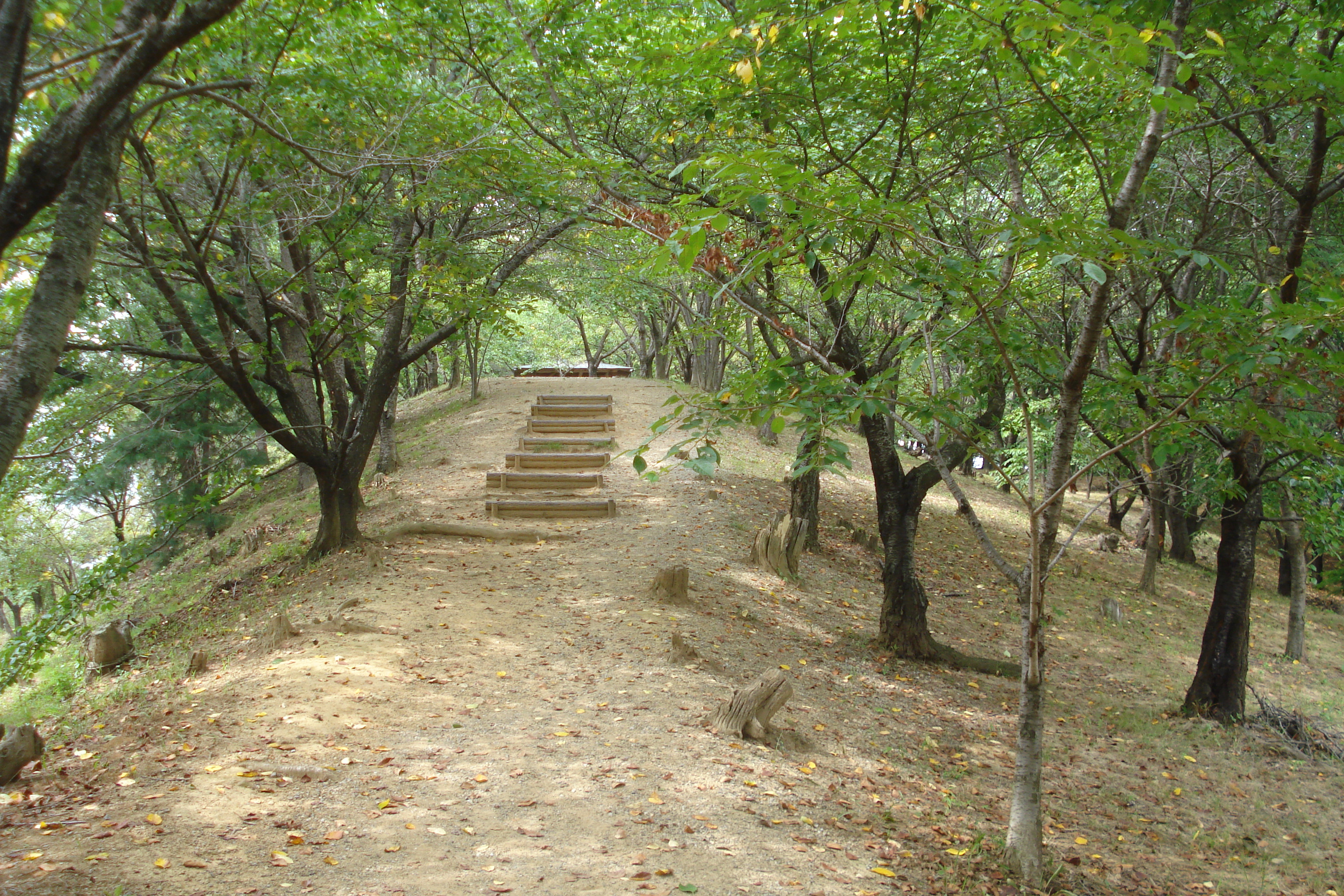
- Kōbōyama Kofun

- Kōbōyama Kofun Kōbōyama Kofun (Japan)
- 36°12′48″N 137°58′58″E
- Type: kofun
- Periods: Kofun period
- Location: Matsumoto, Nagano, Japan
- Region: Chūbu region

History
- Built: mid 3rd to early 4th century AD

Site notes
- Public access: yes

The Kōbōyama Kofun (弘法山古墳) is a large kofun burial mound located in the Nakayama neighborhood of the city of Matsumoto, Nagano in the Chūbu region of Japan. The site was designated a National Historic Site of Japan in 1976.

== Overview ==
The Kōbōyama Kofun is located at an elevation of 650 meters on the northern end of a hill named "Kōbōyama", to the south of the urban center of Matsumoto city. It is a "two conjoined rectangles" type tumulus (zenpō-kōhō-fun (前方後方墳)) and is aligned northwest along the ridgeline of the hill. The tumulus has a total length of 66 meters, with a posterior portion 33 meters square by six meters high, and an anterior front portion 22 meters square by two meters high. The presence of some fukiishi has been discovered, but there is no trace of any haniwa or a moat. The tomb is estimated to date from the middle of the 3rd century to the middle of the 4th century AD.

It was long known that there was an ancient tumulus at this location, and during World War II, an anti-aircraft battery was installed on its summit. However, it attracted little scholarly attention after the war, and it was assumed to be of little importance. When the Matsusho Gakuen school acquired the property in 1974 and started the construction of a new school building, the true shape and size of the tumulus was first realized, and its dating to the 3rd century, or early Kofun period, made it one of the oldest keyhole-shaped tombs in eastern Japan.

The tomb was excavated in 1974, during which a gravel pit burial chamber. The burial chamber was orthogonal to the main axis of the mound. Its internal dimensions were 5.5 meters long by 1.3 meters wide and 0.9 meters high. It was unusual in that its inner walls and floor were made of stacked river stones instead of cut-and-dressed stone. In the center was the remnants of a box-shaped wooden sarcophagus. Grave goods included a Chinese-made bronze mirror, three iron swords, a copper sheet, 738 small glass balls, magatama, an iron cauldron, 24 iron spearheads, and a large jug with an S-shaped mouth and many pottery shards. Many of these artifacts are now on display at Matsumoto City Museum of Archaeology.

The identity of the inhabitant of the tomb is unknown, but its style is similar to tombs found in the late Yayoi period in either western Japan, or the Nōbi Plain area of Tōkai region of Japan, both areas of which mentioned as one of the kingdoms of the Wa in the Chinese Records of the Three Kingdoms as rivals to the power of the Kingdom of Yamatai. It is also theorized that this is the tomb of one of the Suwa Kuni no miyatsuko, local kings of the region who are the ancestors of the Suwa clan.

The view from the tumulus extends to the Hida Mountains in the distance, and around the base of the hill on which the tumulus was constructed, the remains of 70 hectares of Kofun-period paddy fields to the north and 40 hectares to the east have been found. The kofun and its surroundings now have been planted with over 2000 Yoshino sakura trees, and are a popular flower-viewing spot within Matsumoto city. It is approximately 15 minutes on foot from Matsumoto Station.

== Gallery ==
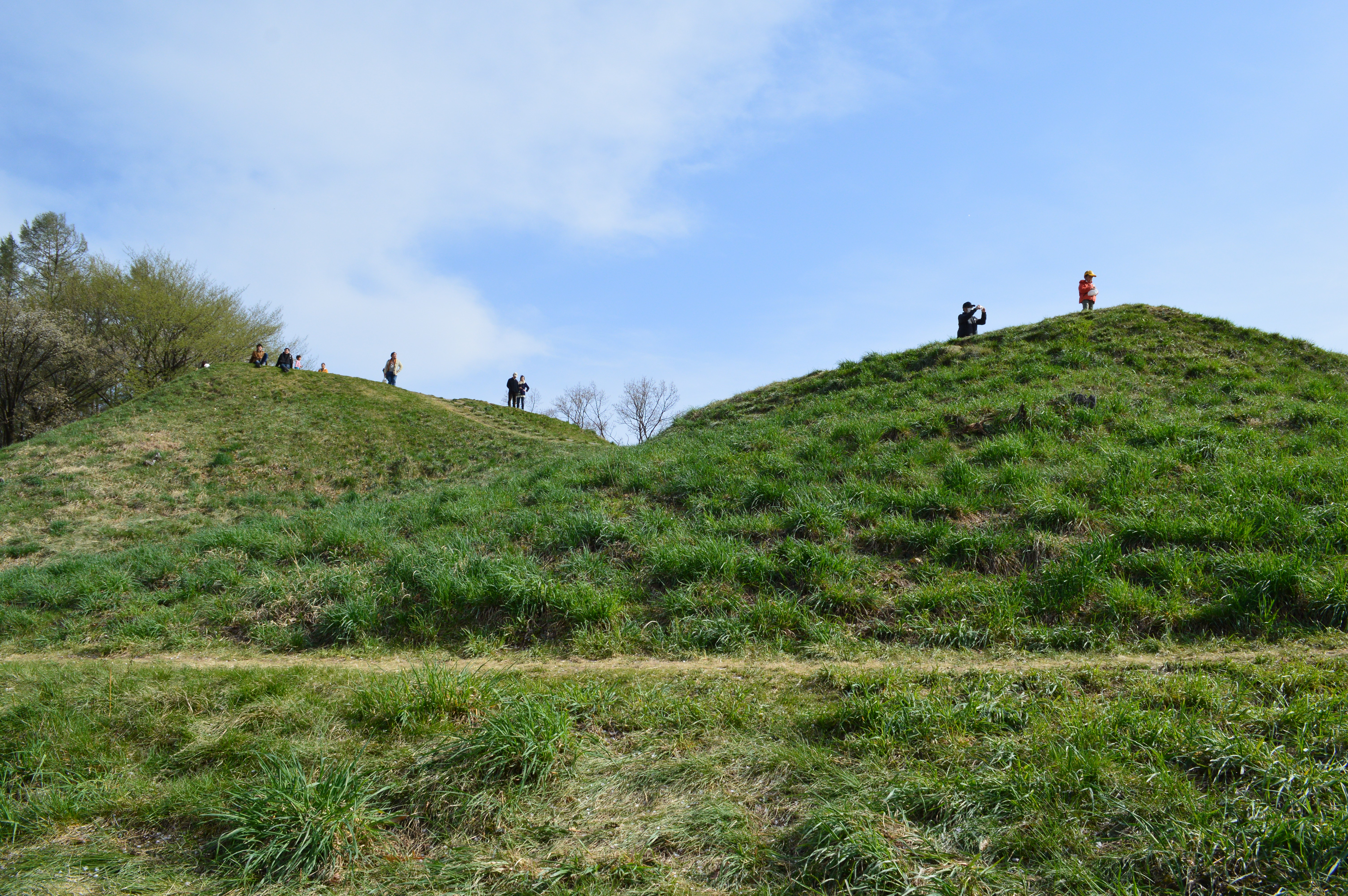
Overview

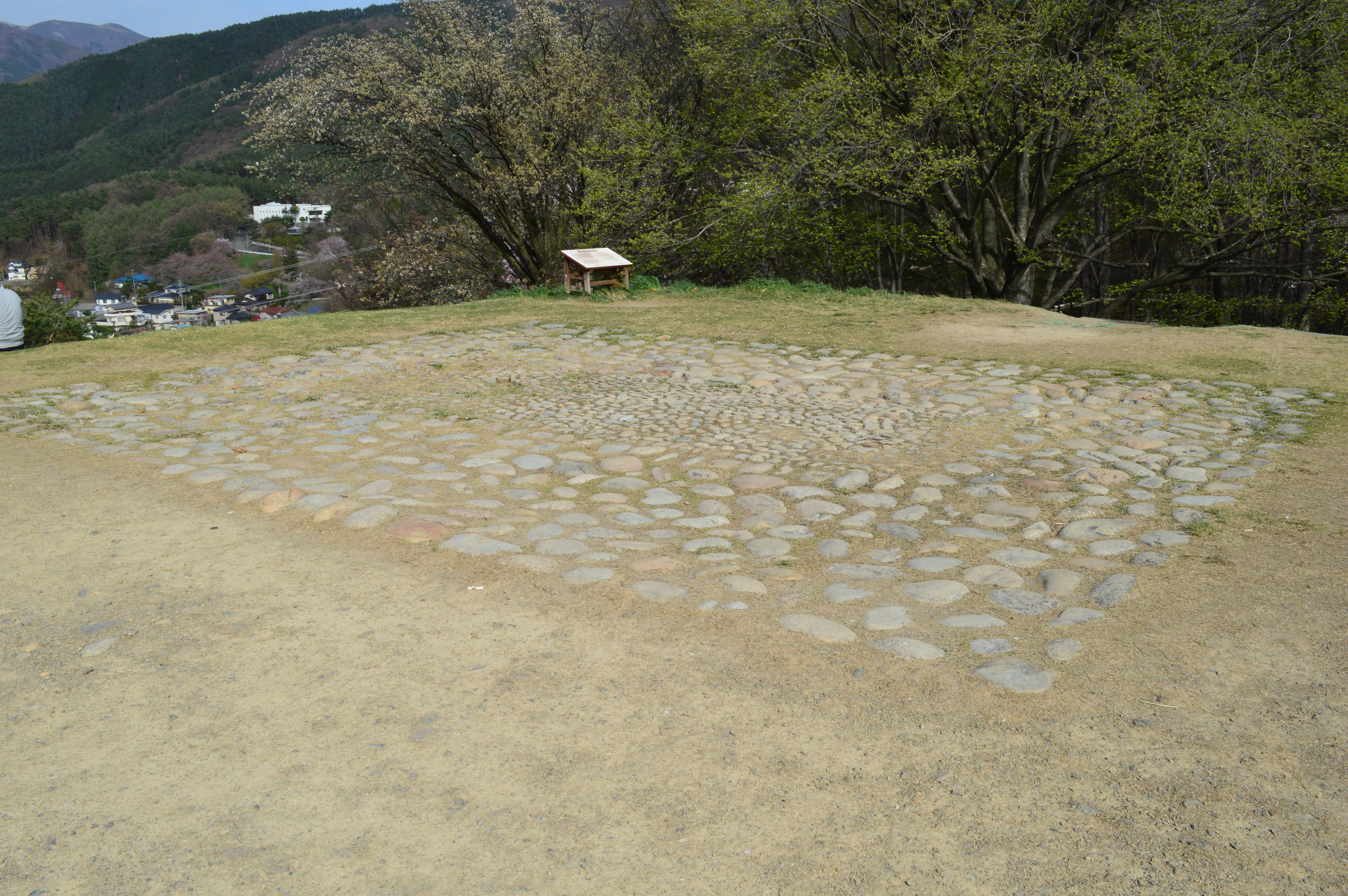
Location of the burial chamber

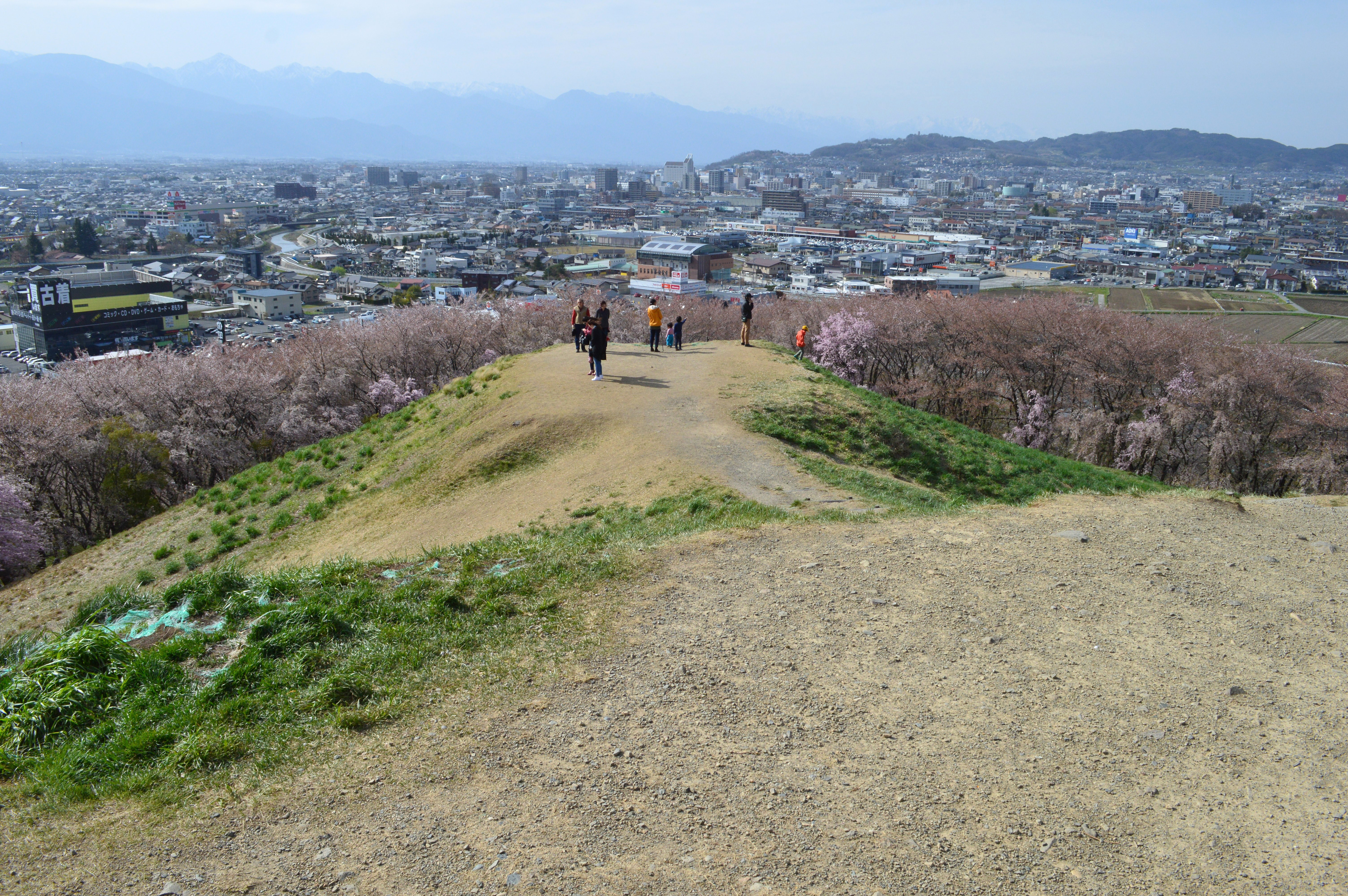
Panoramic view

== See also ==
- List of Historic Sites of Japan (Nagano)
