= Ganban =

Type of Japanese archaeological artefact

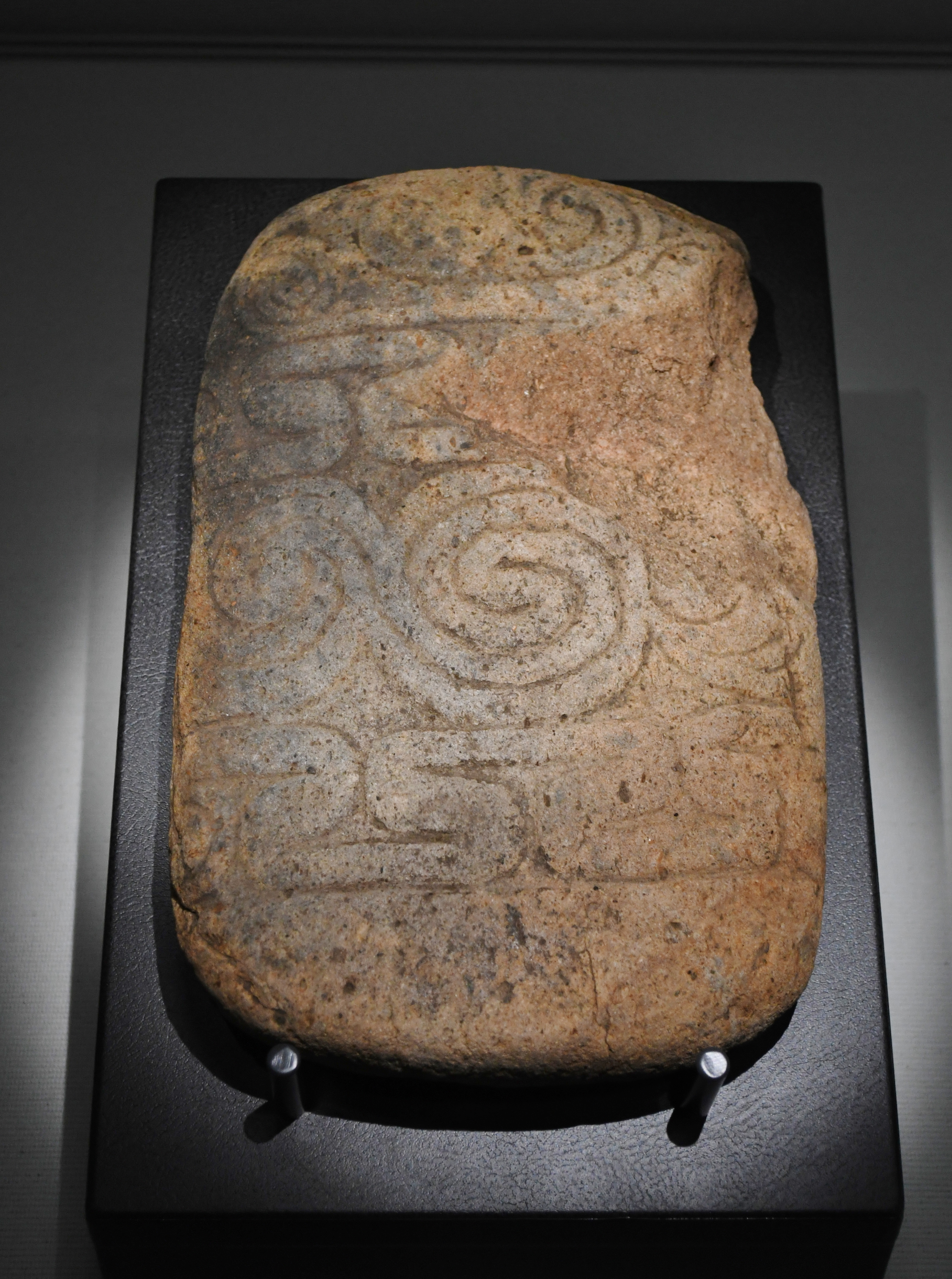
Late to Final Jōmon ganban (ICP) from Kitayoneoka Site, Gunma Prefecture (Gunma Prefectural Museum of History)

Ganban (岩版), sometimes translated as "stone tablets", are a type of archaeological artefact known from Jōmon Japan. They are the counterparts in stone to the clay doban.

== Overview ==
Ganban were first named as such, by analogy with the ceramic doban, in 1896, after Satō Denzō discovered an example at Kamegaoka Site (initially it was labelled 岩盤). Ganban take the form of a rectangular or oval tablet that, like gangū stone figurines, are typically carved from stone that is relatively soft and easy to work, such as tuff, mudstone, and sandstone. They are mostly known from Tōhoku, with few examples found west of the Kantō region. Like the clay doban, some ganban have representations of the human body. They are thought to have served some role in the rituals and beliefs of the time.

== Important Cultural Properties ==
Three ganban have been designated Important Cultural Properties:

- Ganban from Kitayoneoka Site, Gunma Prefecture (Gunma Prefectural Museum of History)
- Ganban from Tome, Miyagi Prefecture (Ishinomaki City Museum)
- Ganban from Kosaka, Akita Prefecture (Keio University)

== See also ==
- List of National Treasures of Japan (archaeological materials)
- Jōmon period sites
- Gangū
- Ganban'yoku
