= Japan Ukiyo-e Museum =

Art museum in Nagano Prefecture, Japan

Coordinates: 36.2317515°N 137.9344437°E

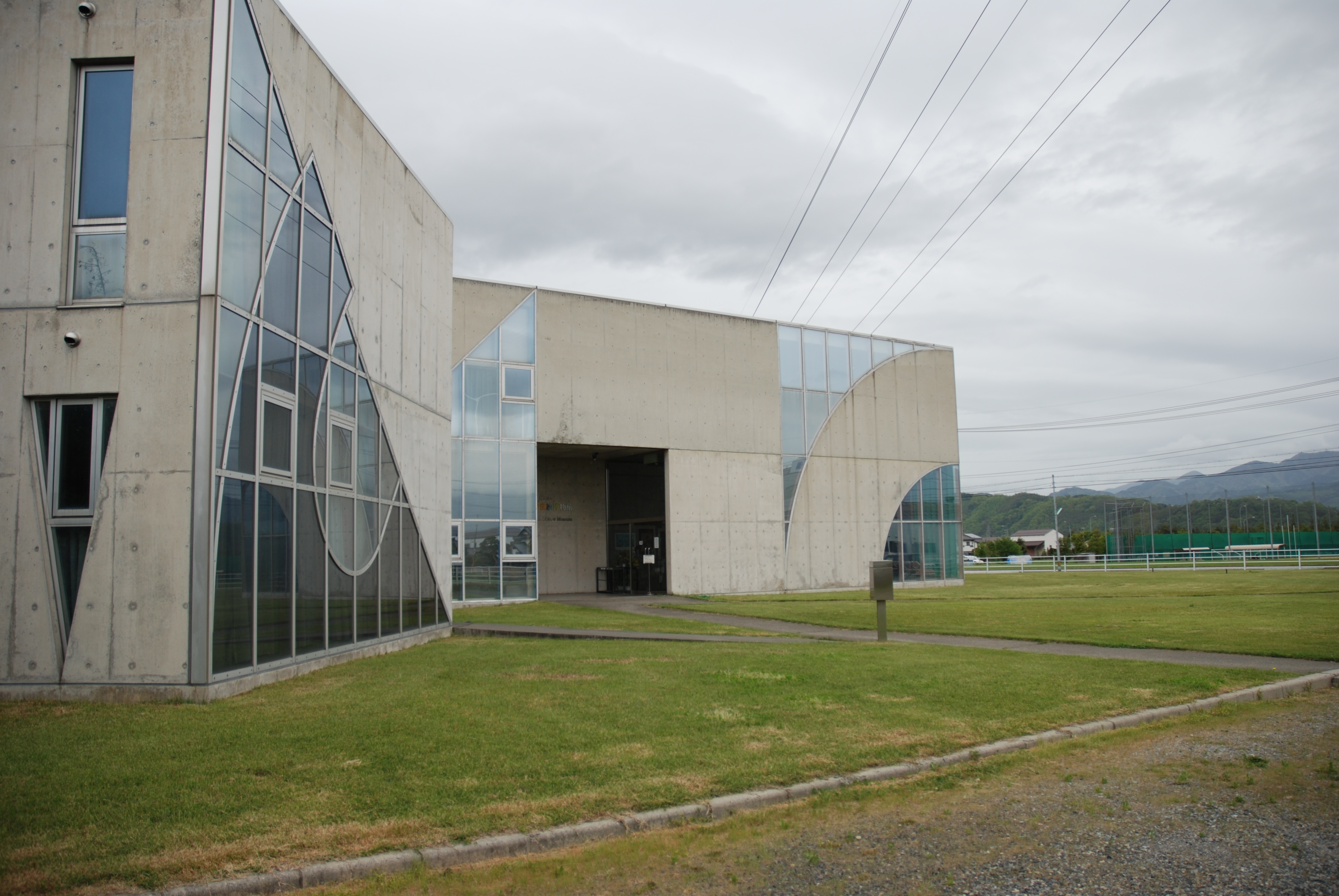
The Japan Ukiyo-e Museum Photo: Bengt Oberger

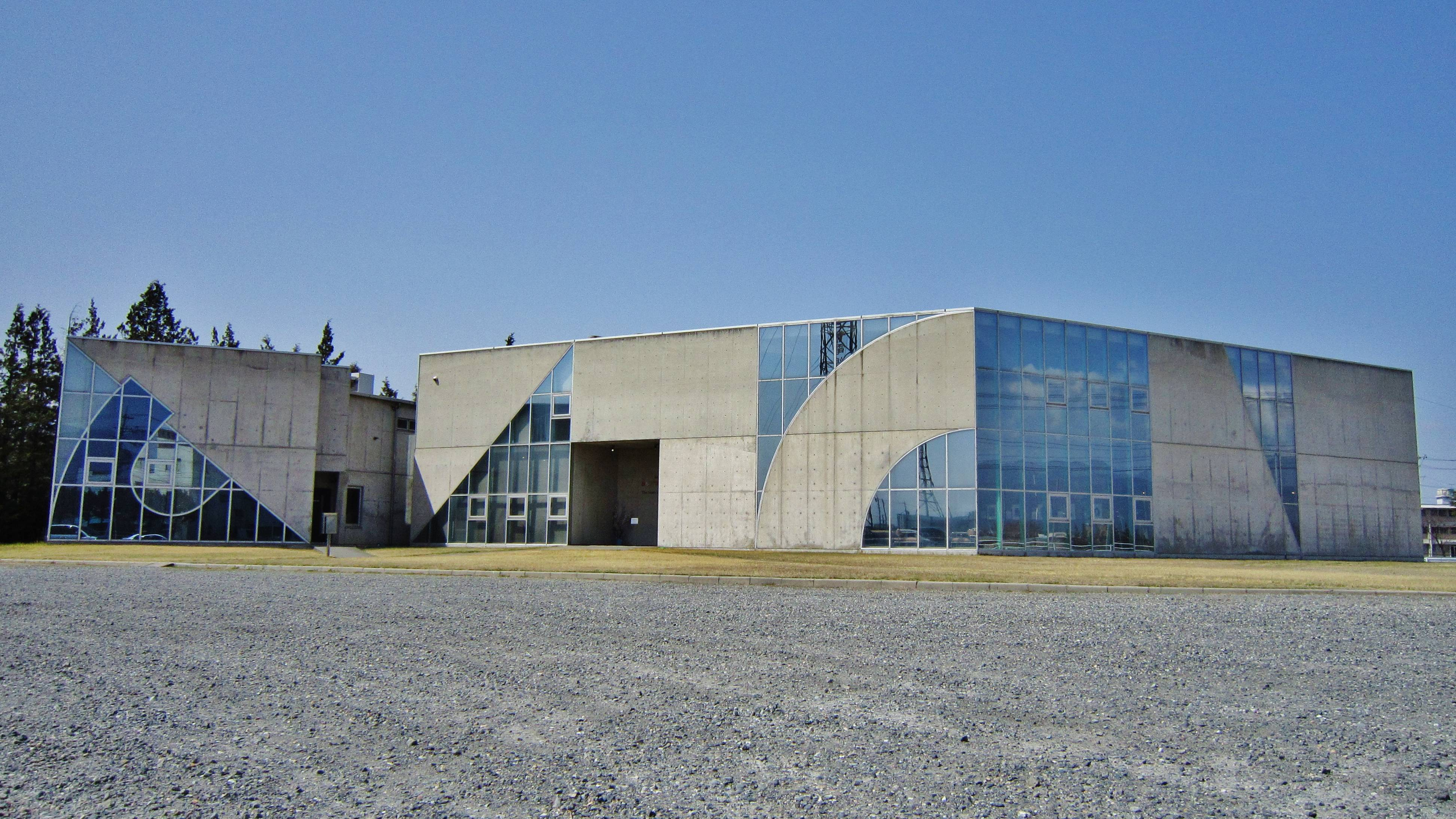
The Japan Ukiyo-e Museum

The Japan Ukiyo-e Museum (日本浮世絵博物館, Nihon Ukiyo-e Hakubutsukan)(JUM) is a privately owned Japanese art museum in Matsumoto, Nagano Prefecture. It holds over 100,000 Japanese woodblock prints, regarded as the world's largest collection of this form of art.

The Japan Ukiyo-e Museum was established in 1982 by Tokichi Sakai, a member of the Sakai merchant family, who have practiced business in Matsumoto for generations. It is based on collections of ukiyo-e owned by the family. The first items were collected by Yoshitaka Sakai (1810–69), paper wholesaler and art patron, and his son and grandson. Over the years, the collection has grown to include not only historical prints, but also many contemporary prints by Japanese artists. Items from this collection have been exhibited in Europe, North America, the Middle East, South America, and elsewhere in East Asia.

The museum features curated exhibits, a movie detailing the history of Ukiyo-e, and a gift shop. The museum's main building was designed by the architect Shinohara Kazuo (1925–2006) and extended in 1995 by the architect Haba Kuniharu. It is located next to the Matsumoto Open Air Architectural Museum.
