= Gangū =

Type of Japanese archaeological artefact

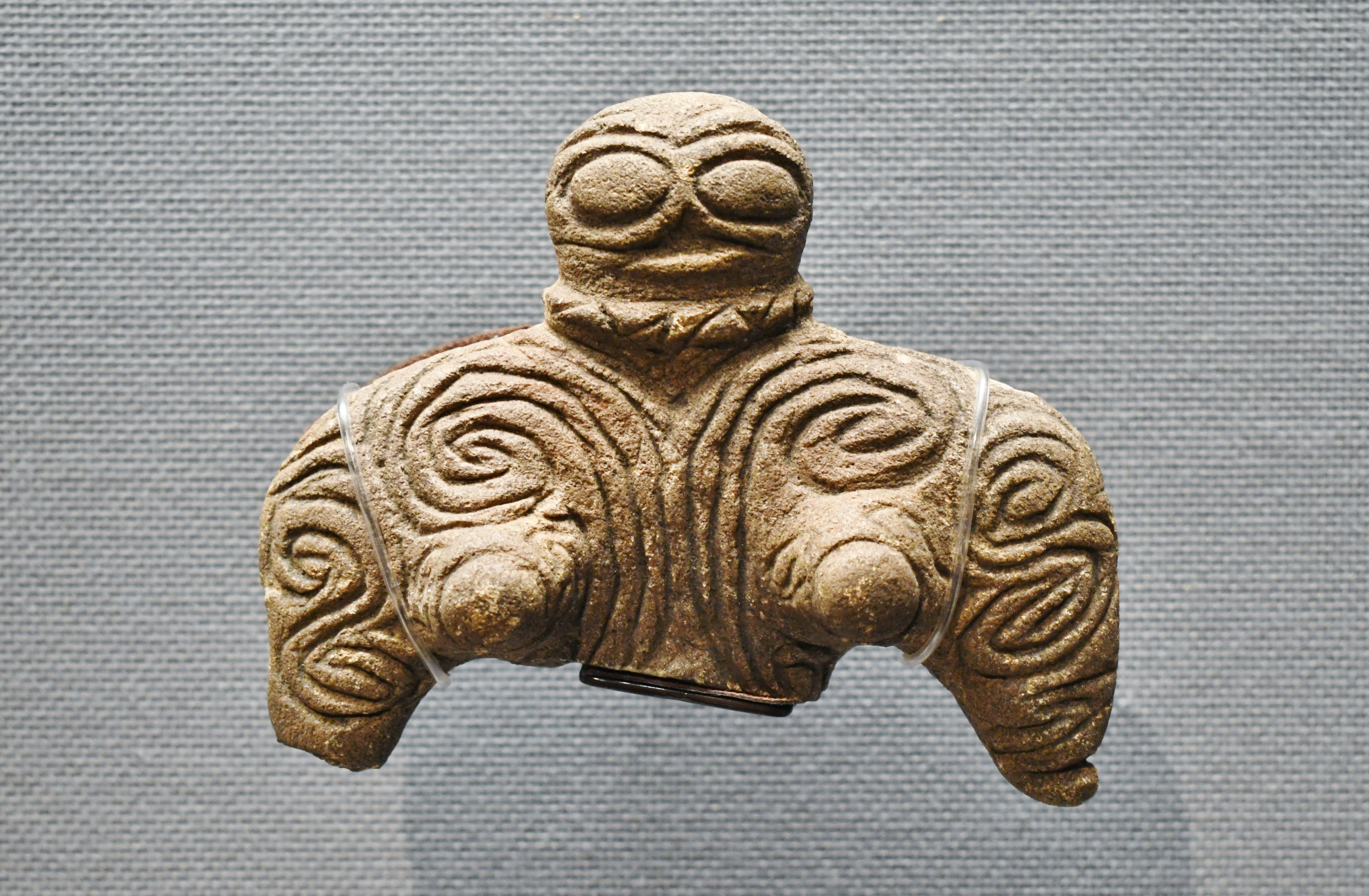
Final Jōmon gangū excavated in Nanbu, Aomori Prefecture (Tokyo National Museum)

Gangū (岩偶), sometimes translated as "stone figurines" or "stone figures", are the counterparts in stone to the clay dogū of Jōmon Japan.

== Overview ==
The earliest-known stone figures from Japan include a "kokeshi-shape" figurine from the palaeolithic Iwato Site in Ōita Prefecture and a number of Incipient Jōmon line-incised stones from Kamikuroiwa Iwakage Site in Ehime Prefecture. Known in far fewer numbers than dogū, gangū have been found from contexts dating throughout the Jōmon period, with earlier examples being typically simpler in form. They are generally made from stone that is relatively easy to work, including pumice, tuff, mudstone, and sandstone. As with the clay dogū, many of those excavated were already broken in Jōmon times, likely indicative of some aspect of their ritual function. More voluptuous examples with prominent breasts may represent a fertility goddess and/or relate to motherhood.

== Important Cultural Properties ==
One gangū has been designated an Important Cultural Property:

- Early Jōmon gangū (15.0 centimetres (5.9 in)) from Uchitai Site in Kosaka, Akita Prefecture (Keio University)

== Other gangū ==
- Final Jōmon gangū (16.0 centimetres (6.3 in)) from Horowata, Iwaizumi, Iwate Prefecture (Japanese Folk Crafts Museum)
- Final Jōmon gangū (11.7 centimetres (4.6 in)) from Kannonbayashi Site in Goshogawara, Aomori Prefecture (Tachineputa Museum)
- Final Jōmon Kamegaoka culture gangū (9.8 centimetres (3.9 in)) from Towada, Aomori Prefecture (Kyushu National Museum)

== See also ==
- Jōmon period sites
- Ganban
- Sekijin sekiba
