= Kunitachi =

Kunitachi 国立市
- City
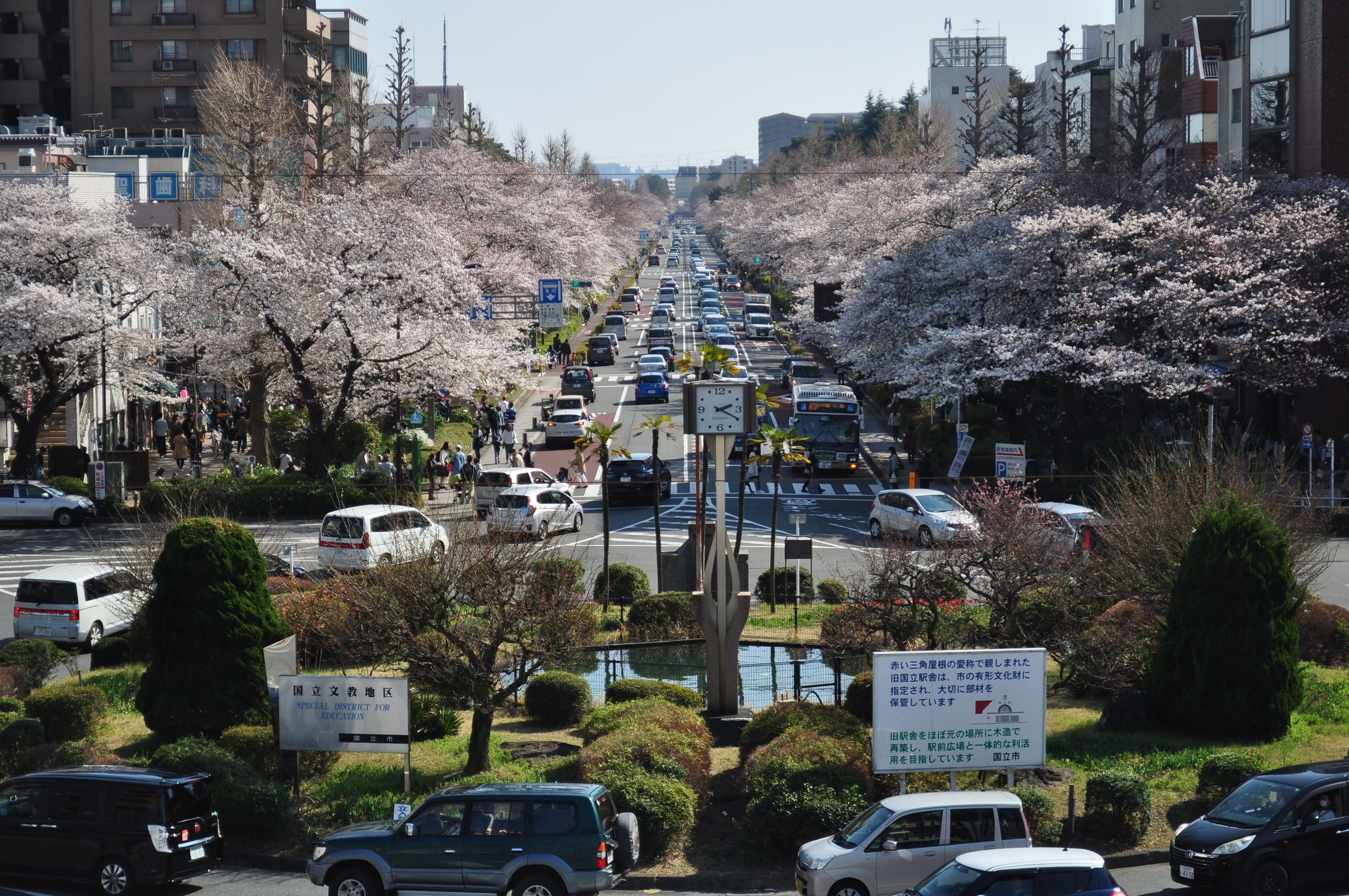
- Daigakudori Street

- Flag Seal

- Location of Kunitachi in Tokyo

- Coordinates: 35°41′2.1″N 139°26′29″E
- Country: Japan
- Region: Kantō
- Prefecture: Tokyo

Government
  - Mayor: Shinya Hamasaki (since December 2024)

Area
  - Total: 8.15 km^{2} (3.15 sq mi)

Population (April 2021)
  - Total: 76,423
  - Density: 9,380/km^{2} (24,300/sq mi)
- Time zone: UTC+9 (Japan Standard Time)
- Symbols
  - Tree: Ginkgo biloba
  - Flower: Prunus mume
  - Bird: Great tit
- Phone number: 042-576-2111
- Address: 2-47-1 Fujimi-dai, Kunitachi-shi, Tokyo 186-0501
- Website: Official website

Kunitachi (国立市, Kunitachi-shi) is a city located in the western portion of the Tokyo Metropolis, Japan. As of 1 April 2021, the city had an estimated population of 76,423 in 38,825 households, and a population density of 9,400 persons per km^{2}. Approximately 41.9% of the city population is over 65 years in age. The total area of the city is 8.15 square kilometres (3.15 sq mi).

== Geography ==
Kunitachi is located in the Musashino Terrace of central Tokyo Metropolis. Kunitachi is known for its broad main avenue, Daigaku Dori (University Avenue). This cherry-tree-lined boulevard stretches from Kunitachi Station on the Chūō Main Line toward the banks of the Tama River.

=== Surrounding municipalities ===
Tokyo Metropolis

- Fuchū
- Hino
- Kokubunji
- Tachikawa

=== Climate ===
Kunitachi has a humid subtropical climate (Köppen Cfa) characterized by warm summers and cool winters with light to no snowfall. The average annual temperature in Kunitachi is 13.9 °C. The average annual rainfall is 1647 mm with September as the wettest month. The temperatures are highest on average in August, at around 25.4 °C, and lowest in January, at around 2.5 °C.

== Demographics ==
Per Japanese census data, the population of Kunitachi expanded rapidly in the postwar decades and has continued to grow at a slower rate since then.

Historical population
Year	Pop.	±%
1920	2,611	—
1930	3,814	+46.1%
1940	10,052	+163.6%
1950	14,679	+46.0%
1960	32,609	+122.1%
1970	59,709	+83.1%
1980	64,144	+7.4%
1990	65,833	+2.6%
2000	72,187	+9.7%
2010	75,510	+4.6%
2020	77,130	+2.1%

== History ==
Kunitachi lies along the historical Kōshū Kaidō, a route that connected Edo with Kofu in the province of Kai (present-day Yamanashi Prefecture). The area was noted for its abundant spring water. The villages of Ishida, Aoyagi and Yabo were created within Tama District of Kanagawa Prefecture during the establishment of the modern municipalities system on April 1, 1889. The district was transferred from Kanagawa to Tokyo in 1893. In the 1920, much of the land was obtained by Kojiro Tsutsumi, the founder of Seibu, who began large-scale development of a planned community, which he intended to become a university town modeled after Göttingen in Germany. The Tokyo University of Commerce (Hitotsubashi University) was relocated from central Tokyo to this location, and a train station was opened on Chūō Main Line in 1926. The station was named "Kunitachi", taking one kanji from the names of the stations to either side, namely Kokubunji Station and Tachikawa Station. The three villages were merged to form Kunitachi town in 1951. Kunitachi was elevated to city status on January 1, 1967.

== Government ==
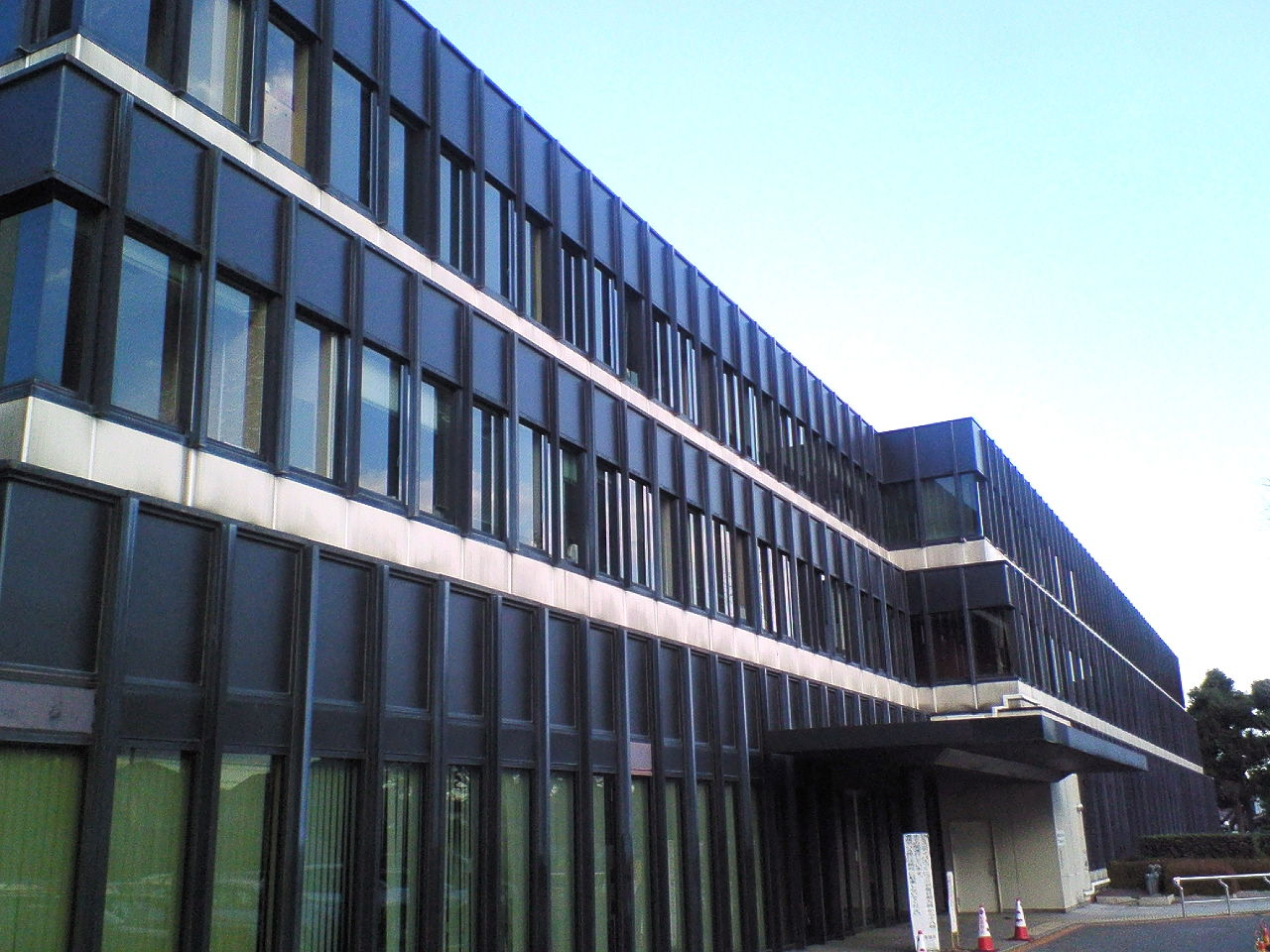
Kunitachi City Hall

Kunitachi has a mayor-council form of government with a directly elected mayor and a unicameral city council of 22 members. Kunitachi, together with Kokubunji, contributes two members to the Tokyo Metropolitan Assembly. In terms of national politics, the city is part of Tokyo 21st district of the lower house of the Diet of Japan.

== Economy ==
Kunitachi remains a university town, but is also increasing a commuter town for central Tokyo, with an estimated 25.1% of the population commuting to central Tokyo daily, per the 2015 census.

== Education ==
Tertiary:

- Hitotsubashi University

The city was originally home to the Kunitachi College of Music. The tertiary-level branch of the conservatory is now located far outside the city, but its attached high school and business affiliate, Kunitachi Gakki (Western Tokyo's largest community music center), remain in central Kunitachi.

The city has two public high schools operated by the Tokyo Metropolitan Government Board of Education.

- Kunitachi High School
- Fifth Commercial High School

Kunitachi has eight public elementary schools and three junior high schools operated by the city government.

Municipal junior high schools:

- Kunitachi No. 1 (国立第一中学校)
- Kunitachi No. 2 (国立第二中学校)
- Kunitachi No. 3 (国立第三中学校)

Municipal elementary schools:

- Kunitachi No. 1 (国立第一小学校)
- Kunitachi No. 2 (国立第二小学校)
- Kunitachi No. 3 (国立第三小学校)
- Kunitachi No. 4 (国立第四小学校)
- Kunitachi No. 5 (国立第五小学校)
- Kunitachi No. 6 (国立第六小学校)
- Kunitachi No. 7 (国立第七小学校)
- Kunitachi No. 8 (国立第八小学校)

There are also three private high schools. There are also three private elementary schools and one private junior high school.

- Kunitachi College of Music Junior & High School
- NHK Gakuen

== Transportation ==
=== Railway ===
JR East – Chūō Main Line

- Kunitachi

JR East – Nambu Line

- Yaho - Yagawa

=== Highway ===
- Chūō Expressway
- National Route 20

== Local attractions ==
- Yabo Tenman-gū, a Shinto shrine established in 903 AD
