= Nishi-Kunitachi Station =

Railway station in Tachikawa, Tokyo, Japan

JN25 Nishi-Kunitachi Station 西国立駅
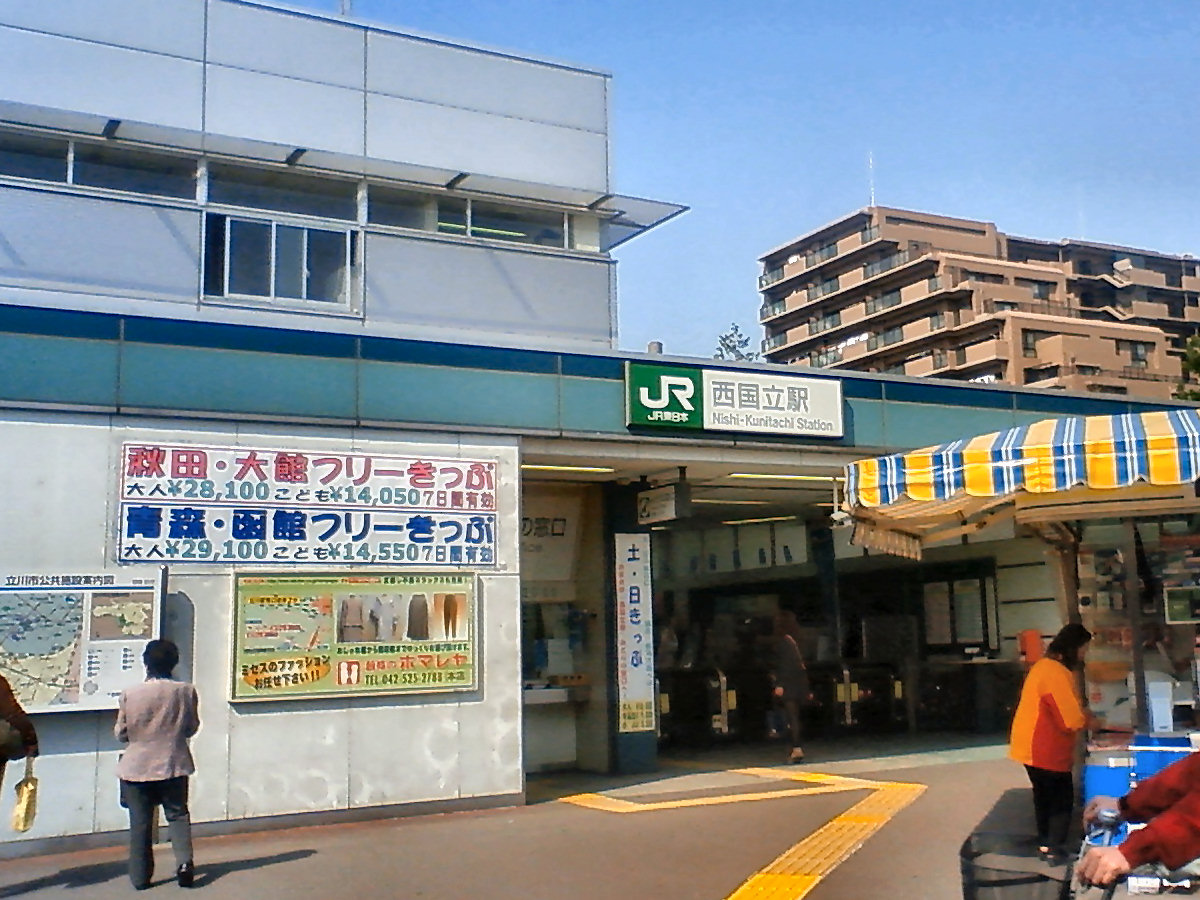
- Nishi-Kunitachi Station in March 2008

General information
- Location: 1-25-23 Hagoromo, Tachikawa-shi, Tokyo-to 190-0022; Japan
- Coordinates: 35.6939°N 139.4242°E
- Operator: JR East
- Line: Nambu Line
- Distance: 34.3 km from Kawasaki
- Platforms: 2 side platforms
- Connections: Bus stop

Other information
- Status: Staffed
- Website: Official website

History
- Opened: 11 December 1929

Passengers
- FY2019: 10,108

Services
Preceding station	JR East	Following station
Tachikawa JN26 Terminus	Nambu Line Local	Yagawa JN24 towards Kawasaki
Location
- Location within Tokyo Location within Japan

Nishi-Kunitachi Station (西国立駅, Nishi-Kunitachi-eki) is a passenger railway station located in the city of Tachikawa, Tokyo, Japan, operated by East Japan Railway Company (JR East).

== Lines ==
Nishi-Kunitachi Station is served by the Nambu Line, and is situated 34.3 km from the terminus of the line at Kawasaki Station.

== Station layout ==
The station consists of two elevated opposed side platforms, with an elevated station building above the tracks and platforms. The station is staffed.

=== Platforms ===
1	Nambu Line	for Fuchūhommachi and Kawasaki
2	Nambu Line	for Tachikawa

== History ==
The station opened on 11 December 1929.

== Passenger statistics ==
In fiscal 2019, the station was used by an average of 10,108 passengers daily (boarding passengers only).

== Surrounding area ==
- Tachikawa City Civic Center
- Tachikawa Children's Future Center
- National Civil Service Mutual Aid Association Tachikawa Hospital
- Kenseikai Fureai Mutual Hospital
- Tokyo Tachikawa Joint Government Building
- Tokyo Tachikawa Tax Office

== See also ==
- List of railway stations in Japan
