= Umataka-Sanjūinaba Site =

Archaeological site in Nagaoka, Japan

- 馬高・三十稲場遺跡 (Japanese)
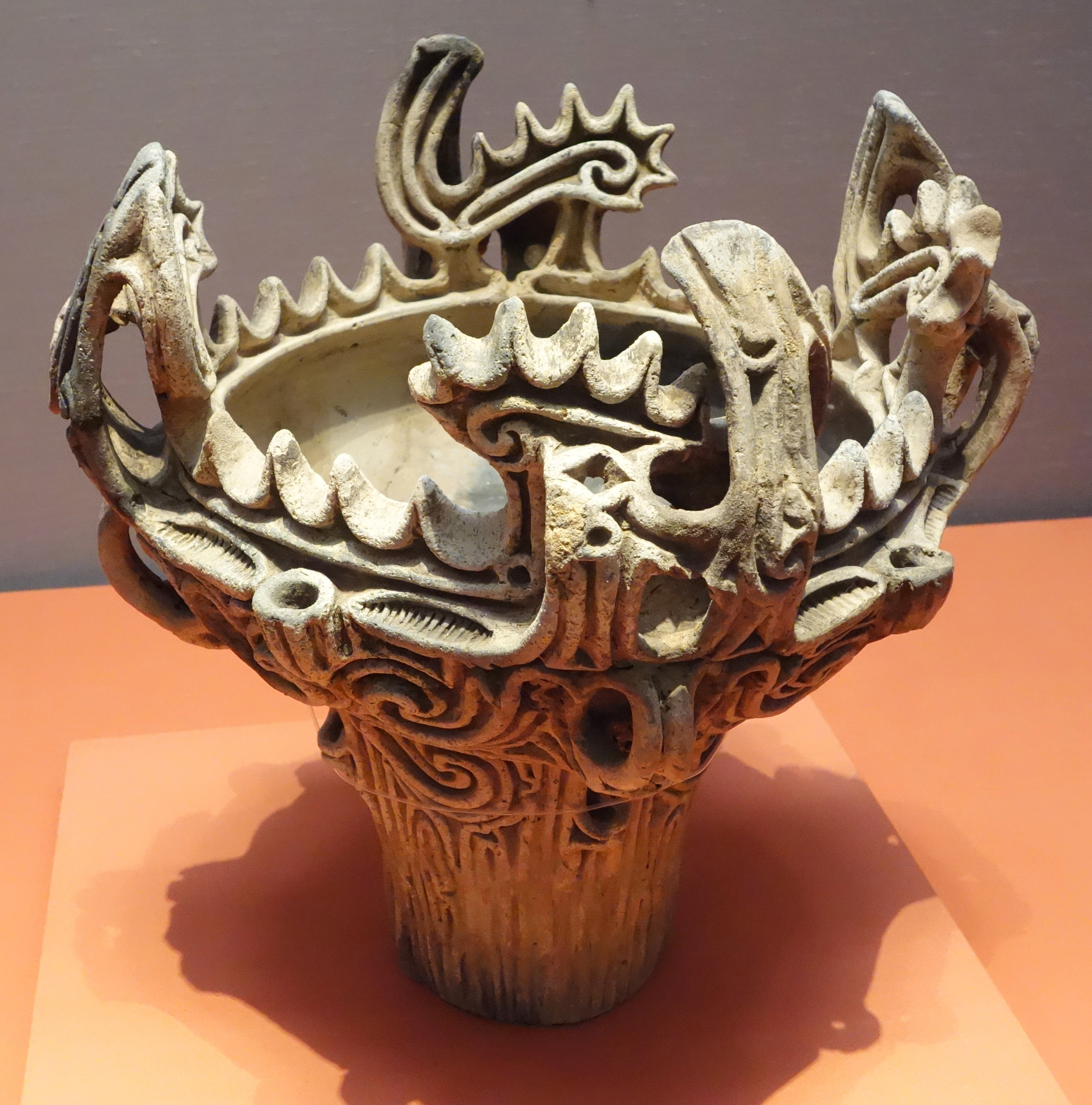
- flame-motif pottery from the Umataka-Sanjūinaba Site

- Umataka-Sanjūinaba Site Umataka-Sanjūinaba Site (Japan)
- 37°26′49″N 138°46′00″E
- Type: settlement
- Periods: Jōmon period
- Location: Nagaoka, Niigata, Japan
- Region: Hokuriku region

Site notes
- Public access: Yes (Park, Museum)

Umataka-Sanjūinaba Site (馬高・三十稲場遺跡, Umataka-Sanjūinaba iseki) is an archaeological site containing the remnants of a large middle Jōmon period settlement located in the Sekiharamachi neighborhood of the city of Nagaoka, Niigata in the Hokuriku region of Japan. It is noted as the type site for a type of Jōmon period pottery which uses a flame-like motif. The site was designated a National Historic Site of Japan in 1979.

== Overview ==
The site is located on a hill with an elevation of 60 to 70 meters on the east bank the Shinano River. It was partially excavated by local amateur archaeologists in the Meiji period. The site gained widespread academic attention in 1936, when large ritual clay figurines were found. The site was also discovered to be the origin of Jōmon "flame style" pottery, which has four large protrusions forming a "cockscomb" design on the rim, with ridge-shaped decorations. It was subsequently excavated in the 1950s by the Dutch archaeologist Gerard J. Groot, Waseda University and the Nagaoka City Board of Education, during which time the large extent of the settlement was realized. The settlement measured 150 meters east-to-west and 250 meters north-to-south. In addition to numerous examples of Jōmon pottery, artifacts discovered included stone tools, and jade jewelry and clay pulley-shaped earrings.

The Umataka portion of the site is the older section, dating from approximately 5500 to 4500 years ago. The Sanjūinaba portion of the site is located slightly to the north of the Umataka portion and is separated by a small stream and a marsh, and dates from the late Jōmon period (approximately 4500 – 3200 years ago), and the style of pottery found in this location often had lids, and an intricate pieced and woven decorative pattern. Earthenware with a lid is rare in Jōmon pottery, and the presence of carbonized rice at the bottom of some of these pots indicated that they were for actual use in cooking. The Sanjūinaba portion of the site also had a three-meter deep pit where clay was mined. Rock slabs engraved with intricate motifs and jade and talc-polished whetstones have also been excavated.

Many of the artifacts found at the site are displayed at the Umataka Jōmon Museum (長岡市馬高縄文館, Nagaoka City Umataka Jōmon-kan), which is located on site. One of the restored flame-motif pottery jars recovered from the site was designated a national Important Cultural Property of Japan in 1990, and the designation was expanded in 2002 to include a total of 126 items of pottery and 173 stone items under a collective designation. The surrounding area is preserved as a part with a number of reconstructions of pit dwellings.

The site and museum are located about eight kilometers west of Nagaoka Station on the JR East Joetsu Line, and there is a bus service from the station.

== Gallery ==
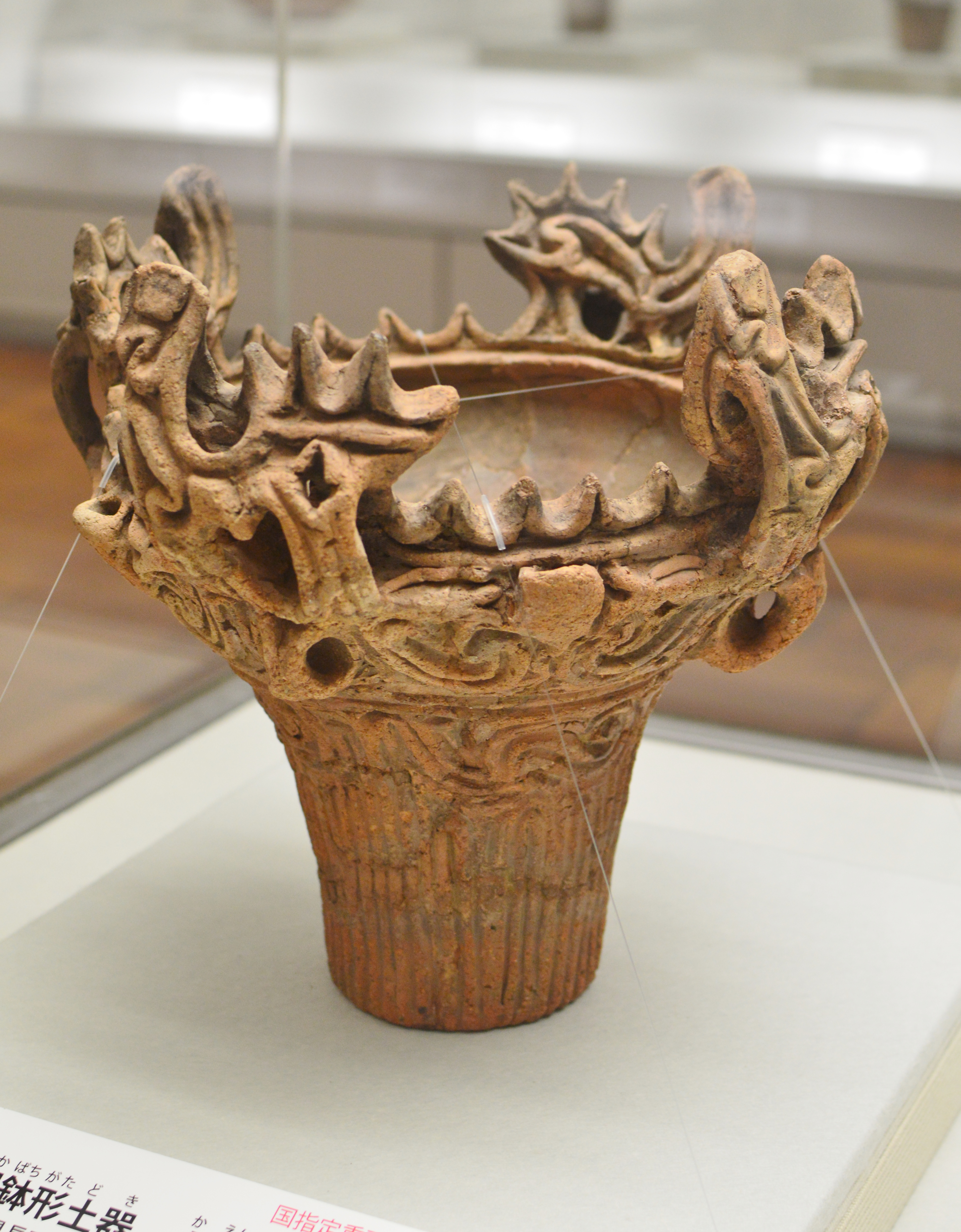
Deep flame-style pottery（ICP）
kept at Kyoto University Museum

Shallow flame-style pottery（ICP）
kept at Kyoto University Museum

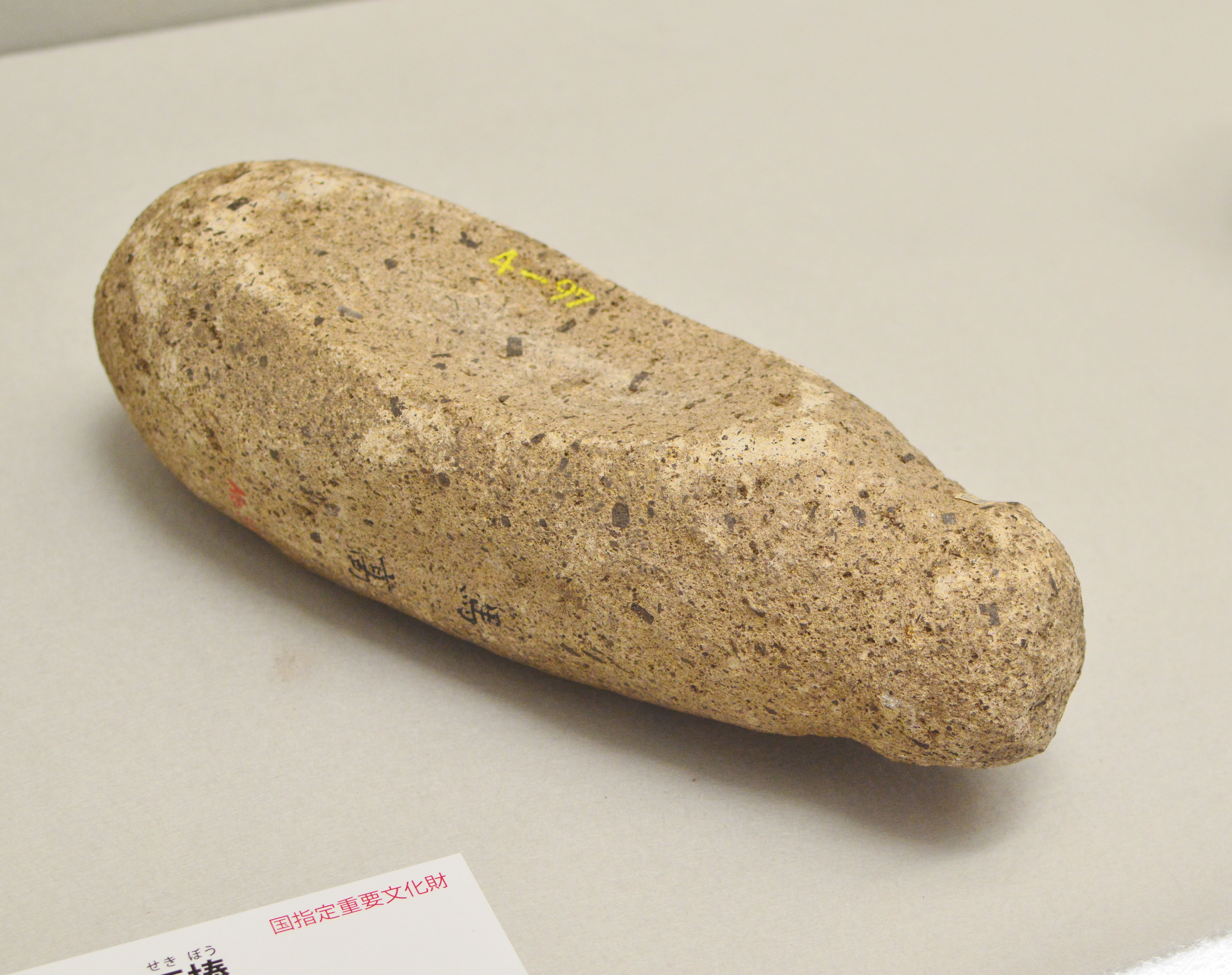
stone implement（ICP）
kept at Kyoto University Museum

Clay Figurine（ICP）
kept at Kyoto University Museum

Clay Tablet（ICP）
kept at Kyoto University Museum

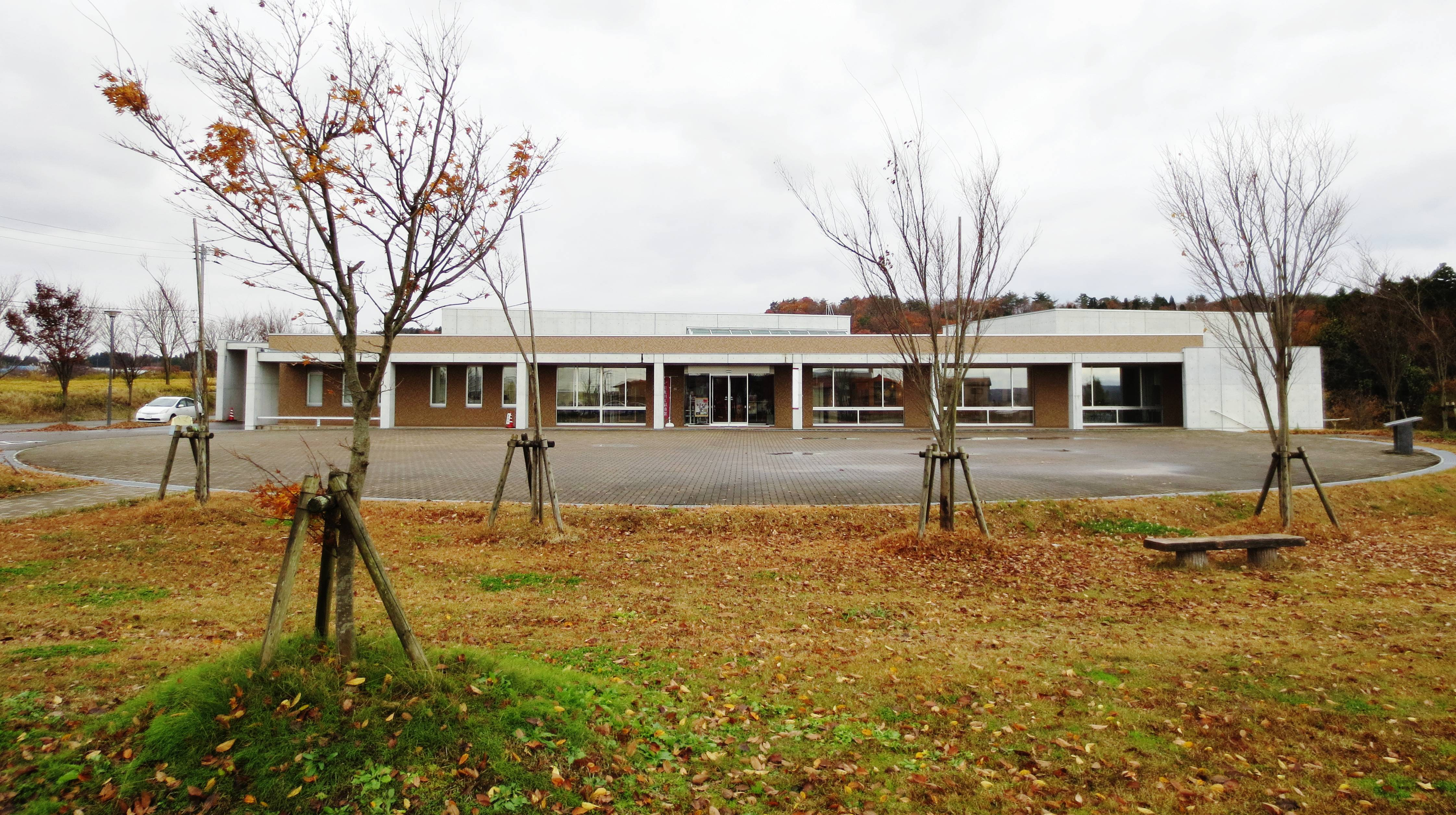
Umataka Jomon Museum

== See also ==
- List of Historic Sites of Japan (Niigata)
