= Kamegaoka Stone Age Site =

Archaeological site in Tsugaru, Aomori, Japan

Kamegaoka Site
- 亀ヶ岡遺跡 (Japanese)
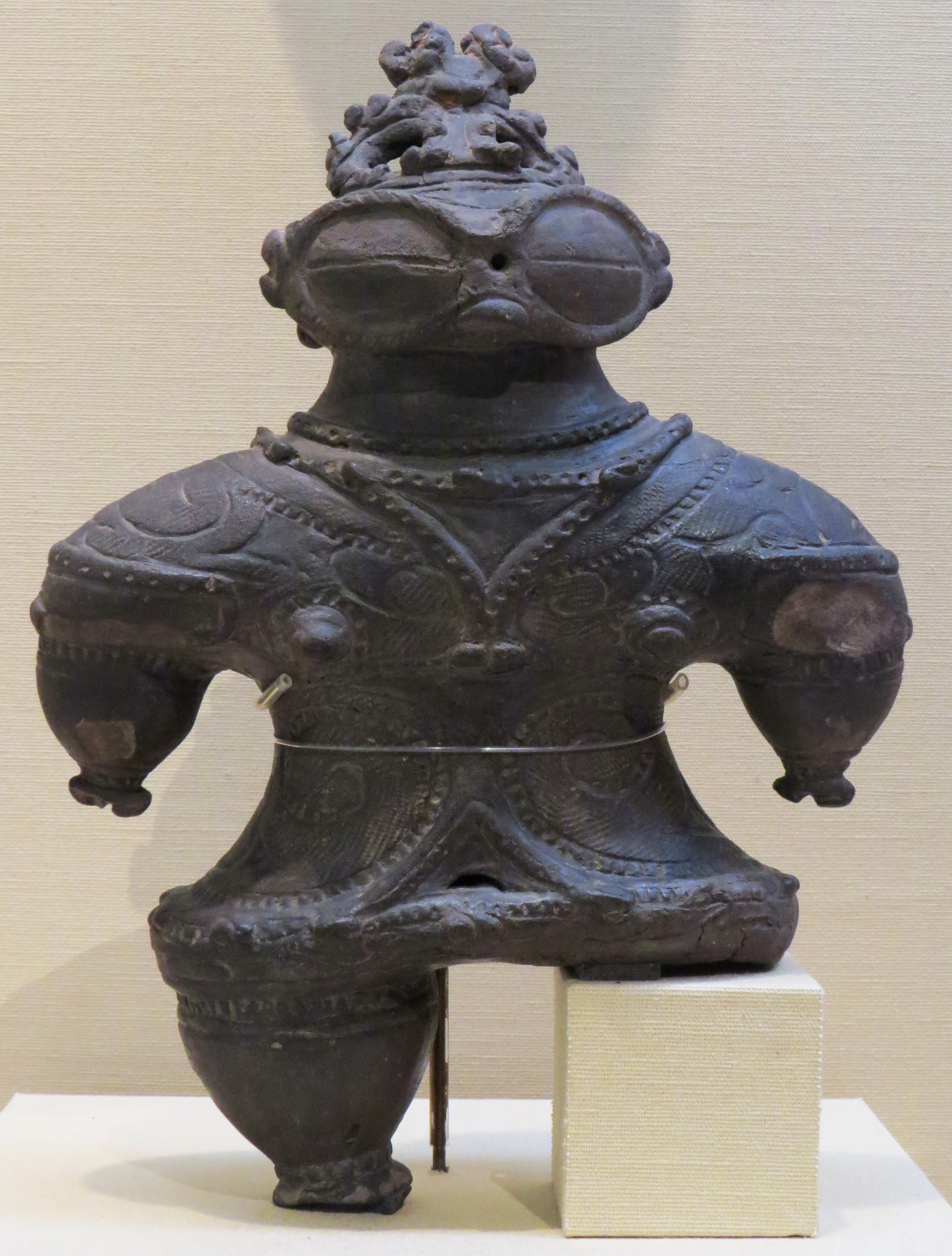
- Korekawa Jōmon Kan

- Kamegaoka Site Kamegaoka Stone Age Site (Japan)
- 40°53′5.62″N 140°20′22.45″E
- Type: settlement, midden
- Periods: Final Jōmon period
- Location: Tsugaru, Aomori, Japan
- Region: Tōhoku region

History
- Built: 1,000 – 300 BC

Site notes
- Area: 38,887.99 square metres (418,586.8 sq ft)
- Owner: National Historic Site
- Public access: Yes

The Kamegaoka Site (亀ヶ岡石器時代遺跡, Kamegaoka sekki-jidai iseki) is an archaeological site in what is now part of the city of Tsugaru, Aomori Prefecture, in the Tōhoku region of northern Japan, containing the ruins of a Jōmon period settlement. The remains were designated a National Historic Site in 1944 by the Japanese government. It is also referred to as the "Kamegaoka Stone Age Site", although the remains discovered are from the final Jōmon period (1,000 – 300 BC), rather than the Japanese Paleolithic period, as the name would imply. It is located approximately 20 minutes by car from Goshogawara Station.

== Overview ==
The site is located on a tongue-shaped plateau at an elevation of seven to eighteen meters above surrounding lowland swamps along the left bank of the Iwaki River on the Tsugaru Peninsula in western Aomori Prefecture. The site contained pit dwellings, a graveyard with mounds and pit graves containing numerous grave goods, including many finished and unfinished Jōmon pottery pieces, clay figurines, lacquer objects and jade beads, including magatama. Other artifacts include pottery painted in red and black and lacquerware in a distinctive style, based on which archaeologists have named this site a type site for the “Kamegaoka culture”.

One of the most famous objects found was a large clay figure (Dogū), discovered in 1887. Known as a Shakōki-dogū, or "goggle-eyed type" figurine, it appears to be wearing some form of snow goggles, and has exaggerated, feminine buttocks, chest and thighs. It is now kept at the Tokyo National Museum, and is an Important Cultural Property. It is recognized internationally as a relic representative of Japan’s Jomon culture.

The site has been known and excavated since the Edo period, when clay figurines and pottery were discovered in 1622 when Tsugaru Nobuhira, the second daimyō of Tsugaru Domain built a fortification. Some examples of the ancient pottery was prized for the Japanese tea ceremony and some examples, along with clay figurines were even exported to Europe through Dutch traders at Nagasaki.

The site has been submitted for inscription on the UNESCO World Heritage List as one of the Jōmon Archaeological Sites in Hokkaidō, Northern Tōhoku, and other regions.

== See also ==
- List of Historic Sites of Japan (Aomori)
- Jōmon Archaeological Sites in Hokkaidō, Northern Tōhoku, and other regions
