= Kawasaki =

Kawasaki (Japanese: 川崎, romanized: Kawasaki, lit. 'river peninsula') may refer to:

== Places ==
- Kawasaki, Kanagawa, a Japanese city
  - Kawasaki-ku, Kawasaki, a ward in Kawasaki, Kanagawa
  - Kawasaki City Todoroki Arena
  - Kawasaki Stadium, a multi-sport stadium
- Kawasaki, Fukuoka, a Japanese town
- Kawasaki, Iwate, a Japanese village
- Kawasaki, Miyagi, a Japanese town
- Tokyo-Yokohama-Kawasaki, Japanese conurbation

== Transportation ==
- Kawasaki Route (Japanese: 川崎線, romanized: Kawasaki-sen), a toll road of the Shuto expressway system in Greater Tokyo
- Kawasaki line, several lines
- Kawasaki station, several stations

== Businesses ==
- Kawasaki Heavy Industries (KHI), a Japanese manufacturer of aerospace equipment, ATVs, engines, industrial plants, motorcycles, jet skis, ships, tractors, trains and so on
  - Kawasaki Heavy Industries Motorcycle & Engine, a division of Kawasaki Heavy Industries
    - Kawasaki motorcycles
    - Kawasaki Motors Racing, the European subsidiary of Kawasaki Heavy Industries
  - Kawasaki Shipbuilding Corporation, the shipbuilding subsidiary of Kawasaki Heavy Industries
  - Kawasaki Heavy Industries Rolling Stock Company, the railroad division of Kawasaki Heavy Industries
  - Kawasaki Aerospace Company, the aerospace division of Kawasaki Heavy Industries
- Kawasaki Kisen Kaisha or K Line, a Japanese transport company
- Kawasaki Steel Corporation, predecessor of JFE Holdings

== People ==
- Kawasaki (surname), a Japanese surname

== Other uses ==
- Battle of Kawasaki, at Kawasaki, Mutsu, Japan; in 1057 in the Zenkunen War between the Abe clan and Minamoto clan
- Kawasaki disease (Kawasaki's), a vascular disease found primarily in young children
- Kawasaki Racecourse, a horseracing dirt track, in Kawasaki, Kanagawa, Japan
- Shaking rat Kawasaki, the Kawasaki lineage of laboratory rat animals
- Kawasaki-type oiler (Japanese: 川崎型油槽船, romanized: Kawasaki-gata Yusōsen), an oil tanker and refueller ship class

== See also ==
- Kawasaki Frontale, a football (soccer) club in Kawasaki, Kanagawa
- Verdy Kawasaki, former name of current Tokyo Verdy, a football (soccer) club
- Kawa (disambiguation)
- Saki (disambiguation)
