= Kawasaki (surname) =

Origin
- Language: Japanese

Other names
- Variant forms: 川崎, 川﨑, 川嵜, 河崎

Kawasaki is a surname of Japanese origin (most commonly 川崎, but also 川﨑, 川嵜, 河崎, etc.).

== Notable people surnamed Kawasaki ==
- Audrey Kawasaki (born 1982), American artist
- Ayumi Kawasaki (born 1984), Japanese vert skater
- Carolyn Kawasaki aka Caiya Kawasaki (born 1962), American Gaijin tarento
- Guy Kawasaki (born 1954), American author and venture capitalist
- Itsuro Kawasaki (川崎 逸朗), Japanese anime director
- Jirō Kawasaki (born 1947), Japanese politician
- Kyozi Kawasaki (1930–2021), Japanese physicist
- Masahiro Kawasaki (1949–2006), Japanese musician and composer
- Minoru Kawasaki (film director) (born 1958), Japanese film director, screenwriter and producer
- Minoru Kawasaki (politician) (born 1961), Japanese politician
- Munenori Kawasaki (born 1981), Japanese baseball shortstop
- Ryo Kawasaki (1947–2020), Japanese musician
- Scott Kawasaki (born 1975), American politician
- Shinji Kawasaki (1921–2007), Japanese linguist and archaeologist
- Sakura Kawasaki (born 2003), Japanese singer, actress, and model
- Tomisaku Kawasaki (1925–2020), Japanese pediatrician after whom Kawasaki disease is named
- Kawasaki Shōzō (1837–1912), Japanese industrialist, and shipbuilder
- Toshikazu Kawasaki (born 1955), Japanese paperfolder
- Uzume Kawasaki (born 1997), Japanese rhythmic gymnast
- Yasumasa Kawasaki (川﨑 裕大; born 1992), Japanese footballer
- Yosuke Kawasaki (born 1977), American musician
- Yukari Kawasaki (born 1976), Japanese Olympic archer
- Yukiko Kawasaki (born 1977), Japanese figure skater

== Fictional characters ==
- Chef Kawasaki, a fictional character from the Kirby series of video games
- General Kawasaki, from Ikari Warriors

== See also ==
- Kawasaki (disambiguation)
