= Kawasaki station =

Kawasaki station may refer to:

- Kawasaki-juku (Japanese: 川崎宿, romanized: Kawasaki-shuku, lit. 'Kawasaki lodging'), a Tōkaidō waystation in Kawasaki-ku, Kawasaki, Kanagawa, Japan
- Kawasaki Station (Japanese: 川崎駅, romanized: Kawasaki-eki, lit. 'Kawasaki Station', a train station of JR East line in Kawasaki, Kanagawa, Japan
- Shin-Kawasaki Station (Japanese: (新川崎駅, romanized: shin-Kawasaki-eki, lit. 'New Kawasaki Station'), Saiwai, Kawasaki, Kanagawa, Japan; a train station
- Kawasaki-Daishi Station (Japanese: 川崎大師駅, romanized: Kawasaki-Daishi-eki, lit. 'Grand Kawasaki Station'), Kawasaki-ku, Kawasaki, Kanagawa Prefecture, Japan; a train station on the Keikyu Line
- Keikyū Kawasaki Station (Japanese: 京急川崎駅, romanized: Keikyū Kawasaki-eki, lit. 'Keikyu Line station Kawasaki', a train station on the Keikyuu Line in Kawasaki, Kanagawa, Japan
- Hama-Kawasaki Station (Japanese: 浜川崎駅, romanized: Hama-Kawasaki-eki, lit. 'Kawasaki Beach Station'), a train station of JR East line in Kawasaki-ku, Kawasaki, Kanagawa, Japan
- Kawasakishimmachi Station (Japanese: 川崎新町駅, romanized: Kawasaki-Shinmachi-eki, lit. 'Kawasaki New Town Station'), a train station on the Nambu Branch Line in Kawasaki-ku, Kawasaki, Kanagawa, Japan
- Kawasaki-Gashi Freight Terminal (Japanese: 川崎河岸駅, romanized: Kawasaki-gashi-eki, lit. 'Kawasaki Riverside Station'), Sawai, Kawasaki, Kanagawa, Japan; a freight rail line station of the JNR
- Buzen-Kawasaki Station (Japanese: 豊前川崎駅, romanized: Buzen-Kawasaki-eki, lit. 'Buzen and Kawasaki station'), a train station on the Hitahikosan Line of JR Kyushu, in Kawasaki, Fukuoka, Japan
