= Kawasaki-Gashi Freight Terminal =

Coordinates: 35.538896°N 139.69628°E

Kawasaki-Gashi Freight Terminal 川崎河岸駅

General information
- Location: Saiwai, Kawasaki, Kanagawa; Japan
- Operator: Japanese National Railways
- Line: Nambu Line

History
- Opened: 1927
- Closed: 1972
Location

Kawasaki-Gashi Freight Terminal (川崎河岸駅, Kawasaki-gashi-eki) was a freight railway station of Japanese National Railways located in Saiwai-ku, Kawasaki, Kanagawa, Japan. The freight terminal was the end of a 1.7-kilometer branchline of the Nambu Line from Yakō Station.

== History ==
For the opening of its first lines on March 9, 1927, Nambu Railway (as called until its nationalization in 1944) built two terminals in Kawasaki: Kawasaki Station for passengers and Kawasaki-Gashi Freight Terminal for freight. Kawasaki-Gashi Freight Terminal was built on the bank of the Tama River to provide connection between railway and water transport. It would have been economical if the freight terminal had been connected directly from Kawasaki Station, but the railway could not acquire lands for this route.

Initially Kawasaki-Gashi Freight Terminal mainly handled gravel as freight. The gravel was dug from riverbed of the upper Tama River, transported by train, transferred to barges or boats at this terminal, and shipped to consumers along the Tokyo Bay. For this purpose the terminal was equipped with a quay with funnels to drop bulk freight. Nearby industries including Kawasaki Plant of Tokyo Rope Mfg. also used the station. During the World War Two, freight included military supplies.

Kawasaki-Gashi Freight Terminal was closed on May 25, 1972 following the decline of use resulted from expansion of rail and road network in the Tokyo Bay area, as well as the closure of the Tokyo Rope plant in 1969. The station might have been dormant from 1970 as some sources claim the closing in that year.

== Green belt ==
The site of the freight terminal and the branchline was converted to a green belt named Saiwai Ryokudō (さいわい緑道) in 1976. It provides recreational enjoyment for residents of housing complex on the Tokyo Rope plant site.
