= Shinji Kawasaki =

Japanese archaeologist

Shinji Kawasaki (川崎 真治, Kawasaki Shinji) (1921-2007) was a Japanese archaeologist. An expert in petroglyphs and ancient Japanese languages and characters, he has authored a number of books on the origin of the Japanese people and proposed a number of theories. In 1976 he authored a book on the Imperial Family of the Japanese, and another three years later, The Wajin Hozuma Legend of the Silk Road (1979). His 1980 book explored the ancient links of the Japanese with the Jōmon people.
