= Kawasaki Heavy Industries =

Japanese multinational manufacturing company

Kawasaki Heavy Industries, Ltd.

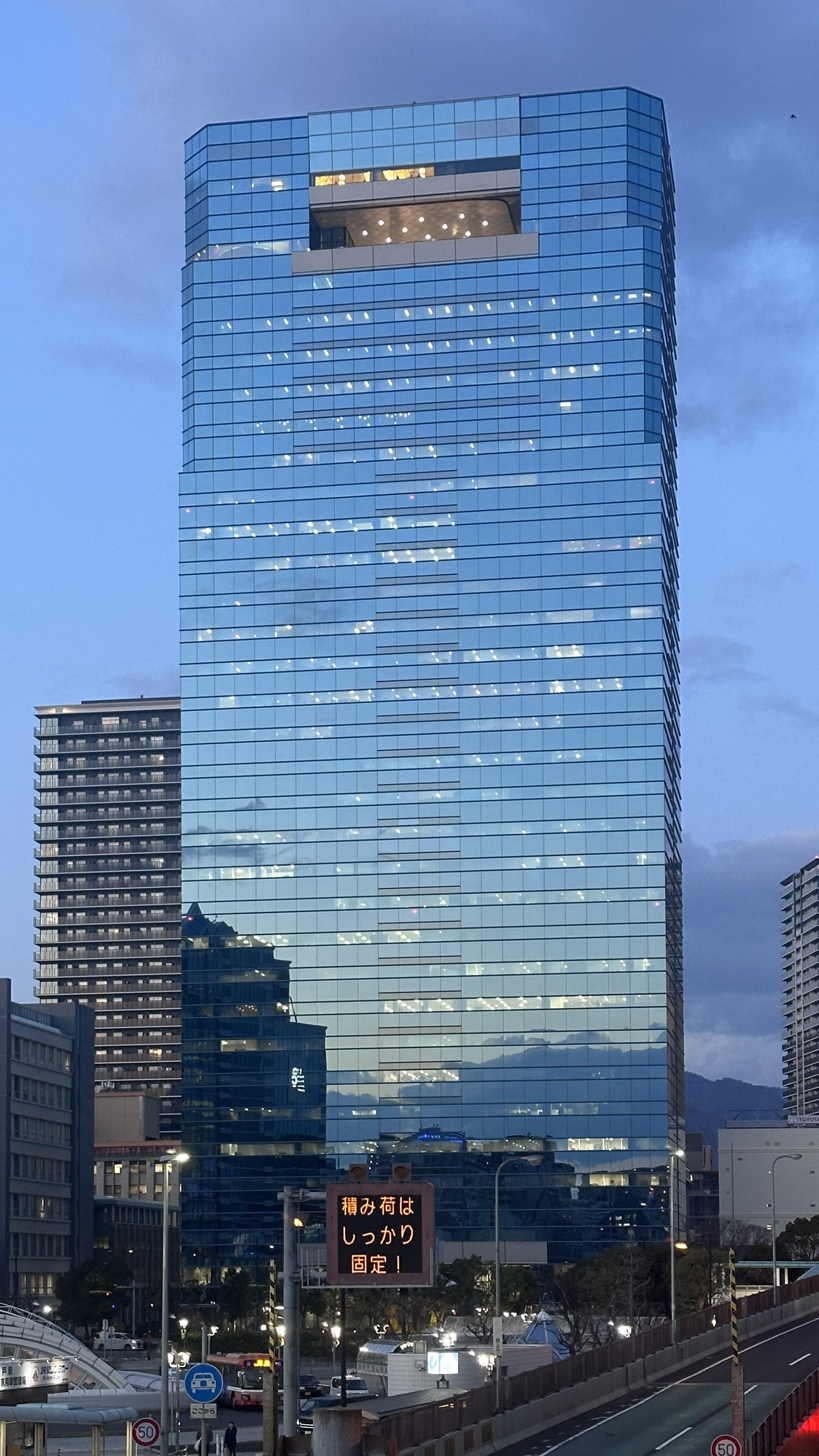
- KHI's Kobe headquarters in Chūō-ku, Kobe, Hyōgo
- Native name: 川崎重工業株式会社
- Romanized name: Kawasaki Jūkōgyō Kabushiki-gaisha
- Type: Public KK
- Traded as: TYO: 7012
- Industry: Heavy equipment Automotive; Defense
- Founded: 15 October 1896; 130 years ago
- Founder: Kawasaki Shōzō
- Headquarters: Minato, Tokyo, Japan
- Key people: Yoshinori Kanehana (Chairman); Yasuhiko Hashimoto (president & CEO)
- Products: Rolling stock, aerospace, shipbuilding, construction, automobiles Kawasaki motor corps
- Revenue: ▲¥1.500 trillion (fiscal year ended March 31, 2022)
- Operating income: ▲¥45.805 billion (fiscal year ended March 31, 2022)
- Net income: ▲¥23.985 billion (fiscal year ended March 31, 2022)
- Total assets: ▲¥2.022 trillion (fiscal year ended March 31, 2022)
- Total equity: ▼¥444.262 billion (fiscal year ended March 31, 2022)
- Number of employees: 34,010 (as of 31 March 2013)
- Subsidiaries: Bimota (49.9%); Kawasaki Heavy Industries Aerospace Company; Kawasaki Railcar Manufacturing; Kawasaki Heavy Industries Ship & Offshore Structure Company; Kawasaki Motors; Modenas (30%)
- Website: www.khi.co.jp (Japanese site) global.kawasaki.com (global site)

Kawasaki Heavy Industries Ltd. (KHI) (川崎重工業株式会社, Kawasaki Jūkōgyō Kabushiki-gaisha) is a Japanese public multinational corporation manufacturer of motorcycles, engines, heavy equipment, aerospace and defense equipment, rolling stock and ships, headquartered in Minato, Tokyo, Japan. It is also active in the production of industrial robots, gas turbines, pumps, boilers and other industrial products. The company is named after its founder, Shōzō Kawasaki. KHI is known as one of the three major heavy industrial manufacturers of Japan, alongside Mitsubishi Heavy Industries and IHI. Prior to the Second World War, KHI was part of the Kobe Kawasaki zaibatsu, which included Kawasaki Steel and Kawasaki Kisen. After the conflict, KHI became part of the DKB Group (keiretsu).

== History ==
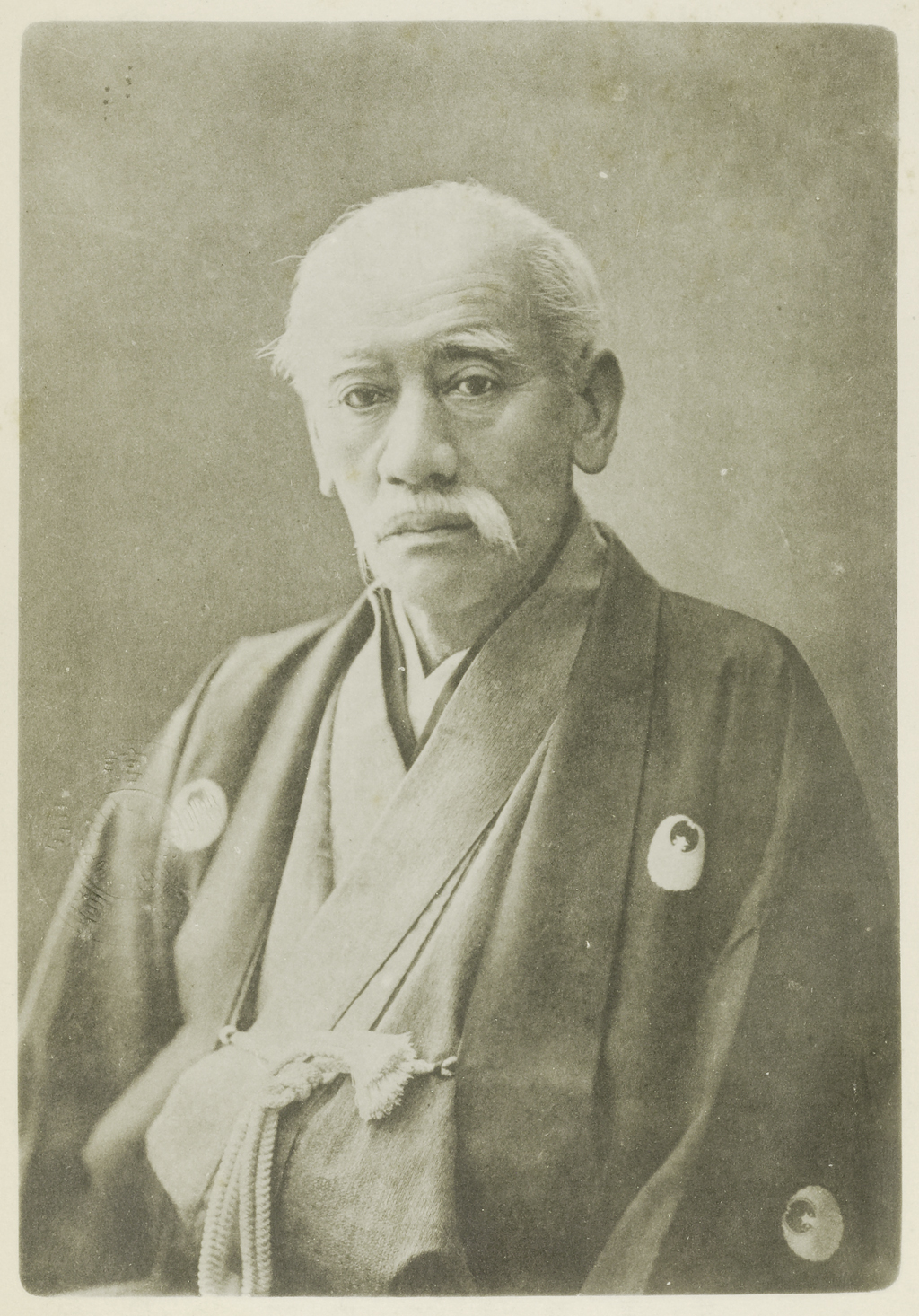
Shōzō Kawasaki, founder of the corporation

Shōzō Kawasaki, born in 1836, was involved with the marine industry from a young age. He was involved with two offshore disasters but accredited his survival to the modernization of the ships. This led to the decision to create technological innovations for the Japanese shipping industry. In 1878, he established Kawasaki Tsukiji Shipyard on land borrowed from the government along the Sumida River. It was originally founded to construct ocean-going ships. The company first struggled to find business until it secured its first order. This is marked as the company's start in the industry. The shipyard facility is considered the first of its kind in Japan and also marked a major step in the country's direction towards being a shipbuilder. After succeeding in his initial venture, Kawasaki formed Kawasaki Hyogo Dockyard, which would later be incorporated in 1896.

In 1886, Kawasaki moved the business from Tokyo to Hyogo. This allowed space for the rise of orders placed to his company and the renaming to Kawasaki Dockyard. The new and improved company went public as Kawasaki Dockyard Co., Ltd when the demand for ships rose during the Sino-Japanese War of 1894. Kojiro Matsukata was announced as the company's first president.

After opening a new factory in 1906, Kawasaki began diversifying its products. They began to produce parts for the railroad, automotive, and airplane industry by the end of World War 1. After the war, along with the Allied arms-limitation agreement in 1912, Kawasaki faced a huge decline in shipbuilding. In 1929, the Depression caused a large amount of financial problems with the company.

During World War 2, Kawasaki was a major builder of combat aircraft like the Ki-61, which killed many Allied aircrew. Just afterwards, they adapted air intakes from combat aircraft to high speed motorcycles. In 1947, the government introduced a new shipbuilding agenda and gave Kawasaki a rise in profits and helped restore the company. The company was able to resume all operations and by the 1950s, Japan was leading as the world's largest shipbuilder.

By the late 1960s into the 1970s Kawasaki had begun to withdraw from the shipbuilding industry and diversified its company, producing motorcycles, jet skis, bridges, tunnel-boring machines, and aircraft. They also supplied technologically advanced railroad cars to the New York subway system.

In 1995, Kawasaki Heavy Industries came to an agreement with China to produce the largest containerships ever. This led to the company announcing higher than expected profits in 1996. These proved to be short-lived, as the company saw a long decline in business forcing them to find a solution.

With the company seeing continuous losses into the 21st century, it formed a joint venture with Ishikawajima-Harima Heavy Industries Co. The two companies separated again in the end of 2001. In the following years, Kawasaki Heavy Industries Co. have seen a fluctuation of profits and losses.

== Products ==
=== Aerospace ===
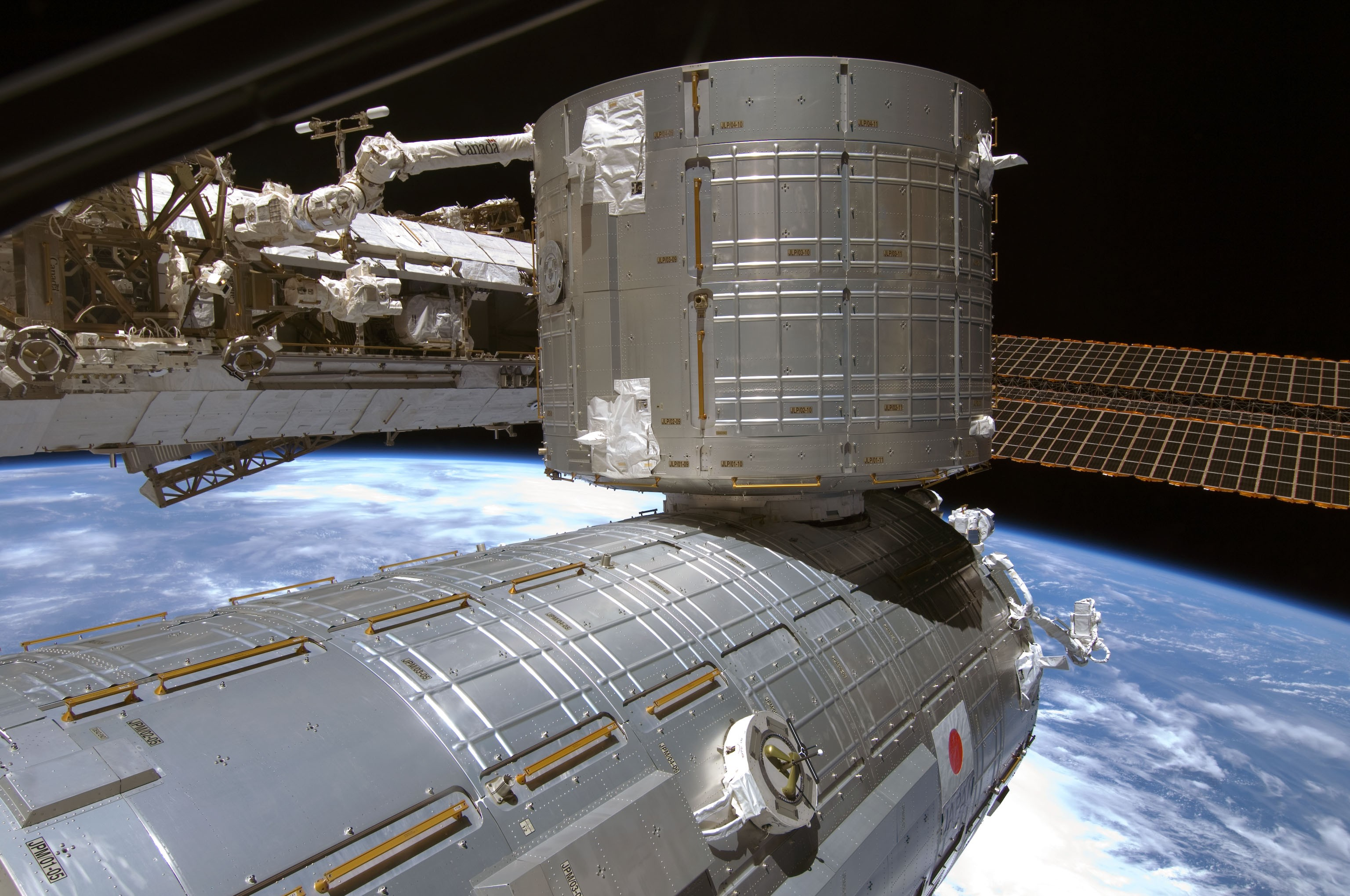
The Japanese Experiment Module Kibō (きぼう, 'Hope')

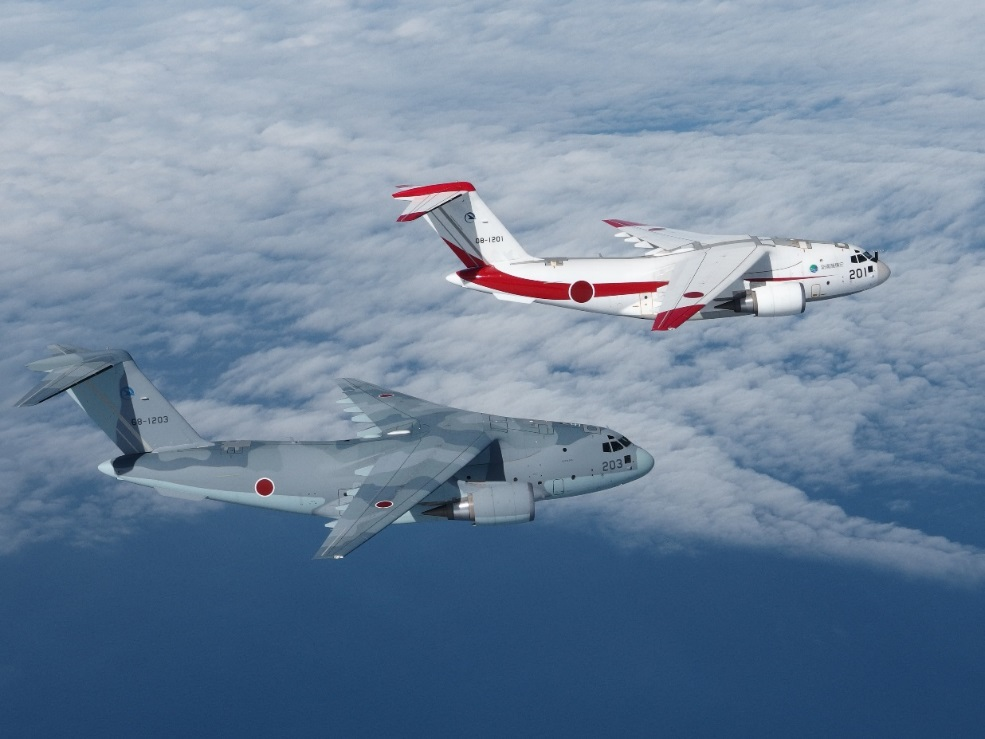
Kawasaki C-2 military transport aircraft

Kawasaki is active in a diverse range of the aerospace industry. The company is a contractor for the Japanese ministry of defence and has built aircraft such as the C-1 transport aircraft, T-4 intermediate jet trainer, and the P-3C antisubmarine warfare patrol airplane. Since 2007, it has built the P-1 maritime patrol aircraft, and since 2010, it has built the C-2 transport aircraft. Kawasaki also builds helicopters, including the BK117, jointly developed and manufactured with MBB. It also produces the CH-47J / JA helicopter.

In the commercial aviation business, the company is involved in the joint international development and production of large passenger aircraft. It is involved in joint development and production of the Boeing 767, Boeing 777 and Boeing 787 with The Boeing Company, and the 170, 175, 190 and 195 jets with Empresa Brasileira de Aeronáutica. It is also involved in the joint international development and production of turbofan engines for passenger aircraft such as the V2500, the RB211/Trent, the PW4000 and the CF34.

Kawasaki also works for the JAXA. The company was responsible for the development and production of the payload fairings, payload attach fittings (PAF) and the construction of the launch complex for the H-II rocket. It continues to provide services for the H-IIA rocket.

Kawasaki has also participated in projects such as the development of reusable launch vehicles for spacecraft that will handle future space transport, space robotics projects such as the Japanese Experiment Module for the International Space Station, the cancelled HOPE-X experimental orbiting plane and the docking mechanism for the ETS-VII. According to a document from July 1997, they would have been a major manufacturer of the Kankoh-maru space tourism vehicle (also known as the Kawasaki S-1), which never saw production.

In 2022, Kawasaki and Airbus signed a memorandum of understanding to address hydrogen needs in aviation, and to focus on airport hydrogen hubs development.

Main products

- Aircraft
- Space systems
- Helicopters
- Simulators
- Jet engines
- Missiles
- Electronic equipment

=== Rolling stock ===
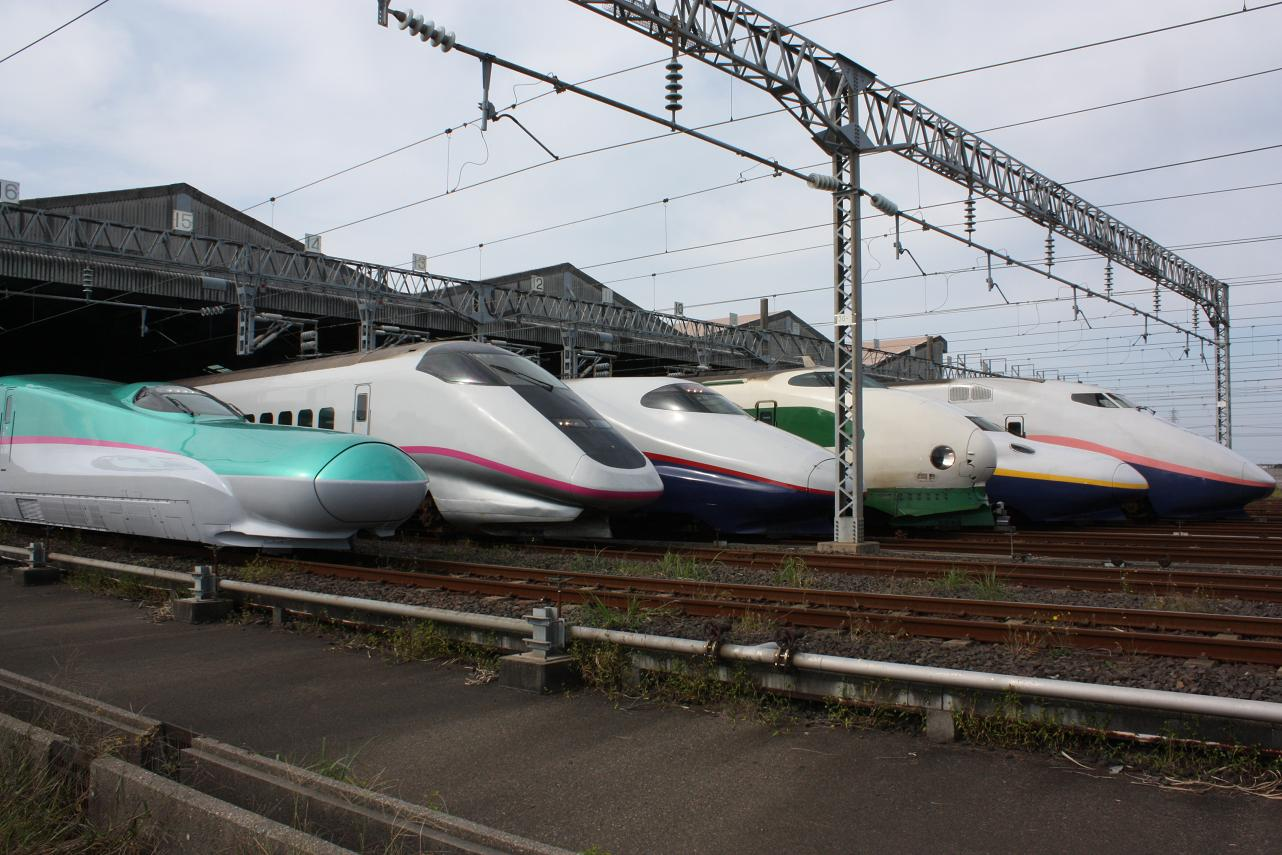
Lineup of JR East Shinkansen trains, October 2009

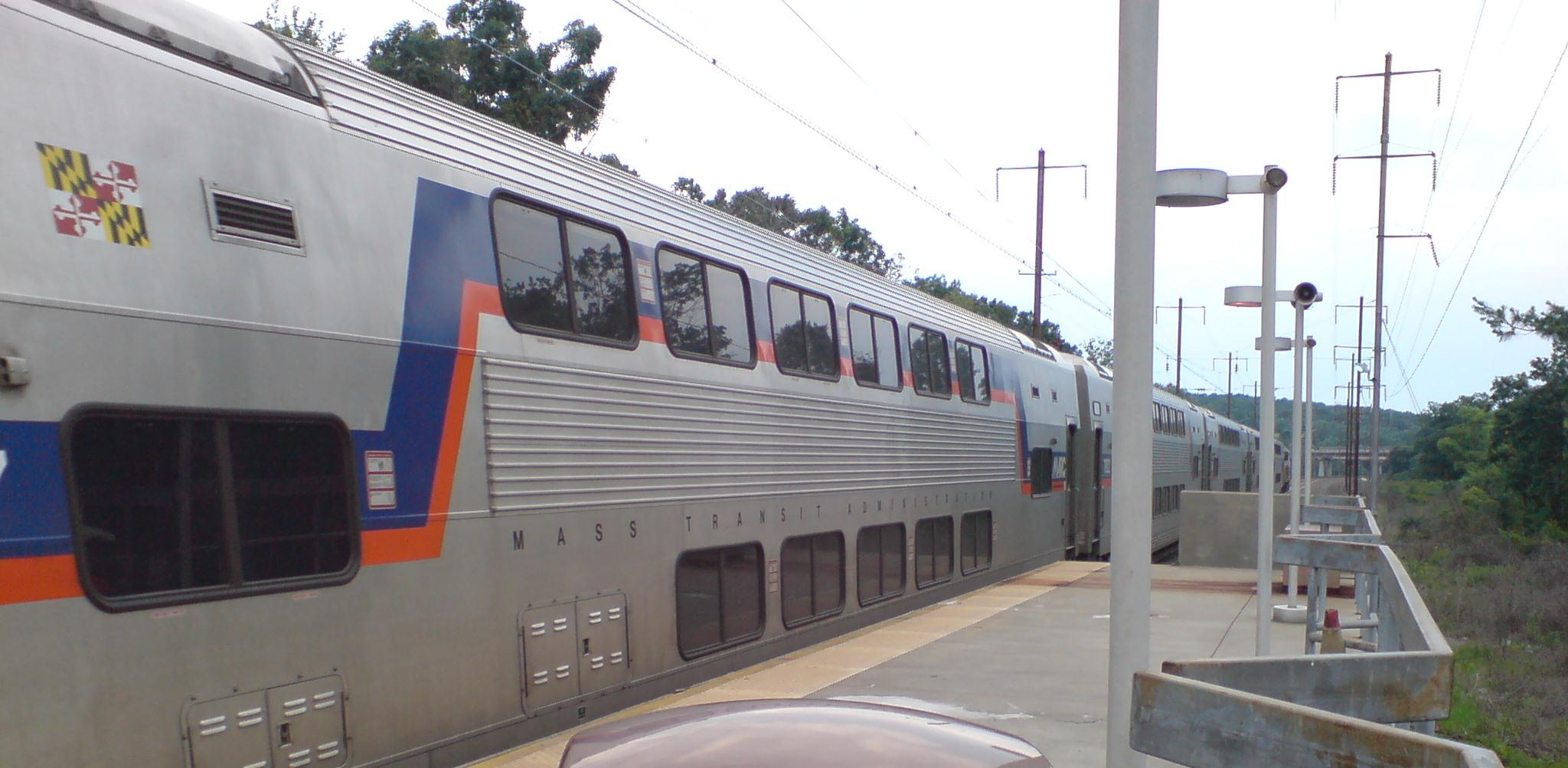
A train of Kawasaki MARC III bi-levels at BWI Rail Station on the Penn Line headed towards Baltimore.

Kawasaki is Japan's largest manufacturer of rolling stock. It began operations in the industry in 1906. It manufactures express and commuter trains, subway cars, freight trains, locomotives, monorails and new transit systems. Kawasaki is also involved in the development and design of high-speed trains such as Japan's Shinkansen.

Main Products

- Electric cars (including Shinkansen trains)
- Monorails
- Passenger coaches and freight cars
- Diesel locomotives
- Electric locomotives
- Platform screen door systems
- Passenger coaches and freight cars integrated transit systems

=== Shipbuilding ===
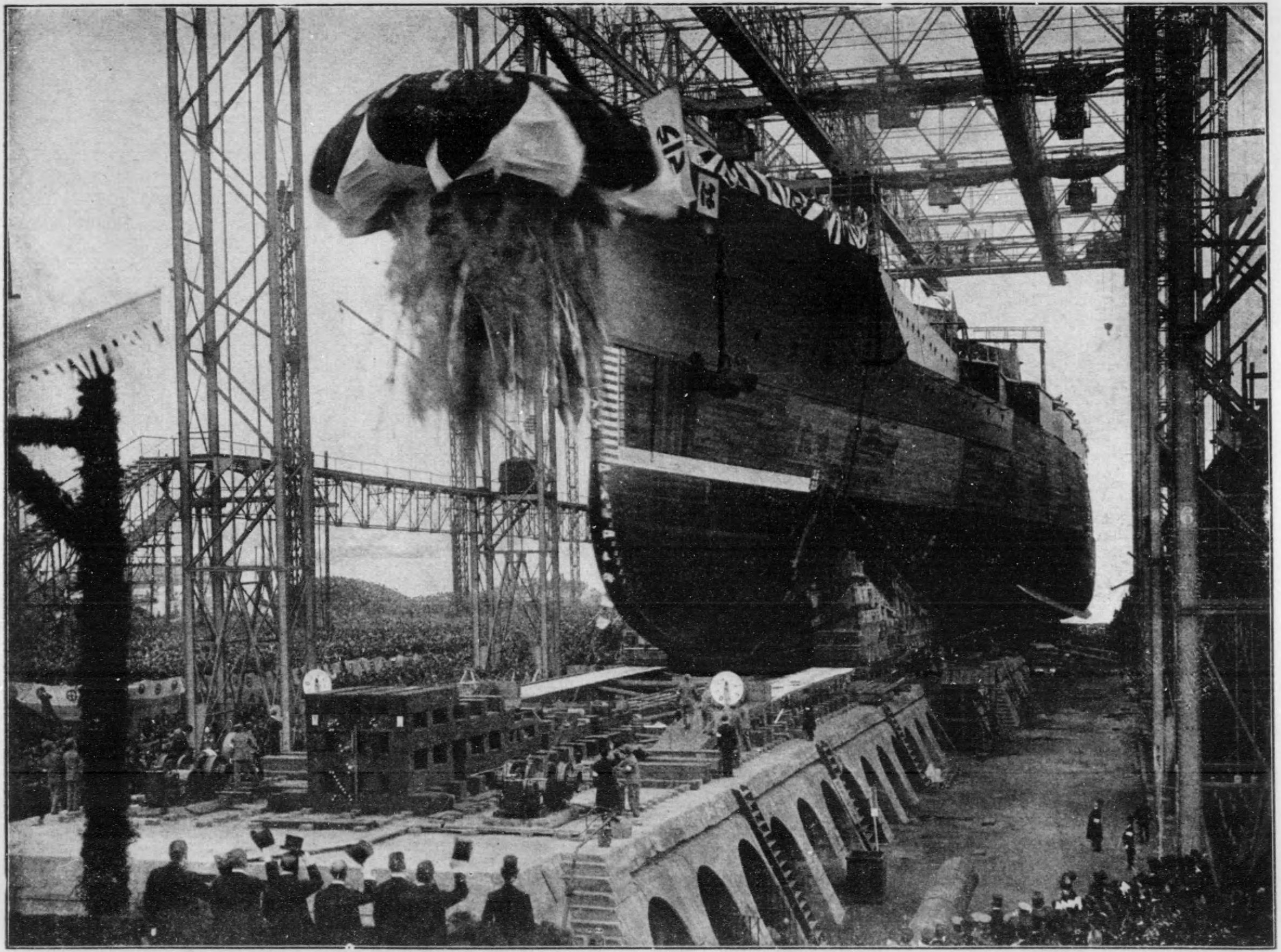
Launch of battleship Haruna at the Kawasaki Shipbuilding Yard, Kobe, 1913

Shipbuilding is the historical industry in which Kawasaki Heavy Industries was created and developed, as from the company's 1878 founding as the Kawasaki Dockyard Co.

Kawasaki Shipbuilding Corporation is a wholly owned subsidiary of Kawasaki Heavy Industries. Its product range include high-performance LNG and LPG carriers, container ships, bulk carriers and VLCCs, as well as submarines. The company is also involved in the development of offshore structures and research vessels.

Kawasaki also produces marine machinery and equipment, including main engines, propulsion systems, steering gears, deck and fishing machinery.

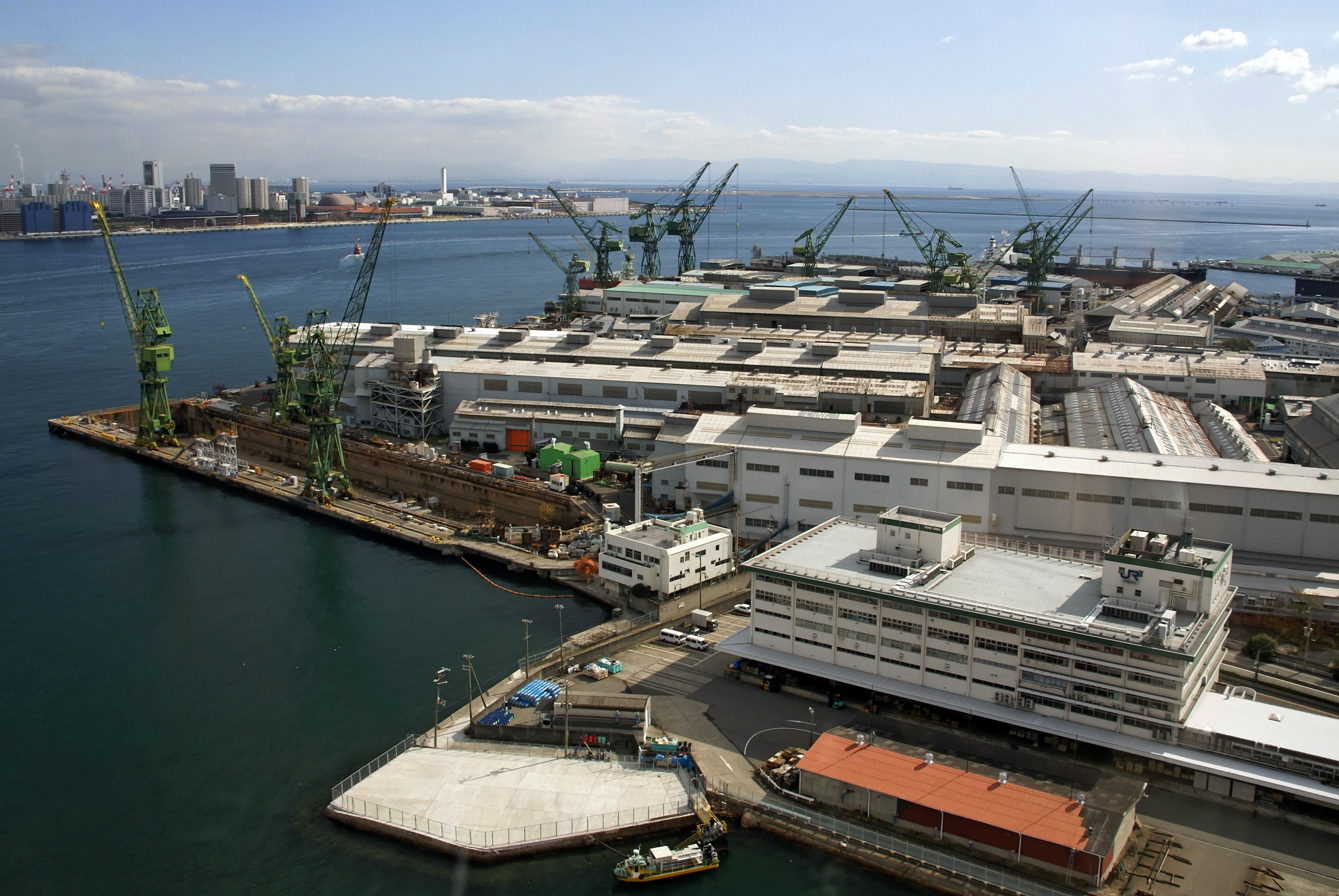
Kawasaki Shipbuilding Corp – Kobe Works, 2007

Kawasaki has shipyards at Kobe and Sakaide, Kagawa. (Kagawa Prefecture). The company also builds ships as a part of joint ventures with COSCO in China, i.e. the Nantong COSCO KHI Ship Engineering Co., Ltd.(NACKS), in Nantong, China, and the Dalian COSCO KHI Ship Engineering Co., Ltd.(DACKS), in Dalian, China.

On 3 July 2024, the Japanese Defence Ministry announced an investigation into bribery allegations between Kawasaki and Maritime Self-Defence Force personnel over submarine repair contracts. Kawasaki will also set up its own inspection panel to look into fictitious transactions and slush funds.

Main products

- LNG carriers
- LPG carriers
- Container ships
- High speed vessels
- Submarines
- VLCCs (very large crude carriers)
- Bulk carriers
- Offshore structures
- Marine machinery and equipment

=== Energy plants and facilities ===
Kawasaki's key offering are high-performance gas turbines. The company is also involved in development of new energy sources as an alternative to fossil fuels such as wind power generation, biomass power generation, photovoltaic systems and rechargeable batteries.

Main products

- Small and medium-sized gas turbine generators
- Gas turbine cogeneration systems
- Gas engines
- Diesel engines
- Wind turbine generators
- Ash handling systems
- Combined cycle power plants
- Nuclear power plant equipment
- Boilers

=== Industrial equipment ===
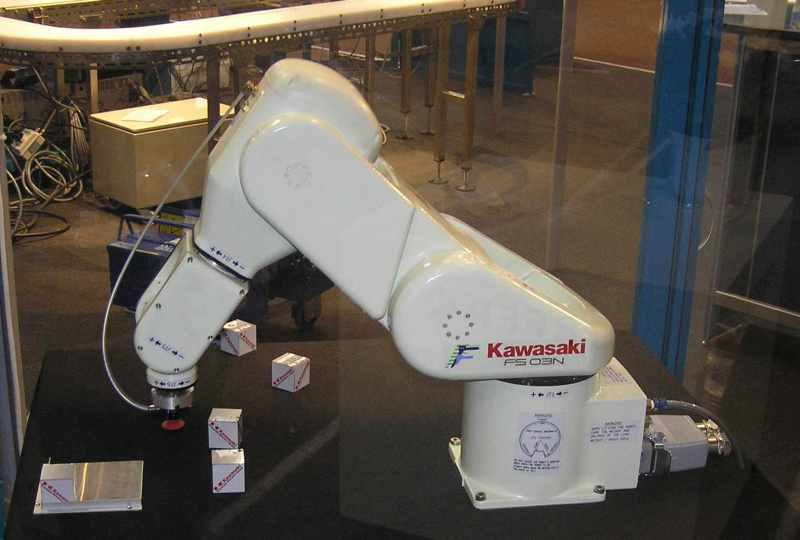
Kawasaki FS-03N industrial robot

Kawasaki develops and builds a vast array of industrial plants and equipment, including large cement, chemical and nonferrous metal plants, prime movers, and compact precision machinery. It also offers industrial plant engineering from design to sales.

Kawasaki also develops automation systems. Industrial robots for processes such as assembly, handling, welding, painting and sealing, as well as automation systems for distribution and logistics such as automated product- and cargo-handling systems for plants and airports.

Main products

- Industrial plants
- Industrial robots
- Aerodynamic machinery
- Hydraulic equipment

=== Environment and recycling ===
Kawasaki is involved in the development of equipment that prevents pollution in a wide range of industries. Among the leading products are fuel gas desulfurization and denitrification systems, and ash handling systems. The company also supplies municipal refuse incineration plants, gasification and melting systems, sewage treatment and sludge incineration plants.

Kawasaki has also been developing systems that enable a wide range of municipal and industrial waste to be recovered, recycled and put to new use. Such systems include refuse paper and plastic fuel production facilities that convert wastepaper/plastics into an easy-to-handle solid fuel, equipment that converts old tires into highway paving materials and tiles, and machinery that sorts glass bottles by size and color.

Main products

- Municipal refuse incineration plants
- Water treatment systems
- Industrial waste recycling equipment
- Flue-gas desulfurization equipment

=== Infrastructure ===
Kawasaki's history of building steel structures spans more than a century, with bridge-building among its first businesses. The company offers of storage management for LNG,

Kawasaki's portfolio also includes retractable roofs, floors and other giant structures, the Sapporo Dome's retractable surface is one example.

For construction, Kawasaki produces products such as wheel loaders, tunnel machines, rollers, snowplows and purpose-specific loaders. The tunnel boring machines used to excavate the Channel Tunnel and the 14.14 m diameter shield machines used in the Tokyo Bay Aqua-Line construction are two well-known examples.

Main products

- Wheel loaders
- Construction machinery
- Shield Machines
- Tunnel boring machines
- Steel bridges
- LNG and LPG tanks
- Airport and port-related products
- Snowplows

=== Transportation ===
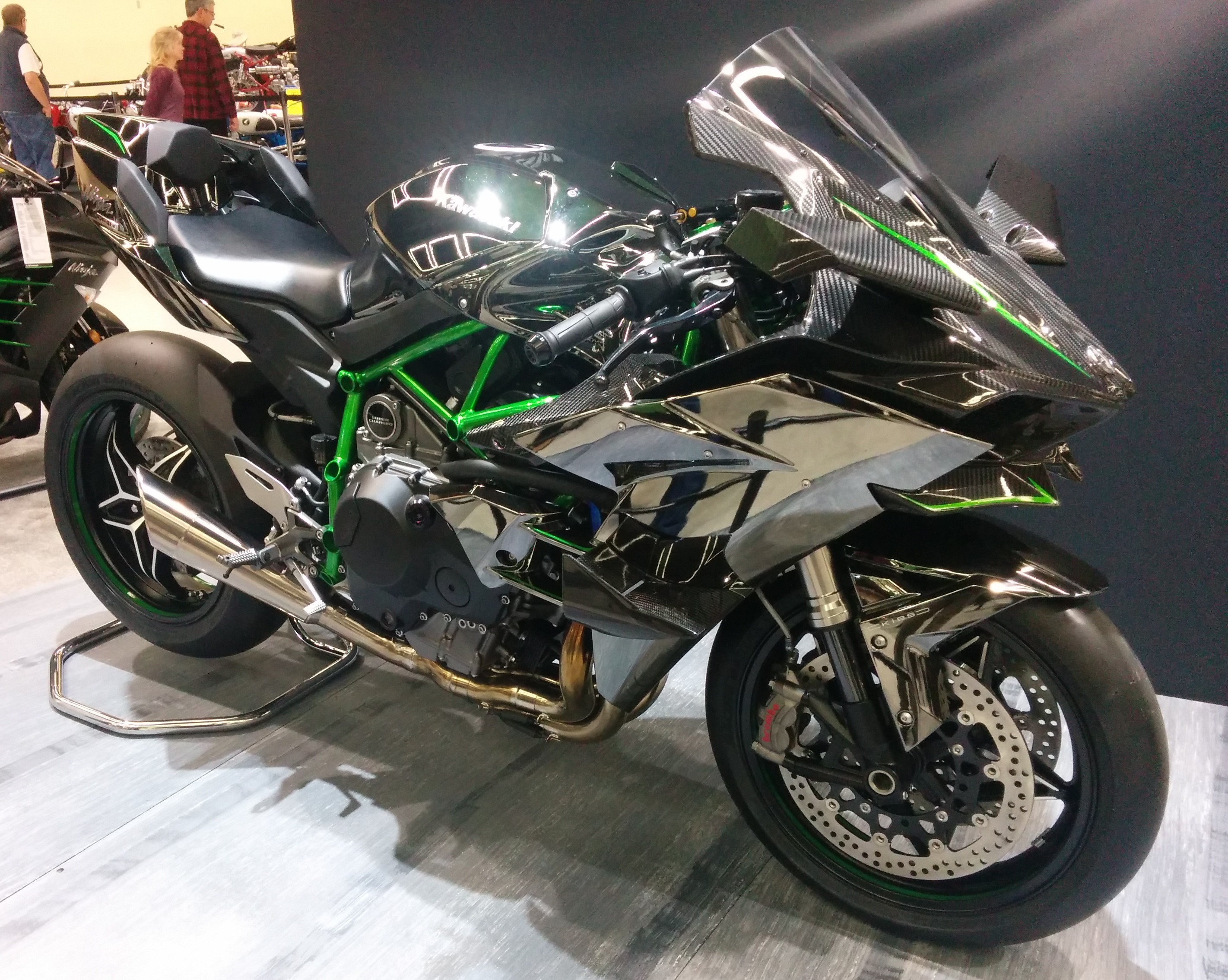
Kawasaki Ninja H2R

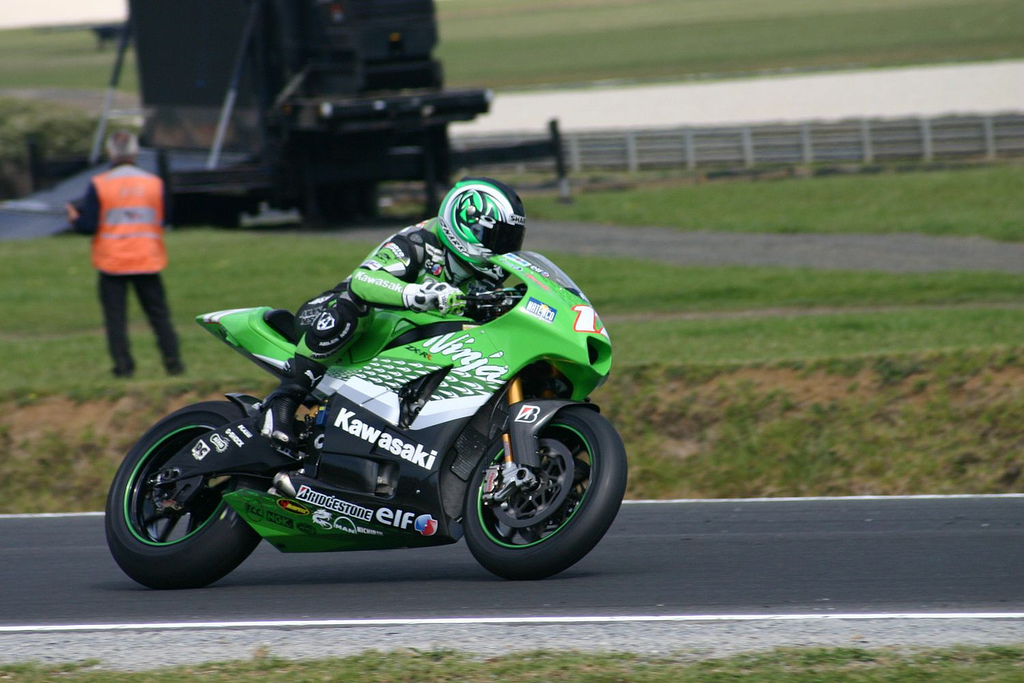
Kawasaki Ninja ZX-RR

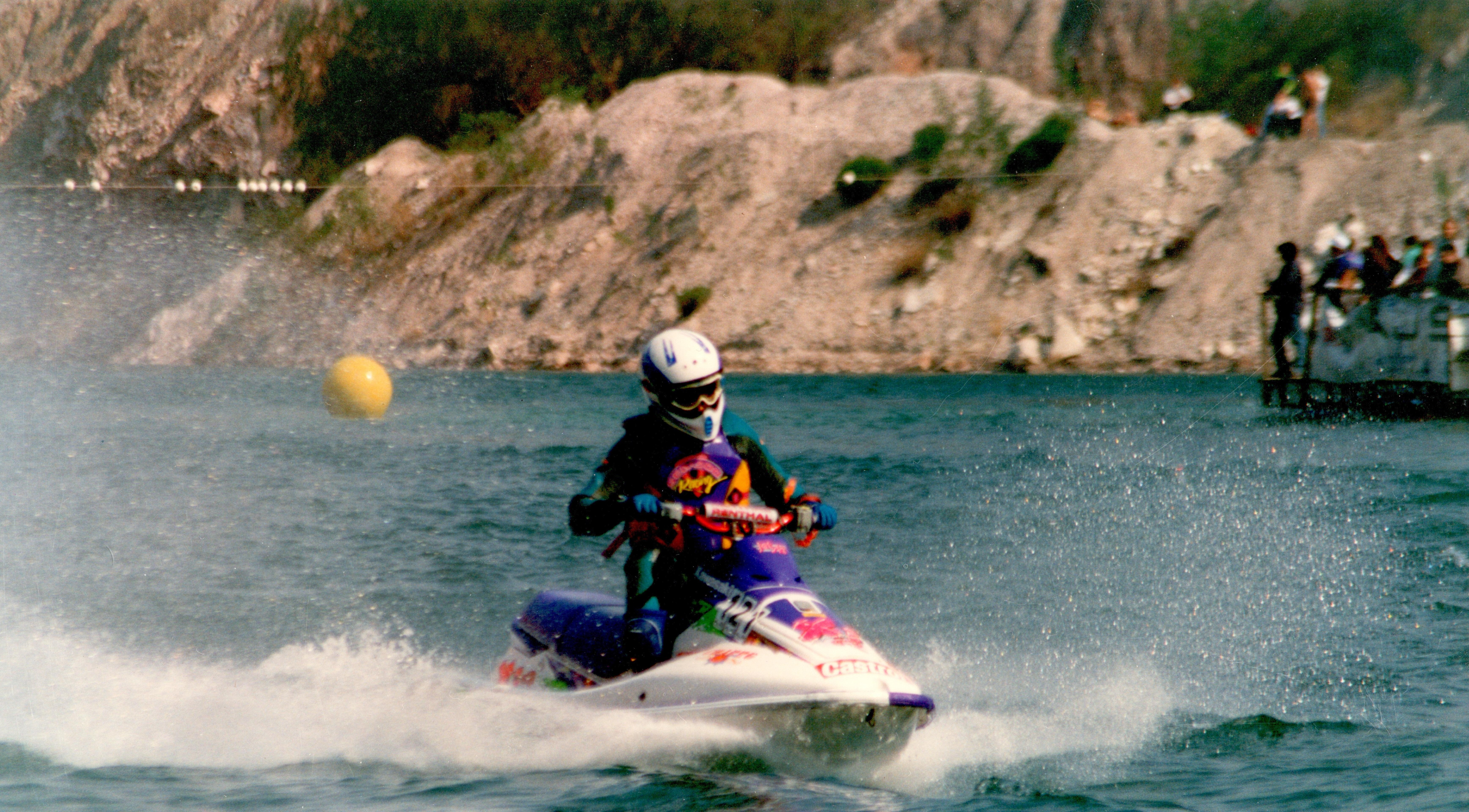
Kawasaki XI750R

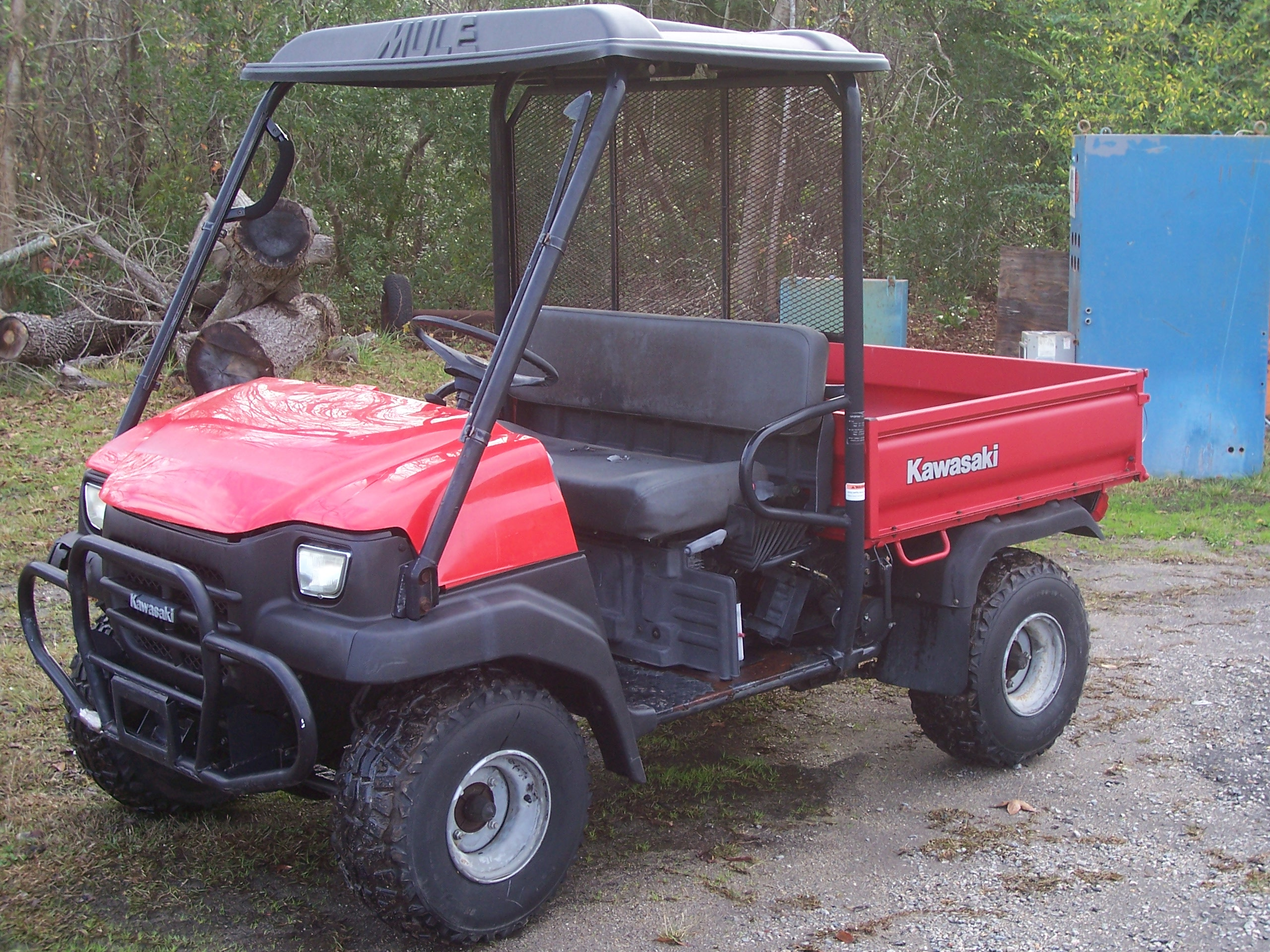
Kawasaki Mule 3010

Kawasaki produces motorcycles, Jet Skis and ATVs. Kawasaki's motorcycle include the Ninja sport bikes, and cruisers, dual-purpose and motocross motorcycles, as well as utility vehicles, ATVs and general-purpose gasoline engines. Kawasaki's "Jet Ski" has become a genericized trademark for any type of personal watercraft.

== Affiliates and subsidiaries ==
=== Japan ===
- Akashi Ship Model Basin Co., Ltd.
- Alna Yusoki-Yohin Co., Ltd.
- Benic Solution Corp.
- EarthTechnica Co., Ltd.
- Enetec Co., Ltd.
- Fukae Powtec Corp.
- JP Steel Plantech Co.
- Kawaju Akashi Service Co., Ltd.
- Kawasaki Engineering Co., Ltd.
- Kawasaki Oita Manufacturing Co., Ltd.
- Kawasaki Metal Industries, Ltd.
- Kawasaki Setsubi Kogyo Co., Ltd.
- Kawasaki Shipbuilding Corporation
- Kawasaki Plant Systems, Ltd.
- Kawasaki Precision Machinery Ltd.
- Kawasaki Machine Systems, Ltd.
- Kawasaki Motors Corporation Japan
- Kawasaki Hydromechanics Corp.
- Kawasaki Life Corporation
- Kawasaki Naval Engine Service, Ltd.
- Kawaju Akashi Engineering Co., Ltd.
- KEE Environmental Construction, Co. Ltd.
- KEE Environmental Service, Ltd.
- Kawaju Gifu Service Co., Ltd.
- Kawaju Gifu Engineering Co., Ltd.
- Kawasaki Prime Mover Engineering Co., Ltd.
- Kawasaki Construction Co., Ltd.
- Kawasaki Rolling Stock Technology Co., Ltd.
- Kawaju Shoji Co., Ltd.
- Kawaju Techno Service Corp.
- Kawaju Tokyo Service Corp.
- Kawaju Facilitech Co., Ltd.
- Kawasaki Thermal Engineering Co., Ltd.
- K Career Partners Corp.
- K-GES Co., Ltd.
- K-Tec Corp.
- KGM (Kawaju Gifu Manufacturing) Co., Ltd.
- Kawasaki Setsubi Kogyo Co., Ltd.
- Kawasaki Construction Machinery, Hokkaido Ltd.
- Kawaju Sakaide Service Co., Ltd.
- Kawaju Kobe Support Co., Ltd.
- Kawaju Marine Engineering Co., Ltd.
- KHI JPS Co., Ltd.
- Kawasaki Shipbuilding Inspection Co., Ltd.
- Kawasaki Gas Turbine Research Center Ltd.
- Nichijo Manufacturing Co., Ltd.
- NIPPI Corporation
- Sapporo Kawasaki Rolling Stock Engineering Co., Ltd.
- Technica Corp.
- Union Precision Die Co., Ltd.

=== International ===
==== East Asia ====
- Kawasaki Marine Machinery Co. Ltd. (Wuhan, Hubei, China)
- Kawasaki Heavy Industries Ship Engineering Co. Ltd. (Nantong, Jiangsu, China; COSCO)
- Kawasaki Heavy Industries Machinery Trading Co. Ltd. (Shanghai, China)
- Kawasaki Heavy Industries Technology Co. Ltd. (Dalian, Liaoning, China)
- Kawasaki Precision Machinery (China) Ltd.
- Kawasaki Robotics Co. Ltd. (Tianjin, China)
- Kawasaki Heavy Industries Ltd. (Hong Kong)
- Kawasaki Machine Systems Ltd. (South Korea)

==== Europe ====
- Kawasaki Precision Machinery (U.K.) Limited
- Kawasaki Robotics (U.K.) Ltd.
- Kawasaki Robotics G.m.b.H.
- Kawasaki Gas Turbine Europe GmbH
- Kawasaki Motors Europe N.V.
- Kawasaki Heavy Industries Europe Finance B.V.
- Kawasaki Heavy Industries (Europe) B.V.
- Italian Motorcycle Investment S.p.A.

==== North America ====
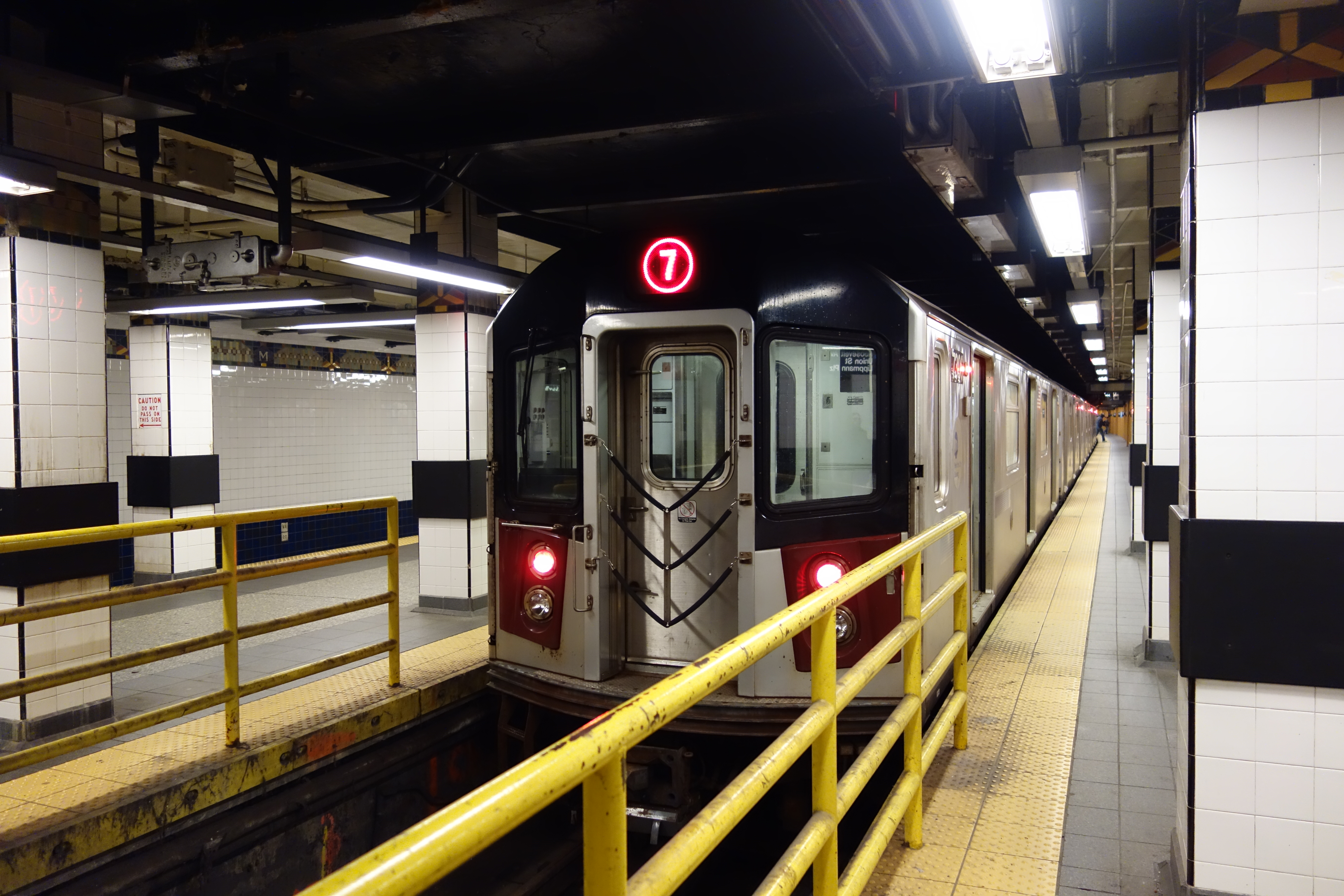
A train of Kawasaki R188 subway cars on the New York City Subway line

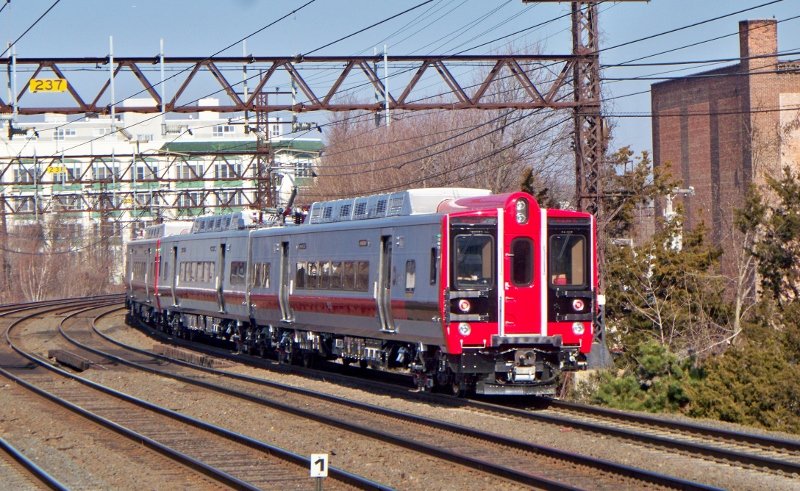
A set of Kawasaki's M8 railcars on the New Haven Line

- Canadian Kawasaki Motors Inc.
- Kawasaki Construction Machinery Corp. of America
- Kawasaki Heavy Industries (U.S.A.), Inc.
- Kawasaki Motors Corp., U.S.A.
- Kawasaki Motors Manufacturing Corp., U.S.A.
- Kawasaki Precision Machinery (U.S.A.), Inc.
- Kawasaki Rail Car, Inc.
- Kawasaki Robotics (U.S.A.), Inc.

==== Oceania ====
- Kawasaki Motors Pty. Ltd.

==== South America ====
- Kawasaki do Brasil Indústria e Comércio Ltda.
- Kawasaki Machinery do Brasil Maq. Equip. Ltda.
- Kawasaki Motores do Brasil Ltda.
- Estaleiro Enseada do Paraguaçu S.A.

==== South Asia ====
- India Kawasaki Motors (India)
- Kawasaki Motors (Bangladesh)

==== Southeast Asia ====
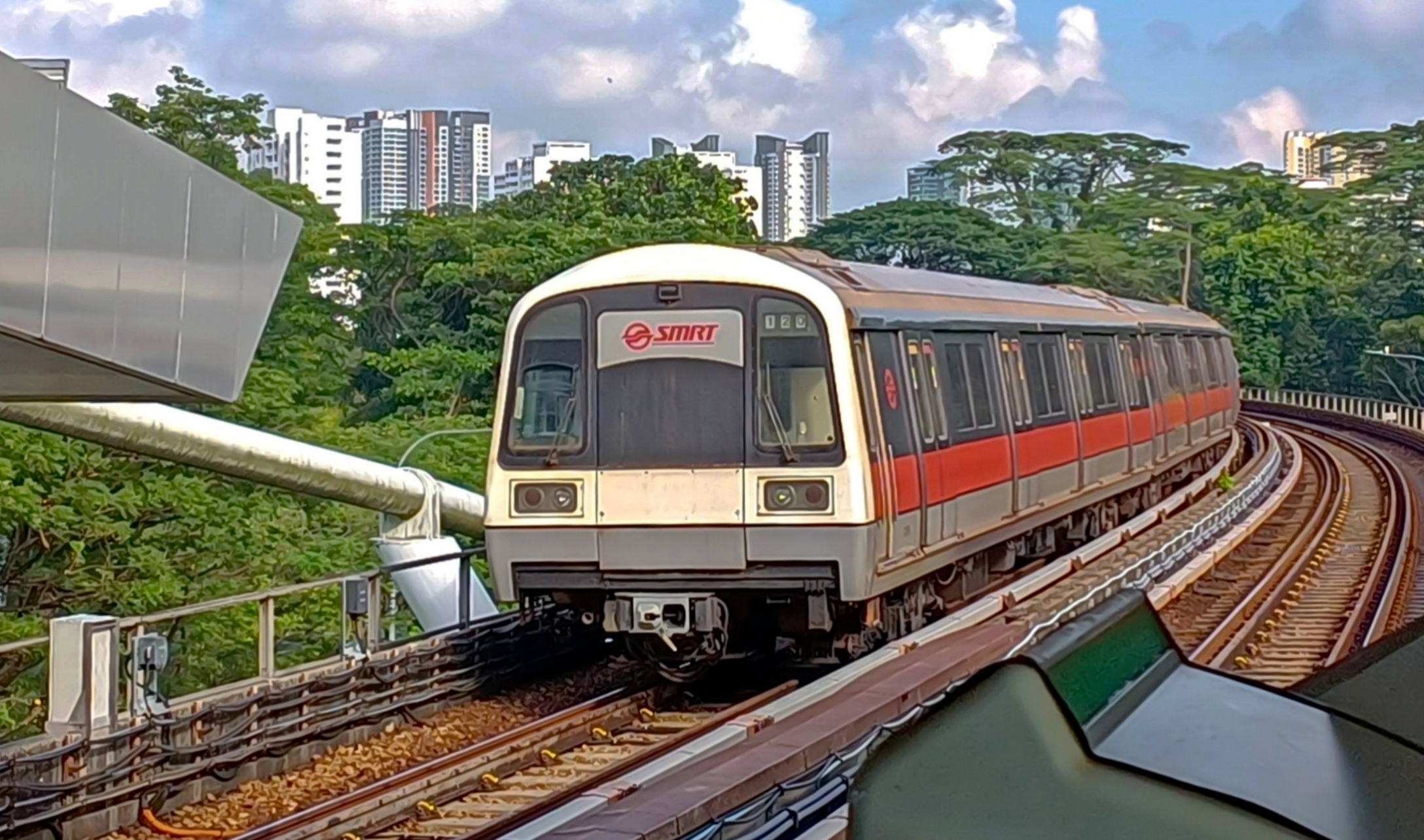
A Kawasaki C151 train on the Singapore MRT

- Kawasaki Gas Turbine Asia Sdn. Bhd. (Malaysia)
- Kawasaki Motors (Malaysia) Sdn. Bhd. (Malaysia)
- Kawasaki Heavy Industries Pte. Ltd. (Singapore)
- Kawasaki Motors Enterprise Co. Ltd. (Thailand)
- KDT (KHI Design & Technical Service, Inc. (Pasay, Philippines)
- Kawasaki Motors Philippines (Muntinlupa, Philippines)
- Kawasaki Motors (Indonesia)

==== Middle East ====
- Kawasaki-KSA. Saudi Arabia

== Controversies ==
=== Marine engine test data misconduct ===
In August 2024, Kawasaki Heavy Industries said it had deliberately manipulated test data of 674 ship engines built since 2000 and that such cheating had lasted for 20 years.

A report released on Aug. 29, 2025 said the investigative committee had informed Kawasaki of the possibility that fuel efficiency test data from Japan Maritime Self-Defense Forces' Soryu-class and Taigei-class submarines were tampered with after discovering alleged irregularities in engines manufactured before 2021 and later reported the issue to the Ministry of Defense. The company said it was not yet known when and how the misconduct occurred and that the investigative committee would continue its investigation and produce a final report by the end of the year.

== See also ==
- Kobe Shimbun - Founded by one of the owners of the company
