= Kawasaki line =

Kawasaki line may refer to:

- Kawasaki Kisen Kaisha (Japanese: 川崎汽船株式会社, romanized: Kawasaki Kisen Kabushiki-gaisha, lit. 'Kawasaki Steam Engine Company') a.k.a. K-Line, a private Japanese railroad line and operating company
- Kawasaki Municipal Subway (Japanese: 川崎縦貫高速鉄道, romanized: Kawasaki jūkan kōsoku tetsudō, lit. 'Kawasaki Longitudinal Rapid Railway'), a future subway line in Kawasaki, Kanagwa Prefecture, Japan
- Kawasaki City Tram (Japanese: 川崎市電, romanized: Kawasaki Shiden), a former tram line in Kawasaki, Kanagwa Prefecture, Japan

== See also ==
- Kawasaki Route (Japanese: 川崎線, romanized: Kawasaki-sen) a.k.a. Route K6, a toll road of the Shuto expressway system in Greater Tokyo
