= Kawasaki Shōzō =

Japanese industrialist and shipbuilder

Shōzō Kawasaki
- 川崎 正蔵
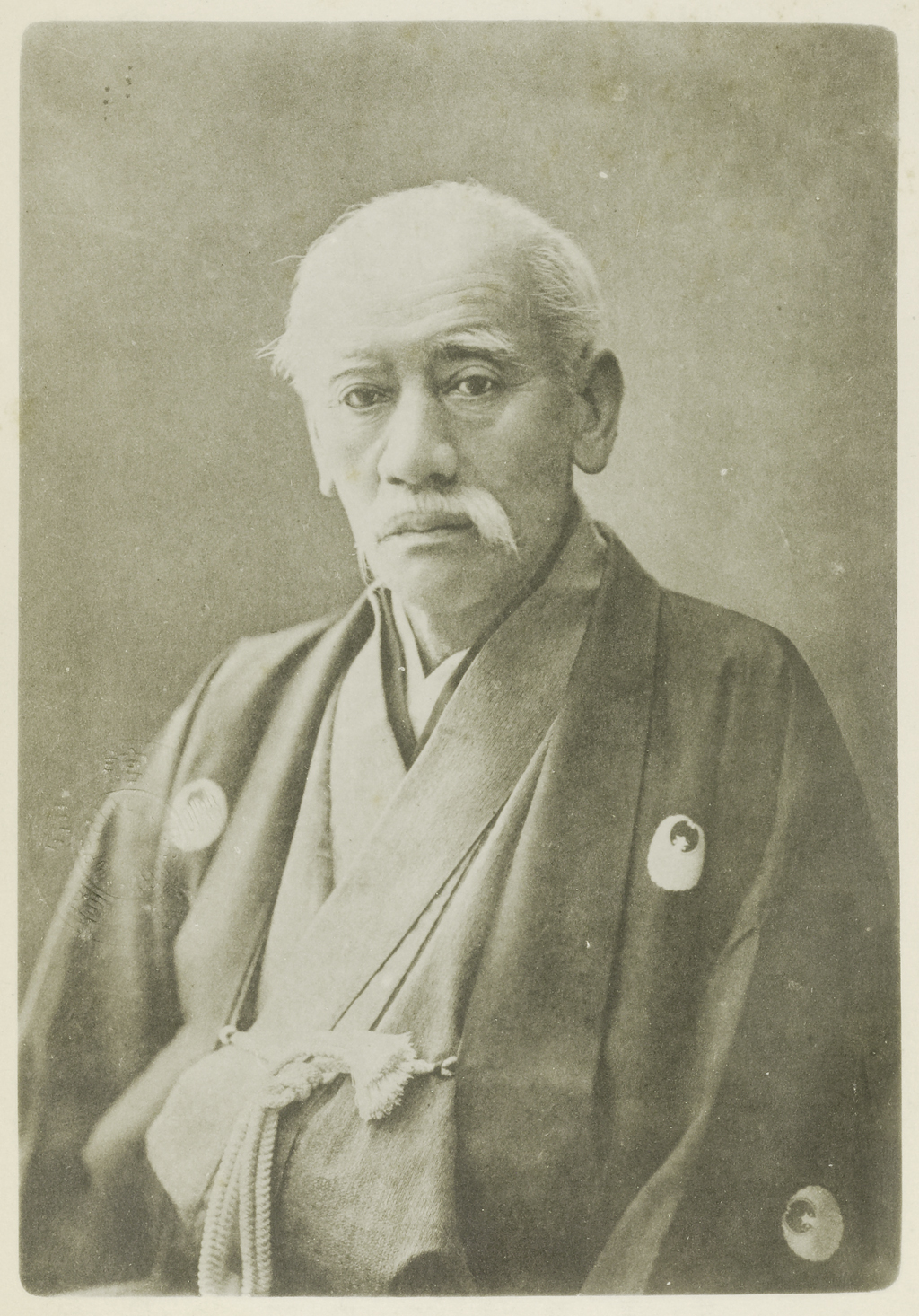

Member of the House of Peers
- In office 29 September 1890 – 2 December 1912 Nominated by the Emperor

Personal details
- Born: 2 December 1837 Daikoku, Satsuma, Japan
- Died: 2 December 1912 (aged 75) Tokyo, Japan
- Occupation: Industrialist, shipbuilder
- Known for: Founder of Kawasaki Heavy Industries

Shōzō Kawasaki (川崎 正蔵; 2 December 1837 – 2 December 1912) was a Japanese industrialist and shipbuilder. He was the founder of Kawasaki Heavy Industries.

== Biography ==
Born in Kagoshima to a kimono merchant, Shōzō Kawasaki became a tradesman at the age of 17 in Nagasaki, the only place in Japan then open to the West. He started a shipping business in Osaka at 27, which failed when his cargo ship sank during a storm. In 1869, he joined a company handling sugar from the Ryukyu Islands, established by a Kagoshima samurai, and in 1893, researched Ryukyu sugar and sea routes to the Ryukyus at the request of the Ministry of Finance. In 1894, he was appointed executive vice president of Japan Mail Steam-Powered Shipping Company, and succeeded in opening a sea route to the Ryukyu and transporting sugar to mainland Japan.

Having experienced many sea accidents in his life, Kawasaki deepened his trust in Western ships because they were more spacious, stable and faster than typical Japanese ships. At the same time, he became very interested in the modern shipbuilding industry. In April 1876, supported by Matsukata Masayoshi, the Vice Minister of Finance, who was from the same province as Kawasaki, he established Kawasaki Tsukiji Shipyard on borrowed land from the government alongside the Sumida-gawa River, Tsukiji Minami-Iizaka-chō (currently Tsukiji 7-chome, Chūō, Tokyo). This was a major step forward not only for the company but for Japan as a shipbuilder. It contributed in transitioning Japan from a feudal nation to an industrial giant.

Building on the success of his venture, Kawasaki then expanded his company with the construction of Hyogo Kawasaki Dockyard in 1880 at the Higashidemachi, Hyogo. By 1887, Kawasaki finally purchased the leased land at Tsukiji from the government and all of the yards under his control were incorporated.

Kawasaki Heavy Industries, Ltd. traces its origins to 1878, when Shōzō Kawasaki (川崎 正蔵) established Kawasaki Tsukiji Shipyard in Tokyo, Japan. Eighteen years later, in 1896, it was incorporated as Kawasaki Dockyard Co., Ltd.
