= E231 series =

Japanese train type

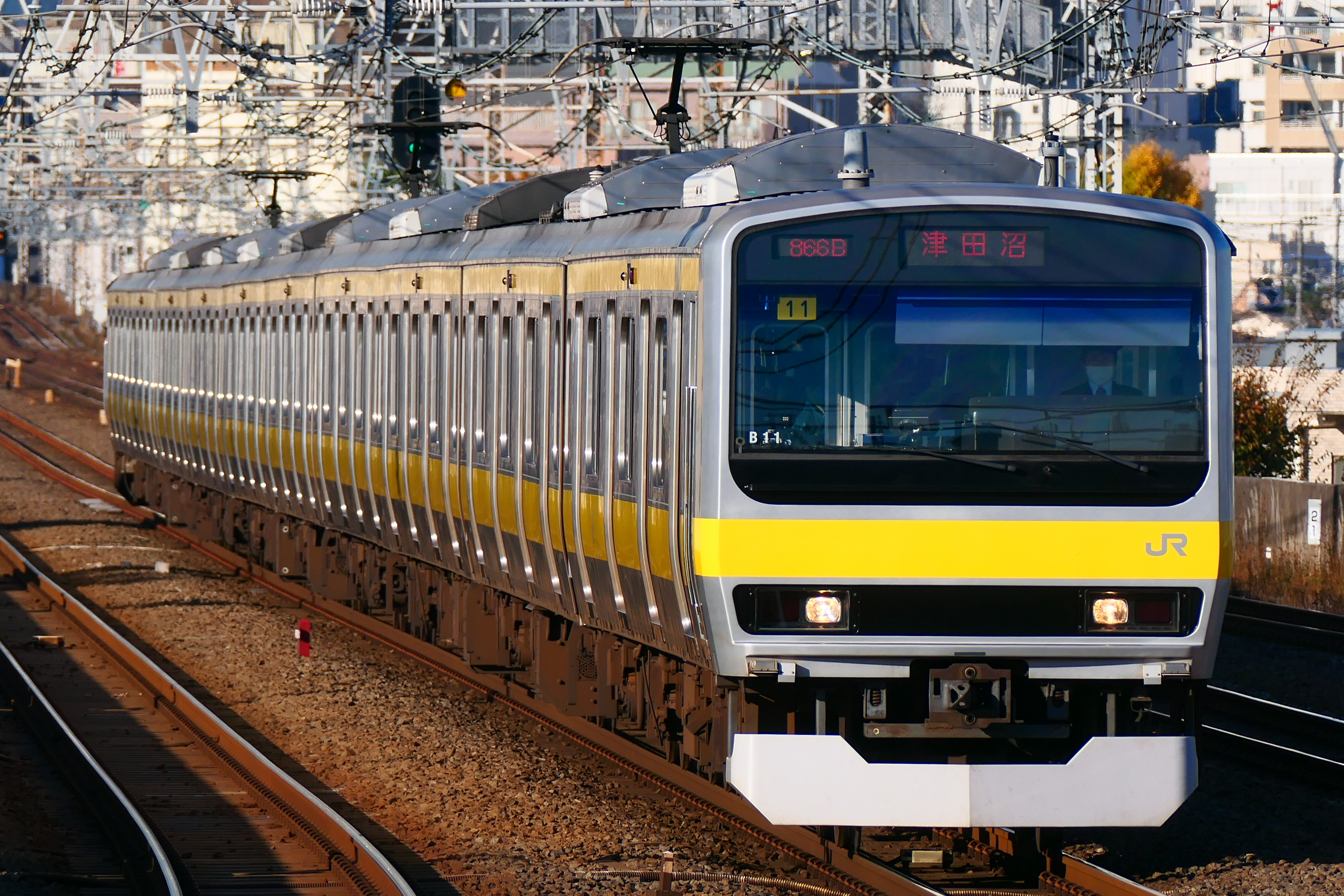
- A Chūō–Sōbu Line E231-0 series train in December 2022
- Manufacturers: JR East, Kawasaki Heavy Industries, Tokyu Car Corporation
- Built at: Niitsu, Kobe, Yokohama
- Replaced: 103 series, 113 series, 115 series, 201 series, 205 series, 301 series
- Constructed: 1998–2006; 2010–2011 (SaHa E231-600 & SaHa E231-4600 carriages)
- Entered service: 13 March 2000
- Refurbished: 2014–
- Scrapped: 2010–
- Number built: 2,736 vehicles
- Number in service: 2,476 vehicles (+48 vehicles converted to E235 series)
- Number scrapped: 212 vehicles
- Successor: E235 series (Yamanote Line & Chuo-Sobu Line [Future])
- Formation: 4/5/8/10 cars per trainset (Previously also 11)
- Operator: JR East
- Depots: Kawagoe, Keiyō, Kōzu, Matsudo, Mitaka, Oyama
- Line served: (See below)

Specifications
- Car body construction: Stainless steel
- Car length: 20,000 mm (65 ft 7 in)
- Width: 2,950 mm (9 ft 8 in)
- Doors: 4 pairs per side (previously also 6 pairs per side); 2 doors per side (Green cars)
- Maximum speed: 120 km/h (75 mph)
- Traction system: Mitsubishi 3-level IGBT-VVVF
- Acceleration: 2.5, 3, or 3.3 km/(h⋅s) (1.6, 1.9, or 2.1 mph/s)
- Deceleration: 4 km/(h⋅s) (2.5 mph/s) (service); 4.5 km/(h⋅s) (2.8 mph/s) (emergency)
- HVAC: AU725/AU726
- Electric systems: 1,500 V DC overhead line
- Current collection: Pantograph
- Bogies: DT61 (powered), TR246 (trailer)
- Braking systems: Regenerative brake, electronically controlled pneumatic brakes
- Safety systems: ATS-P, ATS-SN, D-ATC
- Coupling system: Shibata type
- Multiple working: E233-3000 series (for E231-1000 series only)
- Track gauge: 1,067 mm (3 ft 6 in)

The E231 series (E231系, E231-kei) is a Japanese electric multiple unit (EMU) train type in service since 2000. It replaced aging rolling stock that were used for commuter and outer-suburban services operated by East Japan Railway Company (JR East). Over 2,000 vehicles were built from 1998 to 2006, and again from 2010 to 2011.

== Design ==
Trains were manufactured by Tokyu Car Corporation, Kawasaki Heavy Industries and also at JR East's factory at Niitsu in Niigata Prefecture.

The type evolved from the earlier 209 series and E217 series EMUs, with the main visible difference being wider bodies (2,950 mm (9 ft 8 in) compared to the 2,800 mm (9 ft 2 in) for earlier commuter trains), and the prototype train built in 1998 for trials on the Chūō–Sōbu Line was actually classified 209-950 series, later becoming E231-900 series. Full-production E231-0 series trains were subsequently introduced on the Chūō–Sōbu Line (10-car sets) and Jōban Line (10+5-car sets). Other variants include the 11-car E231-500 series for the Yamanote Line, and the E231-800 series with 2,800 mm (9 ft 2 in) wide bodies and end doors for use on Tokyo Metro Tozai Line inter-running services.

From 2000 onwards, the first E231-1000 series outer-suburban variant was delivered for use on Utsunomiya Line and Takasaki Line services north from Ueno Station in Tokyo. These trains included transverse seating in some cars and were also equipped with toilets. Production continued into 2006 with trains delivered for use on the Tōkaidō Main Line south from Tokyo. From 2004 onwards, two bilevel Green cars were inserted into all E231-1000 series ten-car sets.

== Variants ==
- / / E231-0 series: 5-car, 8-car, and 10-car sets used on the Chūō–Sōbu Line, Jōban Line, Narita Line, Musashino Line, and Keiyō Line
- E231-500 series: 10-car sets used on the Chūō–Sōbu Line (Soon Being Replaced by a new E235 series)
- E231-800 series: 10-car sets used on Chūō–Sōbu Line and Tokyo Metro Tozai Line inter-running services
- E231-900 series: 8-car set used on the Musashino Line and Keiyō Line
- E231-1000 series: 5-car and 10-car suburban sets used on the Tōkaidō Main Line, Utsunomiya Line, and Takasaki Line, and on Ueno–Tokyo Line and Shōnan–Shinjuku Line through services
- E231-3000 series: 4-car sets converted from former E231-0 series sets for use on the Kawagoe Line and Hachikō Line

=== Former operations ===
- E231-500 series: 11-car sets used on the Yamanote Line from 21 April 2002 until 20 January 2020
- E231-900 series: 10-car set used on the Chūō–Sōbu Line from December 1998 until 25 February 2020 (designated as 209-950 series until June 2000)

== E231-0 series ==
E231-0 series
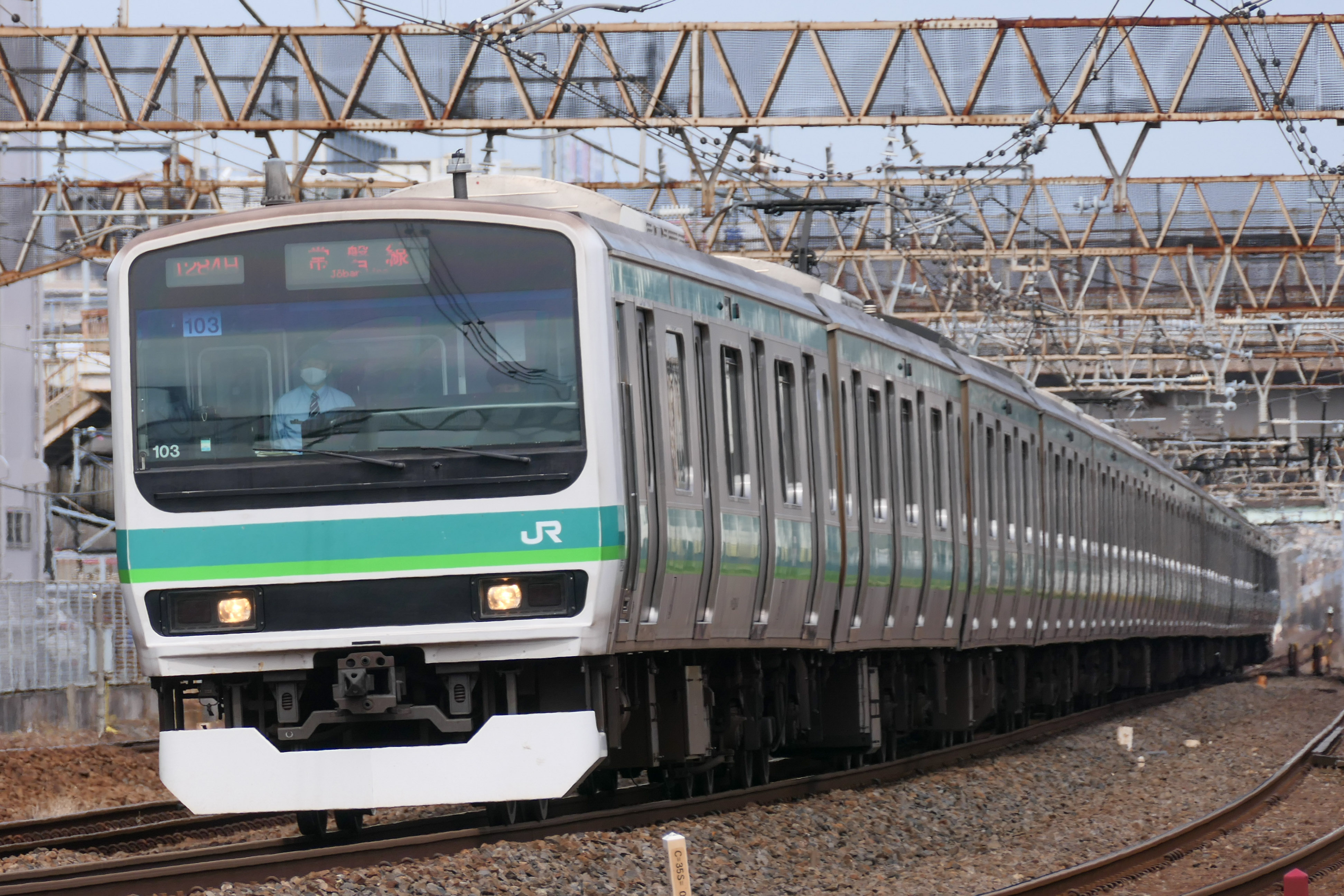
- A Jōban Line 10+5 car set in March 2021
- Replaced: 103 series, 103-1000 series, 201 series, 205 series, 205-5000 series
- Constructed: 2000–2006
- Entered service: 13 March 2000
- Refurbished: 2014–2020
- Number built: 725 vehicles
- Number in service: 599 vehicles (76 sets) (+24 vehicles converted to E231-3000 series)
- Number scrapped: 102 vehicles
- Formation: 5/8/10 cars per trainset
- Operator: JR East
- Depots: Keiyō, Matsudo, Mitaka; Previously: Narashino
- Lines served: Chūō–Sōbu Line; Jōban Line; Keiyō Line; Musashino Line; ■ Narita Line (Abiko Branch); Tōkaidō Line; ■ Ueno–Tokyo Line

Specifications
- Car body construction: Stainless steel
- Width: 2.95 m (9 ft 8 in)
- Doors: 4 pairs per side (previously also 6 pairs per side)
- Traction system: Variable frequency (Mitsubishi IGBT-VVVF)
- Traction motors: MT73
- Power output: 95kW Per Motor
- Transmission: Gear Ratio: 14:99=1:7.07
- Electric system: 1,500 V DC overhead catenary
- Current collection: PS33B pantograph
- Track gauge: 1,067 mm (3 ft 6 in)

The first full-production E231-0 series trains were introduced on the Chūō–Sōbu Line between February 2000 and November 2001, with 21 ten-car sets (101–121) based at Narashino Depot in Chiba and 21 ten-car sets (20–25, 28–42) based at Mitaka Depot in Tokyo. They replaced older 103, 201, and 205 series trains. One more ten-car set (57) was delivered to Mitaka Depot in November 2002. In December 2003, all Narashino sets were transferred to Mitaka Depot and renumbered 1–19, 26, and 27. Between October and November 2006, three more sets (80–82) were built to replace three 209-500 series sets transferred to the Keihin–Tōhoku—Negishi Line, creating a total fleet of 46 trains. The Chūō–Sōbu Line sets each contained a six-door car.

New built E231-0 series sets were also delivered to Matsudo Depot between November 2001 and February 2005 for use on Jōban Line services between Ueno and Toride, and also Narita Line services to Narita, replacing the earlier 103 series fleet. A total of 17 ten-car sets (101–117) and 19 five-car sets (121–139) were built.

From December 2009 to November 2011, set 27 was temporarily transferred to Tokyo General Rolling Stock Center and used to deliver new SaHa E231-600 and SaHa E231-4600 trailer cars for the Yamanote Line. In 2012, a "B" suffix was added to all Chūō–Sōbu Line sets (B1–B42, B57, and B80–B82).

=== Refurbishment ===
Between 2015 and 2020, all E231-0 series sets underwent a mid-life refurbishment with new equipment. In addition, with the transfer of former Yamanote Line E231-500 series sets to the Chūō–Sōbu Line and to prepare for the installation of platform doors, 40 trains were transferred from the Chūō–Sōbu Line to other lines, while six trains were reformed and remain on the Chūō–Sōbu Line with all six-door cars replaced with excess four-door cars from the other 40 sets.

In late 2014 and early 2015, two Chūō–Sōbu Line sets (B20 and B21, with six-door cars substituted by two trailer cars from B22) were transferred to the Jōban Line (and renumbered 118 and 119) for the extension of the Jōban Line services to Shinagawa Station with the opening of the Ueno–Tokyo Line. This brought the total number of Jōban Line sets to 38 (19 five-car and 19 ten-car sets), all of which were refurbished between 2015 and 2020.

From October 2017 to September 2020, 32 Chūō–Sōbu Line sets were refurbished, shortened to eight cars, and transferred to the Musashino Line (and renumbered MU2–MU21, MU31–MU39, and MU41–MU43) to replace older 205 series and 205-5000 series sets; the first set (MU2) entered service in November 2017.

From November 2017 to October 2019, six Chūō–Sōbu Line sets were refurbished, shortened to four cars, redesignated as E231-3000 series, and transferred to the Hachikō Line and Kawagoe Line.

The first reformed E231-0 series Chūō–Sōbu Line train (with 6 motored cars and no six-door car), numbered set B11 and composed of 8 cars of former set B11 and 2 cars of former set B5, completed refurbishment on 24 April 2018 and reentered into service on 21 May 2018. A total of six reformed ten-car trains remain on the Chūō–Sōbu Line. The last non-reformed trains (with 4 motored cars and a six-door car), sets B80 and B82, were removed from service after 13 March 2020.

==== Transfers from Chūō–Sōbu Line ====
Chūō–Sōbu Line transfers and reformations (standard pattern)
Old Chūō–Sōbu 4M6T sets	x41	Car 1 KuHa E231	Car 2 SaHa E231	Car 3 MoHa E231	Car 4 MoHa E230	Car 5 SaHa E230	Car 6 SaHa E231	Car 7 SaHa E231	Car 8 MoHa E231	Car 9 MoHa E230	Car 10; KuHa E230
Type		cab + trailer	trailer	motored pair		trailer 6-door	trailer	trailer	motored pair		trailer + cab
New Chūō–Sōbu 6M4T sets	x5	Car 1	X	Car 2	Car 3	X	Car 4	Car 7	Car 8	Car 9	Car 10
Hachikō/Kawagoe -3000 series sets	x5	Car 4	X	Chūō–Sōbu; Car 5	Chūō–Sōbu; Car 6	X	X	X	Car 3	Car 2	Car 1
Musashino sets	x31	Car 1	X	Car 2	Car 3	X	Car 4	Car 5	Car 6	Car 7	Car 8

Chūō–Sōbu Line transfers and reformations (non-standard pattern)
Old Chūō–Sōbu 4M6T sets	Car 1 KuHa E231	Car 2 SaHa E231	Car 3 MoHa E231	Car 4 MoHa E230	Car 5 SaHa E230	Car 6 SaHa E231	Car 7 SaHa E231	Car 8 MoHa E231	Car 9 MoHa E230	Car 10; KuHa E230
Type	cab + trailer	trailer	motored pair		trailer 6-door	trailer	trailer	motored pair		trailer + cab
Former B5	Hae 41; Car 4	X	Mitsu B11; Car 5	Mitsu B11; Car 6	X	Keyo MU2; Car 4	X	Hae 41; Car 3	Hae 41; Car 2	Hae 41; Car 1
Former B11	Mitsu B11; Car 1	X	Mitsu B11; Car 2	Mitsu B11; Car 3	X	Mitsu B11; Car 4	Mitsu B11; Car 7	Mitsu B11; Car 8	Mitsu B11; Car 9	Mitsu B11; Car 10
Former B20	Mato 118; Car 10	Mato 118; Car 9	Mato 118; Car 8	Mato 118; Car 7	X	Mato 118; Car 5	Mato 118; Car 4	Mato 118; Car 3	Mato 118; Car 2	Mato 118; Car 1
Former B20	↓	↓	↓	↓	X	↓	↓	↓	↓	↓
Former B20	Keyo MU22; Car 1	X	Keyo MU22; Car 2	Keyo MU22; Car 3	X	Keyo MU22; Car 5	X	Keyo MU22; Car 6	Keyo MU22; Car 7	Keyo MU22; Car 8
Former B21	Mato 119; Car 10	Mato 119; Car 9	Mato 119; Car 8	Mato 119; Car 7	X	Mato 119; Car 5	Mato 119; Car 4	Mato 119; Car 3	Mato 119; Car 2	Mato 119; Car 1
Former B22	Keyo MU2; Car 1	Keyo MU2; Car 5	Keyo MU2; Car 2	Keyo MU2; Car 3	X	Mato 118; Car 6	Mato 119; Car 6	Keyo MU2; Car 6	Keyo MU2; Car 7	Keyo MU2; Car 8
Former B22	Keyo MU2; Car 1	Keyo MU2; Car 5	Keyo MU2; Car 2	Keyo MU2; Car 3	X	↓	Mato 119; Car 6	Keyo MU2; Car 6	Keyo MU2; Car 7	Keyo MU2; Car 8
Former B22	Keyo MU2; Car 1	Keyo MU2; Car 5	Keyo MU2; Car 2	Keyo MU2; Car 3	X	Keyo MU22; Car 4	Mato 119; Car 6	Keyo MU2; Car 6	Keyo MU2; Car 7	Keyo MU2; Car 8

=== Lines served ===
- Chūō–Sōbu Line
- Jōban Line (Rapid) (Toride – Ueno), Ueno–Tokyo Line, Tōkaidō Line (Tokyo – Shinagawa) and Narita Line (Abiko – Narita)
- Musashino Line, Keiyō Line (also Musashino and Shimōsa)

=== Formations ===
==== 10-car Chūō–Sōbu Line 6M4T sets (since 2018) ====
As of 19 March 2020, six ten-car sets (B10–B12, B14, B26, B27) are based at Mitaka depot in Tokyo and formed as shown below with six motored ("M") cars and four non-powered trailer ("T") cars.

	← Chiba Mitaka →									
Car No.	1	2	3	4	5	6	7	8	9	10
Designation	Tc	M	M'	T	M	M'	T	M	M'	Tc'
Numbering	KuHa E231	MoHa E231	MoHa E230	SaHa E231	MoHa E231	MoHa E230	SaHa E231	MoHa E231	MoHa E230	KuHa E230

- Cars 2, 5, and 8 each have one PS33B single-arm pantograph.
- Cars 1 and 10 have a wheelchair space.
- Car 4 is designated as a mildly air-conditioned car.

==== 10-car Jōban Line sets ====
As of 17 August 2020, 18 ten-car sets (101–117, 119) are based at Matsudo depot in Chiba Prefecture and formed as shown below with four motored ("M") cars and six non-powered trailer ("T") cars.

	← Narita, Toride Ueno, Shinagawa →									
Car No.	10	9	8	7	6	5	4	3	2	1
Designation	Tc	T	M	M'	T			M	M'	Tc'
Numbering	KuHa E231	SaHa E231	MoHa E231	MoHa E230	SaHa E231			MoHa E231	MoHa E230	KuHa E230

- Cars 3 and 8 each have one PS33B single-arm pantograph.
- Cars 1 and 10 have a wheelchair space.
- Car 8 is designated as a mildly air-conditioned car.

==== 5-car Jōban Line sets ====
As of 1 October 2018, 19 five-car sets (121–139) are based at Matsudo depot in Chiba Prefecture and formed as shown below with two motored ("M") cars and three non-powered trailer ("T") cars.

	← Narita, Toride Ueno, Shinagawa →				
Car No.	15	14	13	12	11
Designation	Tc	T	M	M'	Tc'
Numbering	KuHa E231	SaHa E231	MoHa E231	MoHa E230	KuHa E230

- Car 13 has one PS33B single-arm pantograph.
- Cars 11 and 15 have a wheelchair space.
- Car 14 is designated as a mildly air-conditioned car.

==== 8-car Musashino Line sets ====
As of 12 October 2020, 33 eight-car sets (MU2–MU22, MU31–MU39, MU41–MU43) are based at Keiyō Depot and formed as shown below with four motored ("M") cars and four non-powered trailer ("T") cars.

	← Tokyo, Kaihinmakuhari, Nishi-Funabashi Fuchūhommachi →							
Car No.	1	2	3	4	5	6	7	8
Designation	Tc	M	M'	T		M	M'	Tc'
Numbering	KuHa E231	MoHa E231	MoHa E230	SaHa E231		MoHa E231	MoHa E230	KuHa E230

- Cars 2 and 6 each have one PS33B single-arm pantograph.
- Cars 1 and 8 have a wheelchair space.
- Car 4 is designated as a mildly air-conditioned car.

=== Previous formations ===
==== 10-car Chūō–Sōbu Line 4M6T sets (2002 to 2020) ====
	← Chiba, Tsudanuma Nakano, Mitaka →									
Car No.	1	2	3	4	5	6	7	8	9	10
Designation	Tc	T	M	M'	T'	T		M	M'	Tc'
Numbering	KuHa E231	SaHa E231	MoHa E231	MoHa E230	SaHa E230	SaHa E231		MoHa E231	MoHa E230	KuHa E230

- Cars 3 and 8 each had one PS33B single-arm pantograph.
- Car 5 had six pairs of doors per side.
- Cars 1 and 10 had a wheelchair space.
- Car 4 was designated as a mildly air-conditioned car.
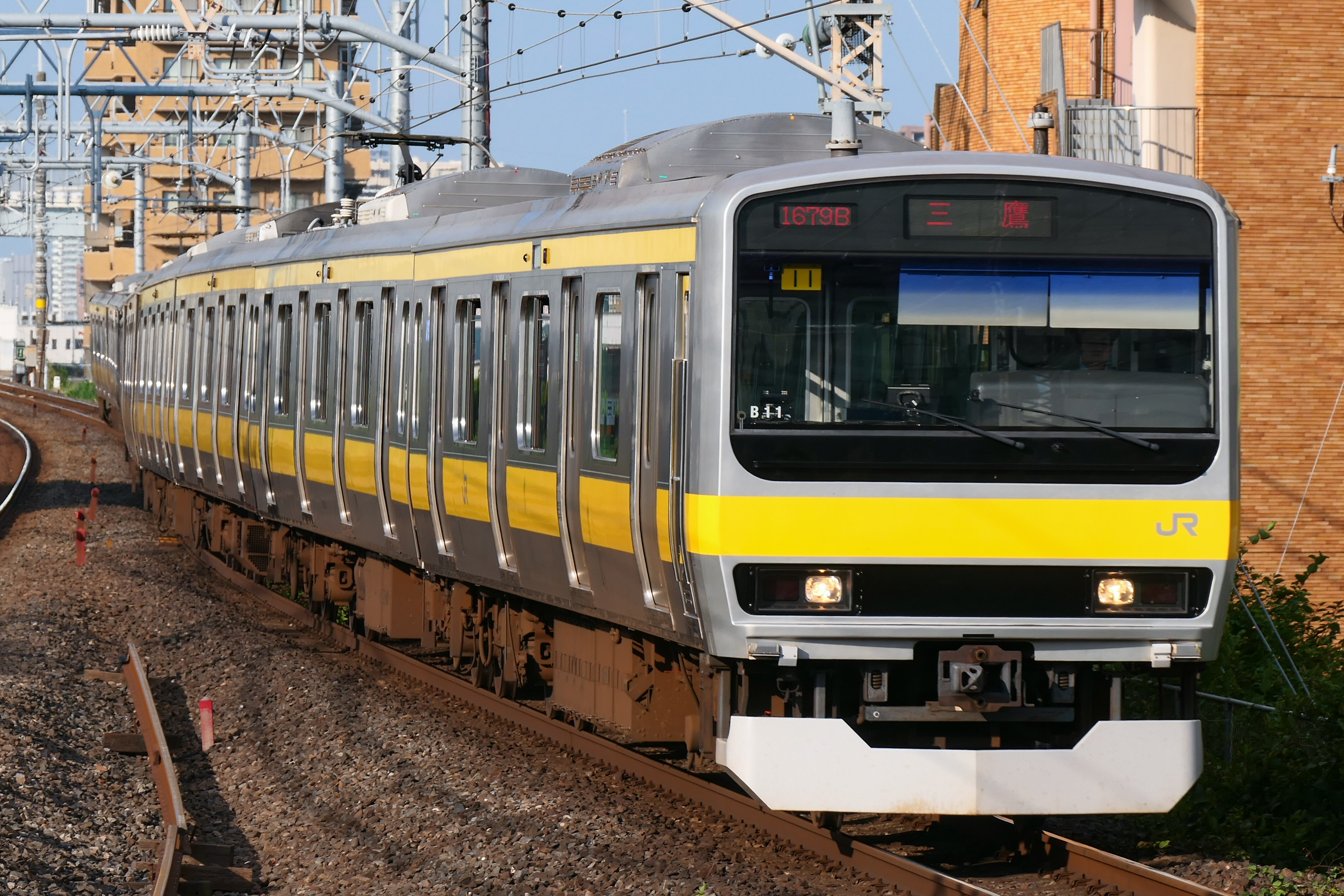
A Chūō–Sōbu Line 10-car E231-0 series set in August 2022

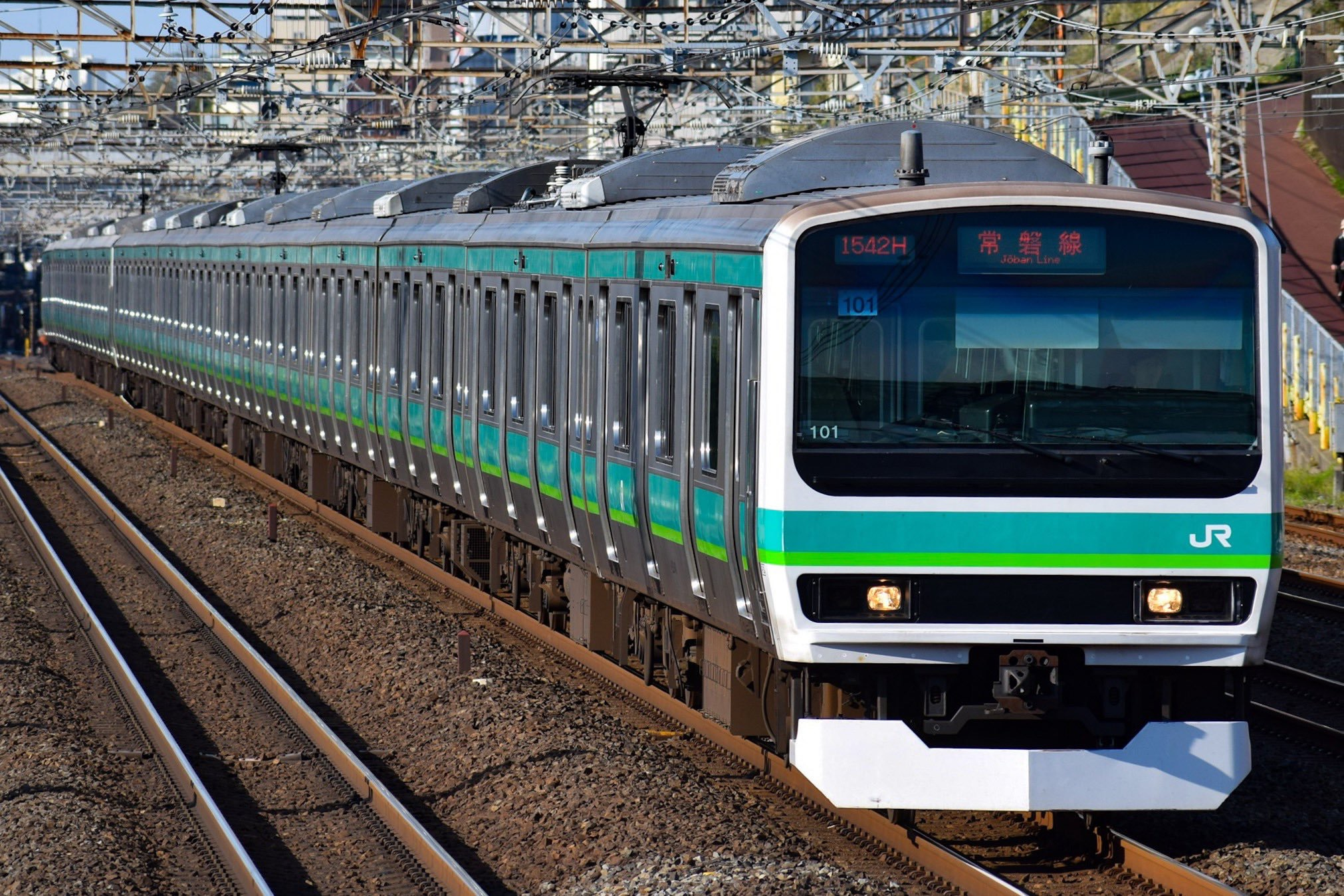
A Jōban Line 10+5-car E231-0 series formation in July 2008

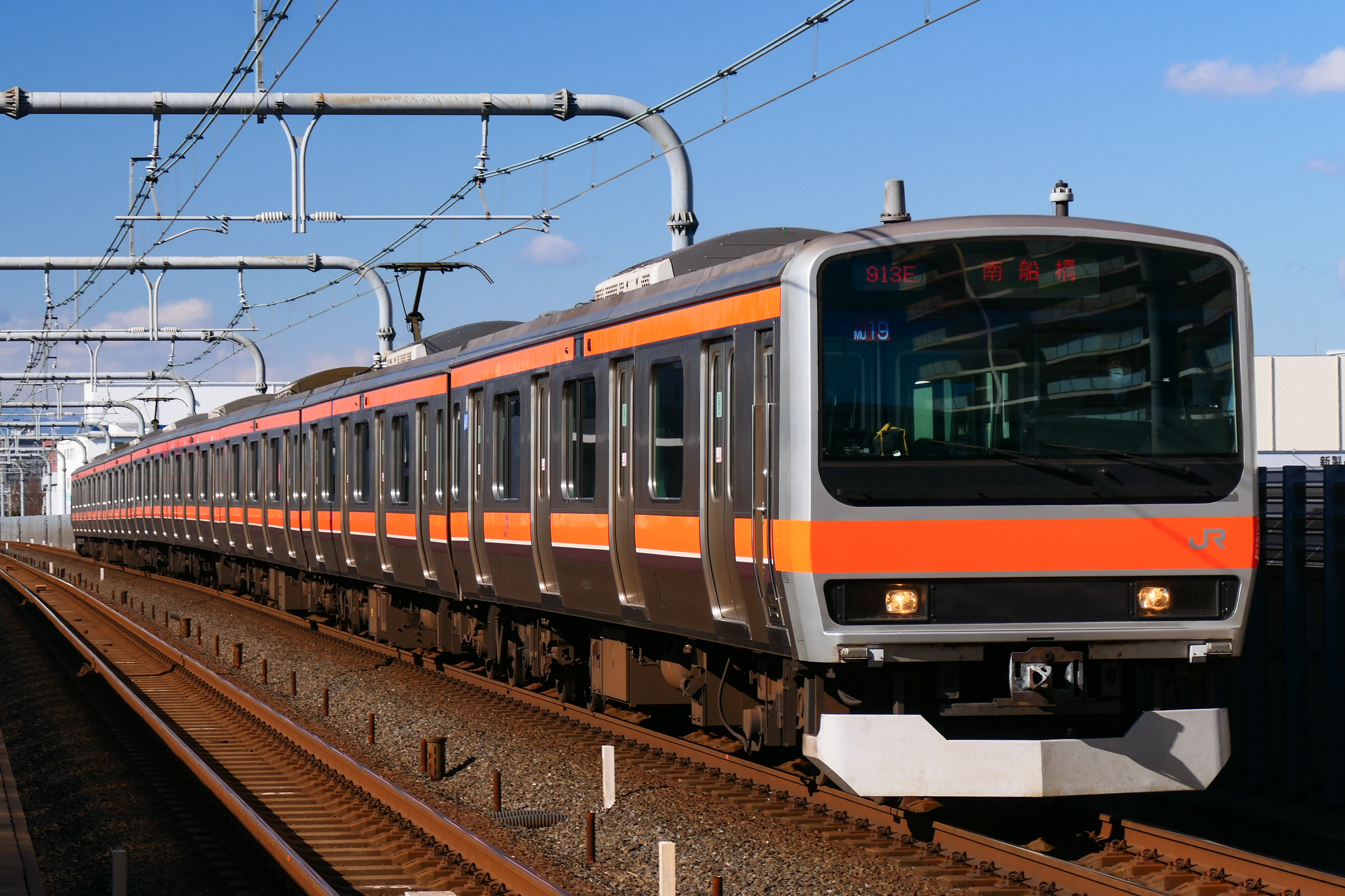
Musashino Line 8-car E231-0 series set MU19 in January 2023

=== Interior ===
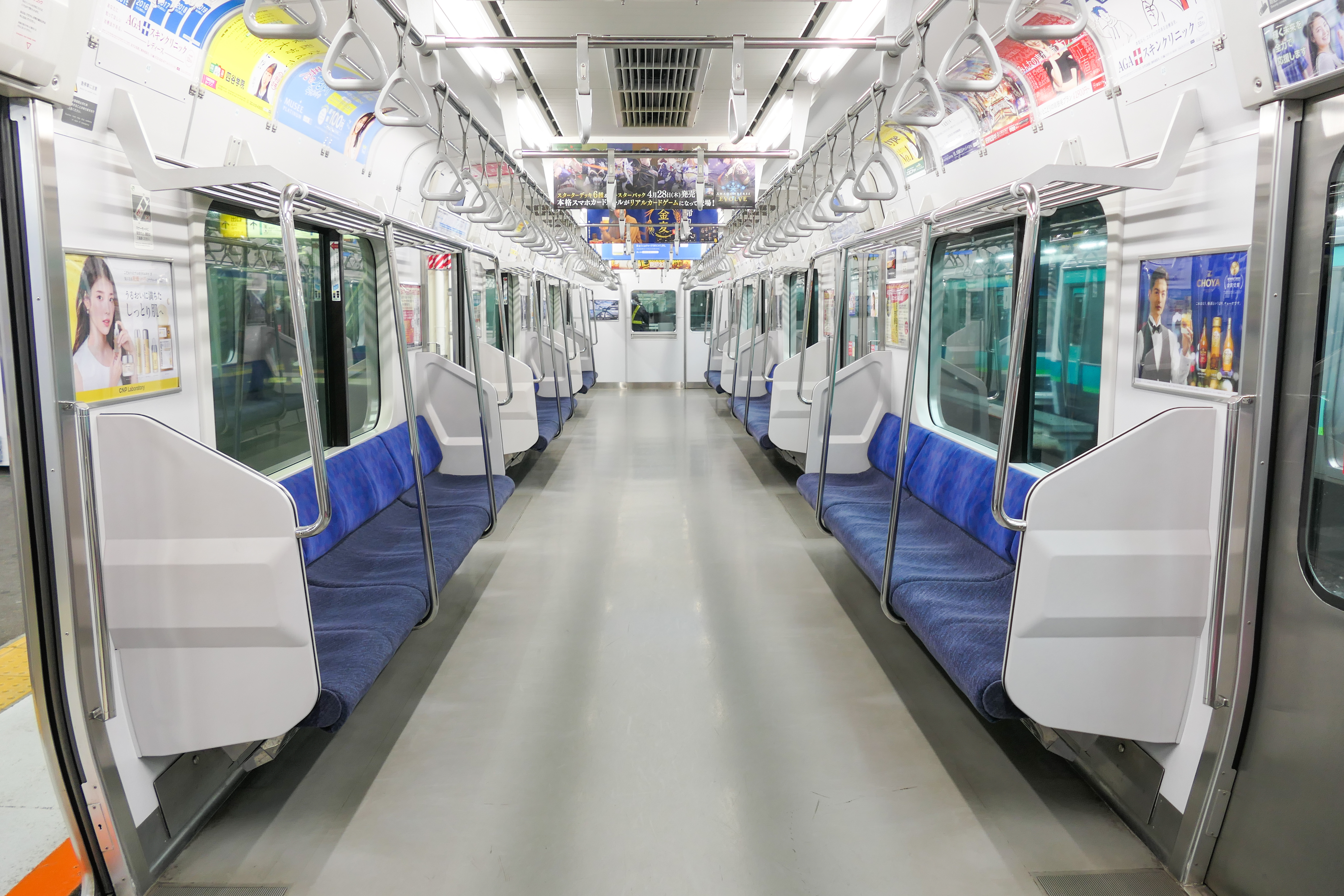
Interior view of KuHa E231-71 car

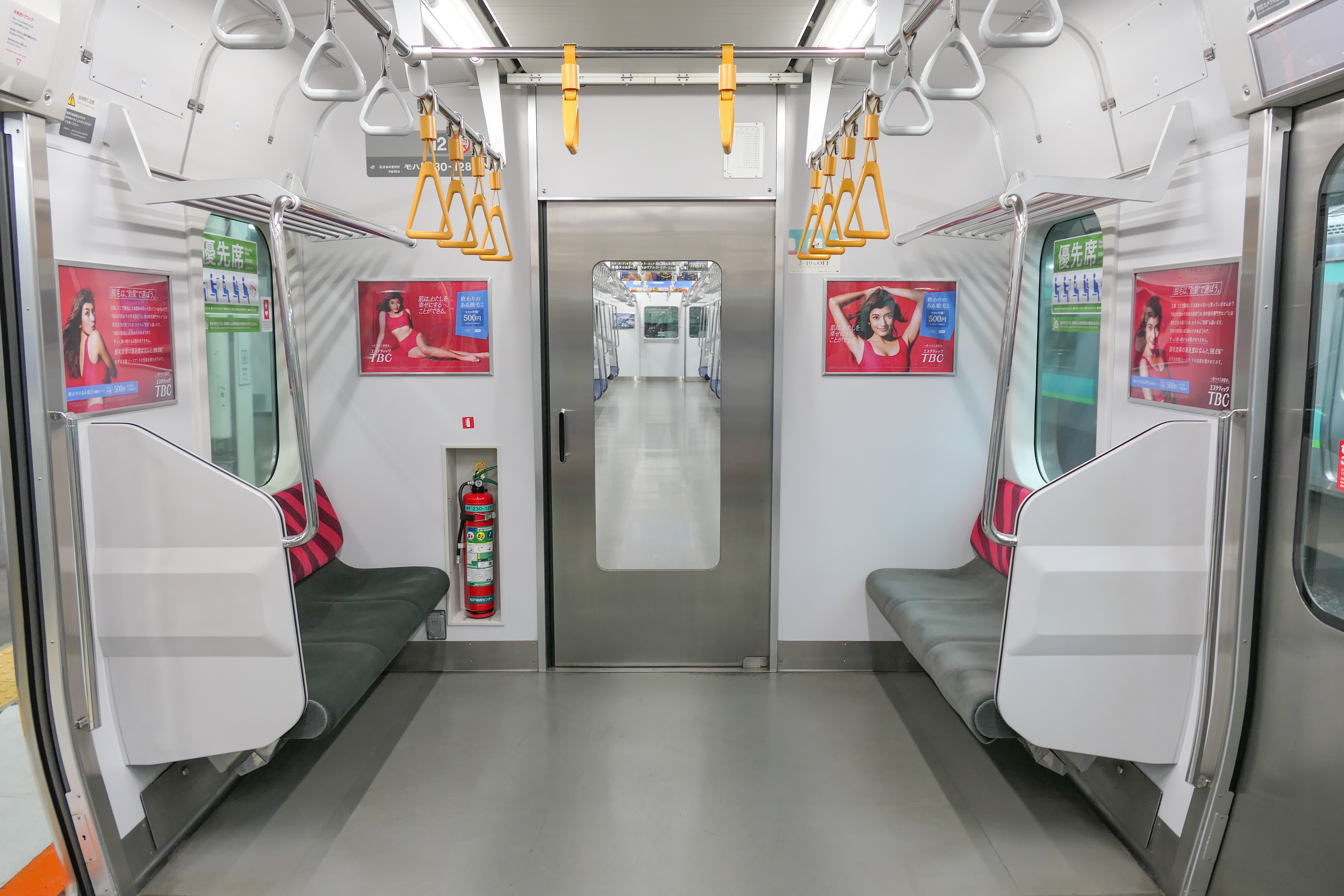
Priority seating of Moha E230-128 car

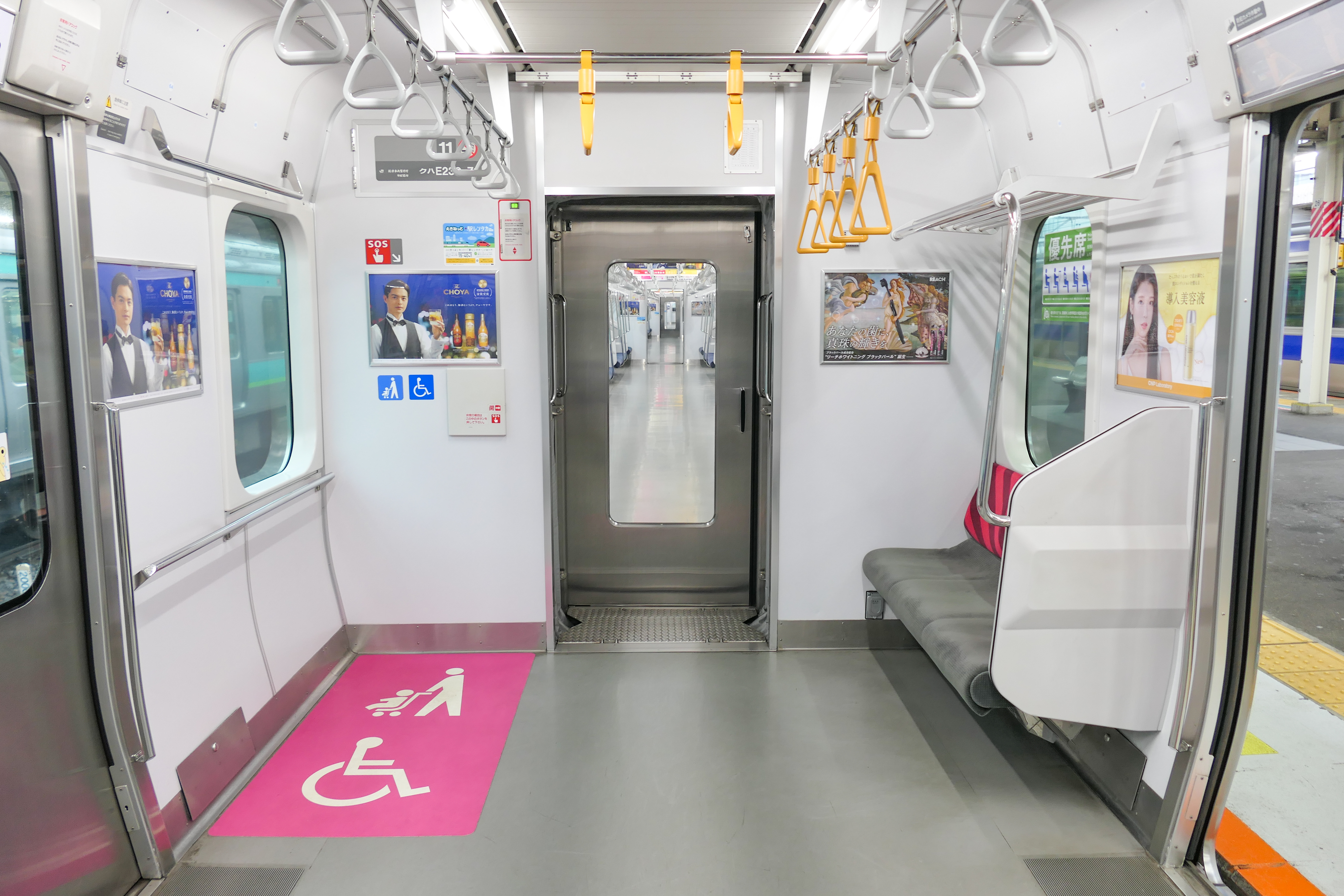
Wheelchair and stroller space of Kuha E230-71 car

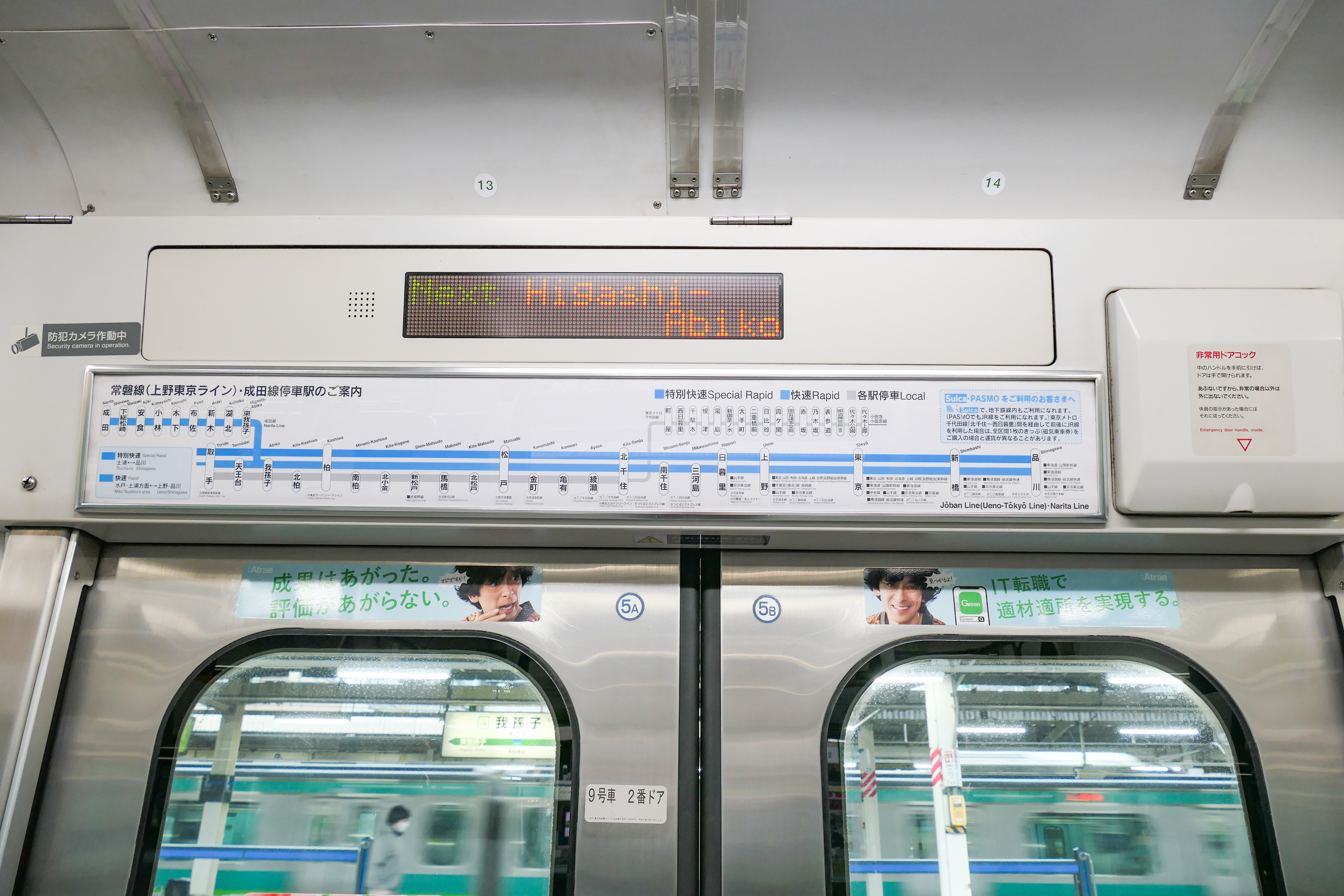
Passenger information screen

=== Special liveries ===
In April 2021, to commemorate the 120th anniversary of the Abiko Branch Line, JR East recolored set 139 into Sōbu/Yokosuka Line blue and cream stripes. Initially, only the cab ends received the commemorative stripes; however, these stripes were later extended to the rest of the train's body. The trainset was painted back into its original livery in late October.

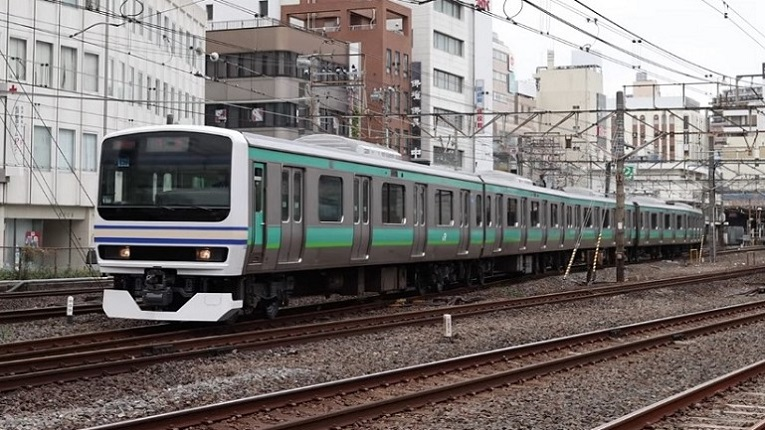
Set 139 with the cab front in Sōbu/Yokosuka Line color, April 2021

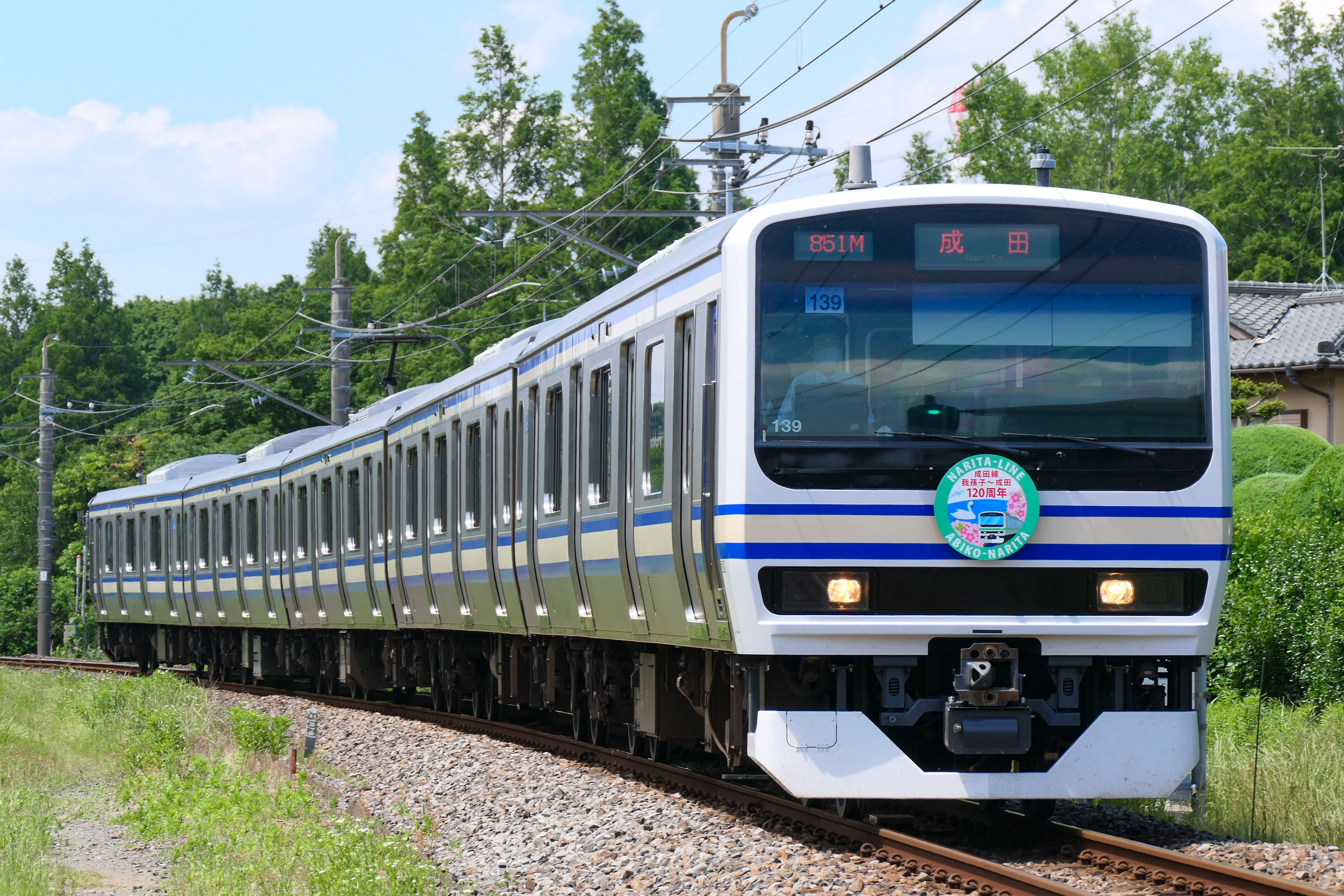
Set 139 in complete Sōbu/Yokosuka Line livery in May 2021

== E231-500 series ==
E231-500 series
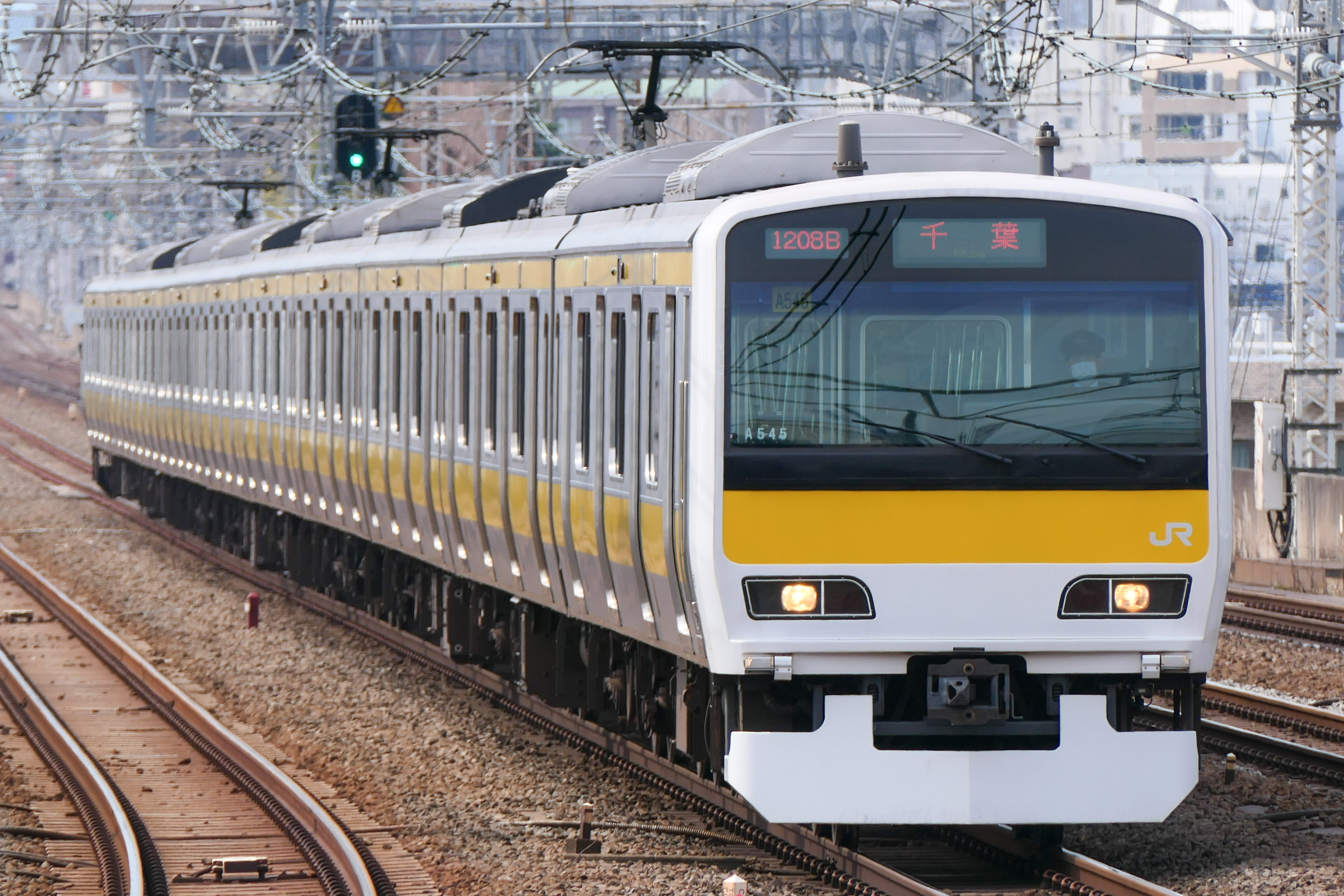
- Chūō–Sōbu Line 10-car E231-500 series set A545 in March 2021
- Replaced: 205 series, 209-500 series, E231-0 series
- Constructed: 2002–2005, 2010–2011 (SaHa E231-600, SaHa E231-4600)
- Entered service: 21 April 2002
- Refurbished: 2014–2020
- Scrapped: 2010–2011 (SaHa E230-500 x104); 2020 (SaHa E231-4600 x4)
- Number built: 676 vehicles
- Number in service: 520 vehicles (52 sets) (+48 vehicles converted to E235 series)
- Number scrapped: 108 vehicles
- Successor: E235-0 series (Yamanote Line)
- Formation: 10 (previously 11) cars per trainset
- Fleet numbers: A501–A552; Previously: 501-552
- Operator: JR East
- Depots: Mitaka; Previously: Tokyo
- Lines served: Chūō–Sōbu Line; Previously: Yamanote Line

Specifications
- Car body construction: Stainless steel
- Width: 2,950 mm (9 ft 8 in)
- Doors: 4 pairs per side (previously also 6 pairs per side)
- Electric system: 1,500 V DC overhead catenary
- Current collection: PS33B pantograph
- Track gauge: 1,067 mm (3 ft 6 in)

A fleet of 52 11-car E231-500 series was delivered from January 2002 to April 2005 for use on Yamanote Line services, replacing the earlier 205 series fleet. The first trains entered service on 21 April 2002. These trains include digital automatic train control (D-ATC), and feature pairs of LCD passenger information screens above each door internally. These screens also show advertisements. Each 11-car set originally contained two six-door SaHa E230 trailer cars (cars 7 and 10) with six pairs of doors per side and bench seats that were folded up until 10 a.m. on weekdays to provide standing room only during the morning peak. From 22 February 2010, the seats were able to be used during the morning peak.

=== SaHa E231-600/-4600 series cars ===
To standardize door spacing ahead of the introduction of platform doors on all Yamanote Line stations by 2017, the two six-door cars in each set were subsequently replaced by a new build of four-door trailer cars between February 2010 and August 2011, the first of which were delivered from JR East's Niitsu factory on 1 February 2010.

The new SaHa E231-600 cars (new car 7) incorporated some elements from the newer E233 series (most notably seats and handrails). The new SaHa E231-4600 cars (new car 10) were built almost fully to E233 series standards; they also have an irregular door spacing corresponding to the driving cars of Keihin–Tōhoku Line E233-1000 series sets, which occasionally have to share the same platforms during engineering work. This results in interior seating arranged 3-7-7-5-4, instead of the normal 3-7-7-7-3 arrangement.

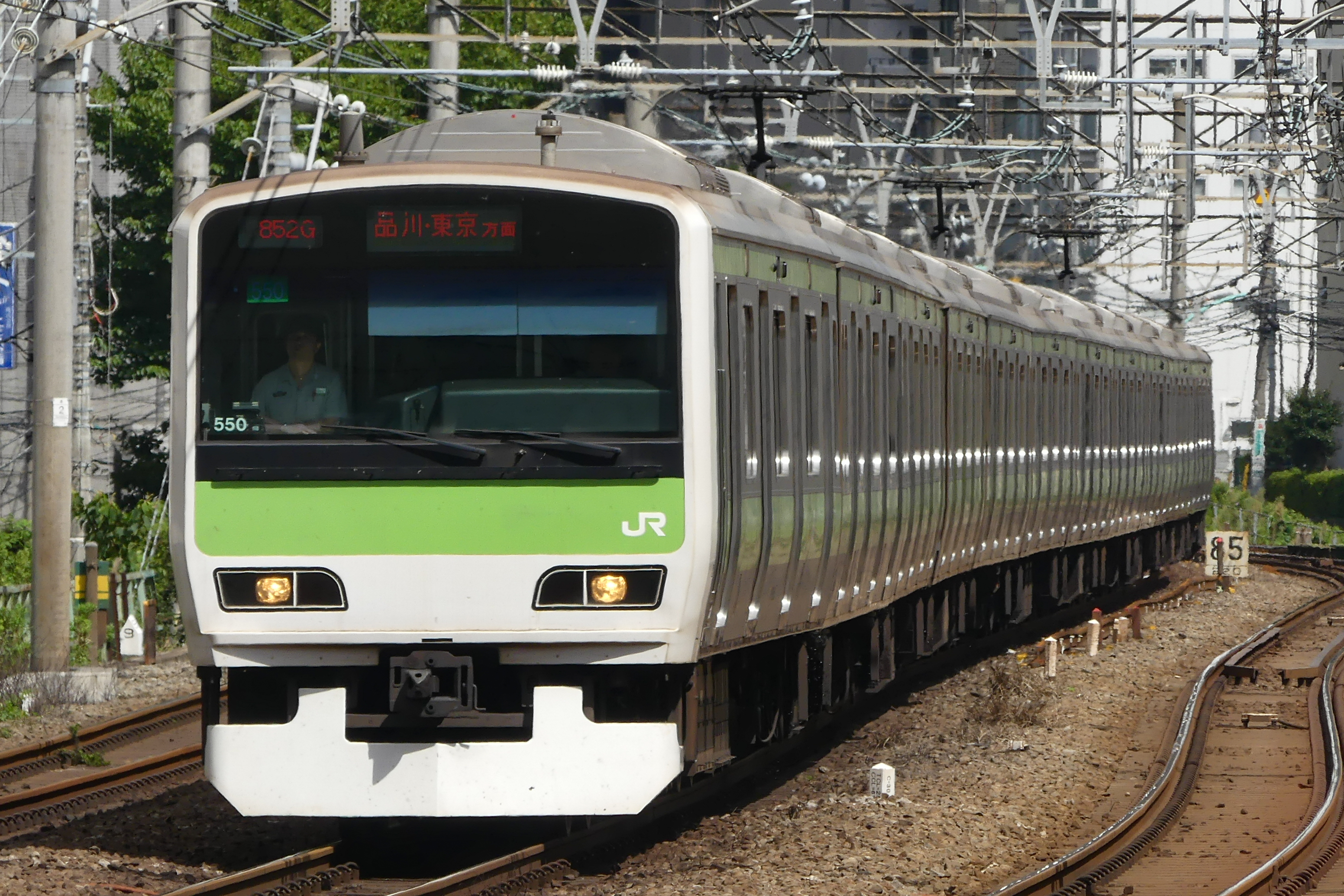
A Yamanote Line 11-car set in August 2018

=== Refurbishment ===
In October 2014, former Yamanote Line set 520 was released from overhaul as a ten-car set, numbered A520, allocated to Mitaka Depot, and finished in the yellow Chūō–Sōbu Line livery. It entered revenue service on the Chūō–Sōbu Line from 1 December 2014. A second set, former Yamanote Line set 540 was converted to a ten-car set for use on the Chūō–Sōbu Line in May 2016, renumbered A540. Between 2017 and 2020, the remaining sets were transferred to the Chūō–Sōbu Line as the E235 series replaced them on the Yamanote Line. The SaHa E231-4600 cars were removed as the Chūō–Sōbu Line uses 10-car trains. As a result, 48 of the 52 surplus SaHa E231-4600 cars were updated to E235 series standards (and re-numbered SaHa E235-4600) and continue to be used on the Yamanote Line, while the remaining 4 cars were scrapped. The last set of E231-500 (Set 506) on the Yamanote Line finished service in January 2020 and was converted for service on the Chūō–Sōbu Line as set A506.

=== Lines served ===
- Chūō–Sōbu Line

=== Former operations ===
- Yamanote Line

=== Formations ===
==== 10-car Chūō–Sōbu Line sets ====
As of 3 March 2020, 52 ten-car sets (A501-A552) are based at Mitaka depot in Tokyo and formed as shown below with six motored ("M") cars and four non-powered trailer ("T") cars.

	← Chiba Mitaka →									
Car No.	1	2	3	4	5	6	7	8	9	10
Designation	Tc	M	M'	T	M	M'	T	M	M'	Tc'
Numbering	KuHa E231-500	MoHa E231-500	MoHa E230-500	SaHa E231-600	MoHa E231-500	MoHa E230-500	SaHa E231-500	MoHa E231-500	MoHa E230-500	KuHa E230-500

- Cars 2, 5, and 8 each have one PS33B single-arm pantograph.
- Cars 1 and 10 have a wheelchair space.
- Car 4 is designated as a mildly air-conditioned car.

=== Previous formations ===
==== 11-car Yamanote Line sets (2010 to 2020) ====
	← Counterclockwise (Inner) Clockwise (Outer) →										
Car No.	11	10	9	8	7	6	5	4	3	2	1
Designation	Tc	T	M	M'	T	M	M'	T	M	M'	Tc'
Numbering	KuHa E231-500	SaHa E231-4600	MoHa E231-500	MoHa E230-500	SaHa E231-600	MoHa E231-500	MoHa E230-500	SaHa E231-500	MoHa E231-500	MoHa E230-500	KuHa E230-500

- Cars 3, 6, and 9 each had one PS33B single-arm pantograph.
- Cars 1 and 11 had a wheelchair space.
- Car 4 was designated as a mildly air-conditioned car.

==== 11-car Yamanote Line sets (2002 to 2011) ====
	← Counterclockwise (Inner) Clockwise (Outer) →										
Car No.	11	10	9	8	7	6	5	4	3	2	1
Designation	Tc	T'	M	M'	T'	M	M'	T	M	M'	Tc'
Numbering	KuHa E231-500	SaHa E230-500	MoHa E231-500	MoHa E230-500	SaHa E230-500	MoHa E231-500	MoHa E230-500	SaHa E231-500	MoHa E231-500	MoHa E230-500	KuHa E230-500

- Cars 3, 6, and 9 each had one PS33B single-arm pantograph.
- Cars 7 and 10 was a "six door car" meaning it had six pairs of doors per side.
- Cars 1 and 11 had a wheelchair space.
- Car 4 was designated as a mildly air-conditioned car.
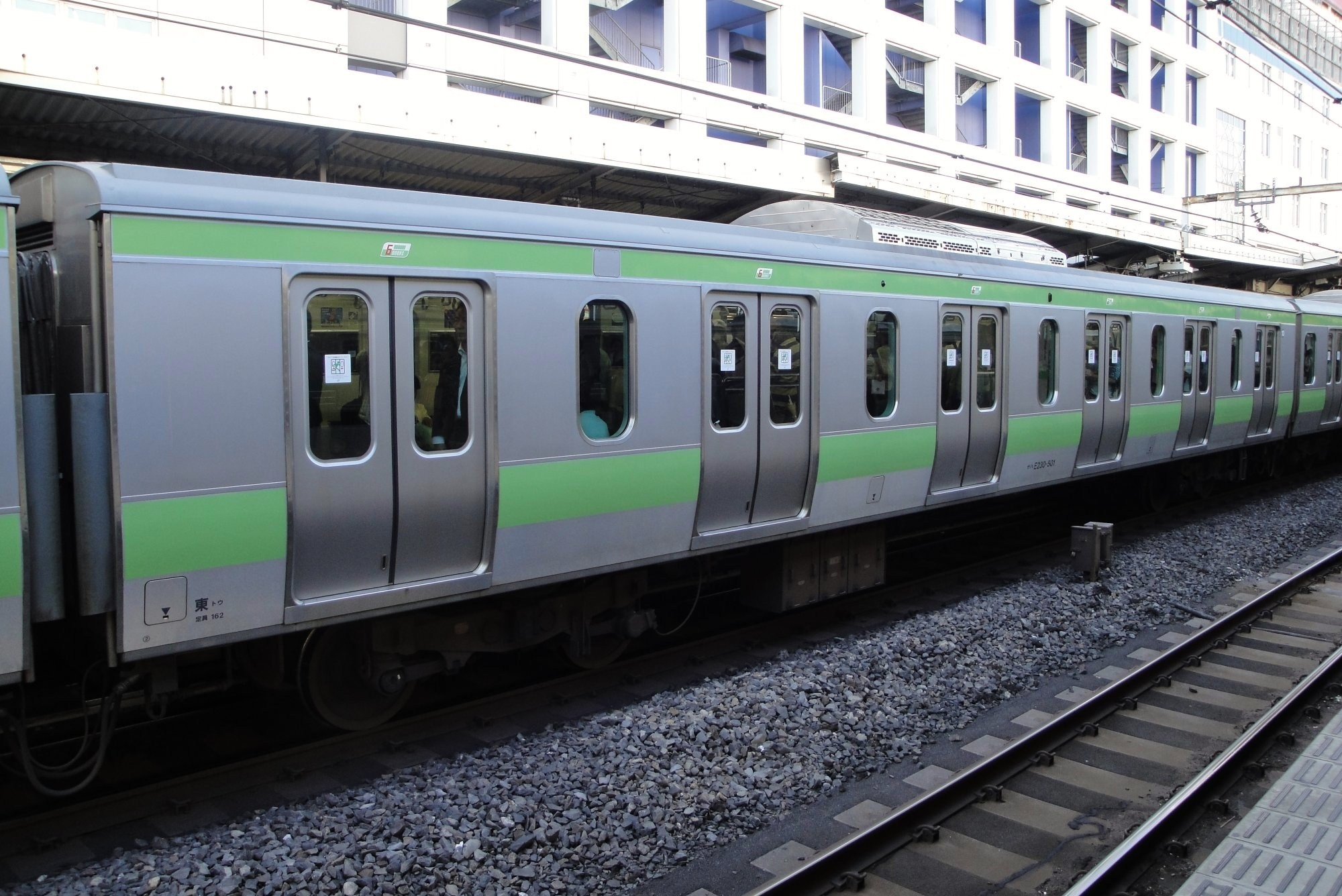
SaHa E230-500 6-door car as car No. 10 in June 2010

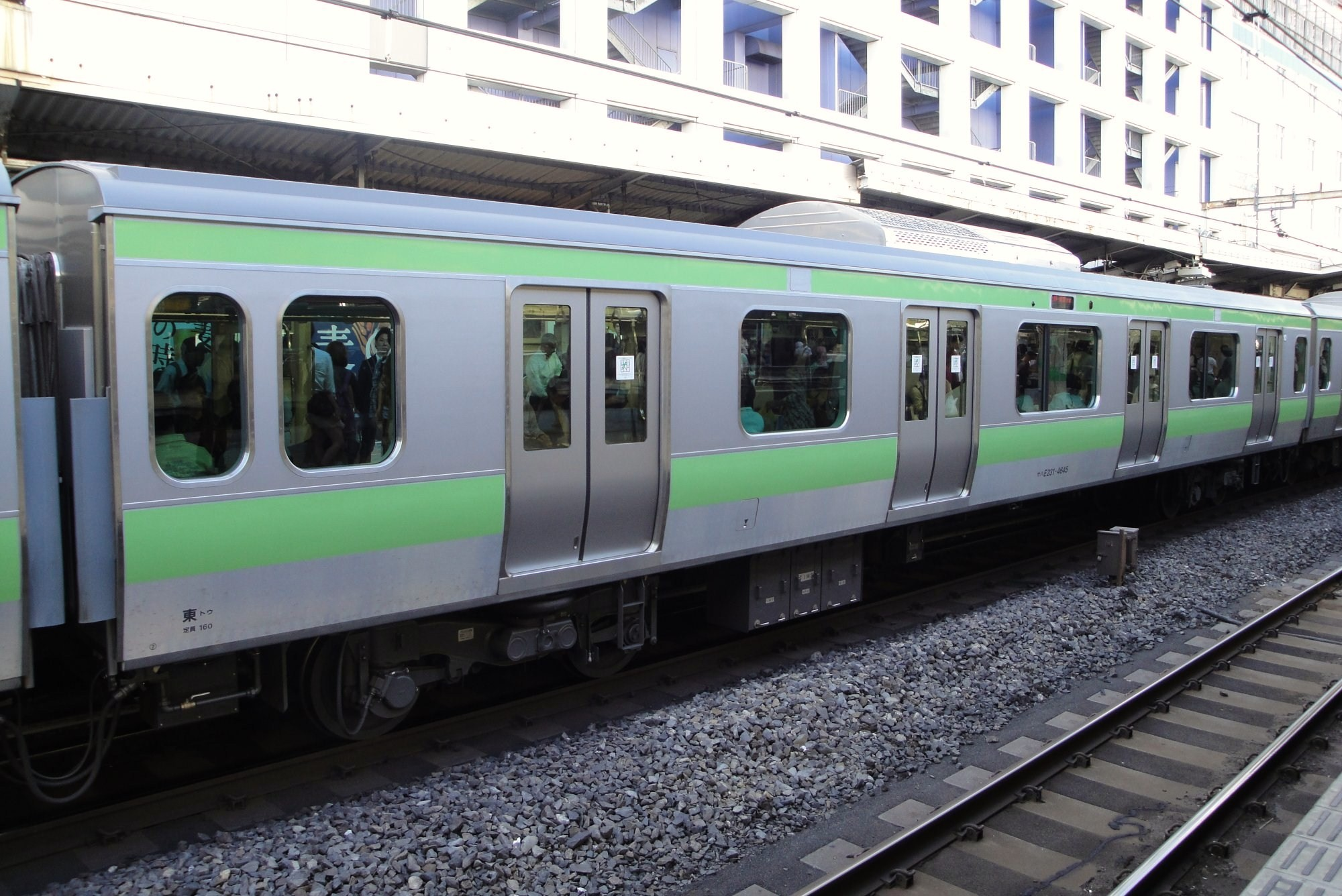
Replacement SaHa E231-4600 4-door car as car No. 10 in June 2010

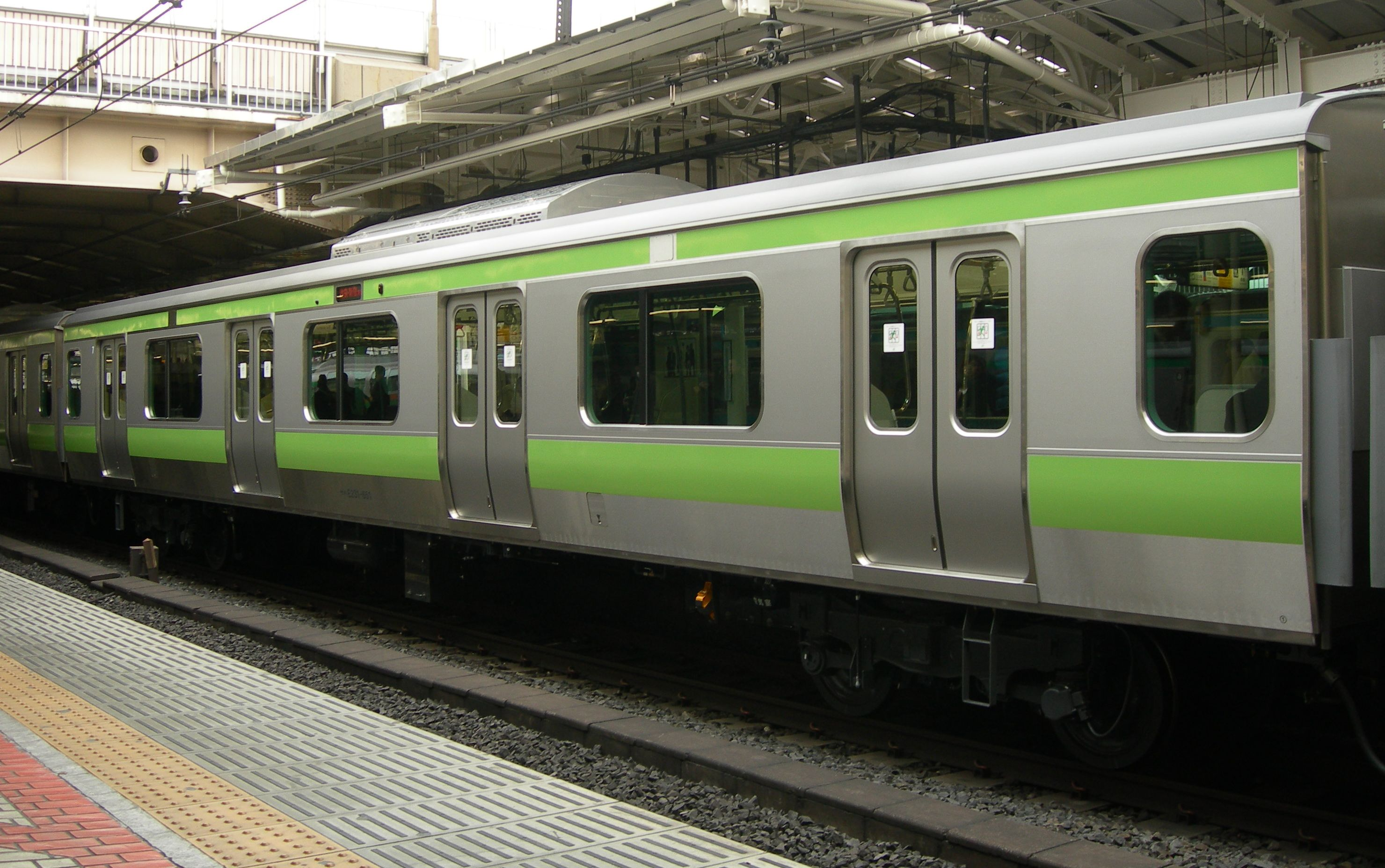
Replacement SaHa E231-600 4-door car as car No. 7 in March 2010

=== Interior ===
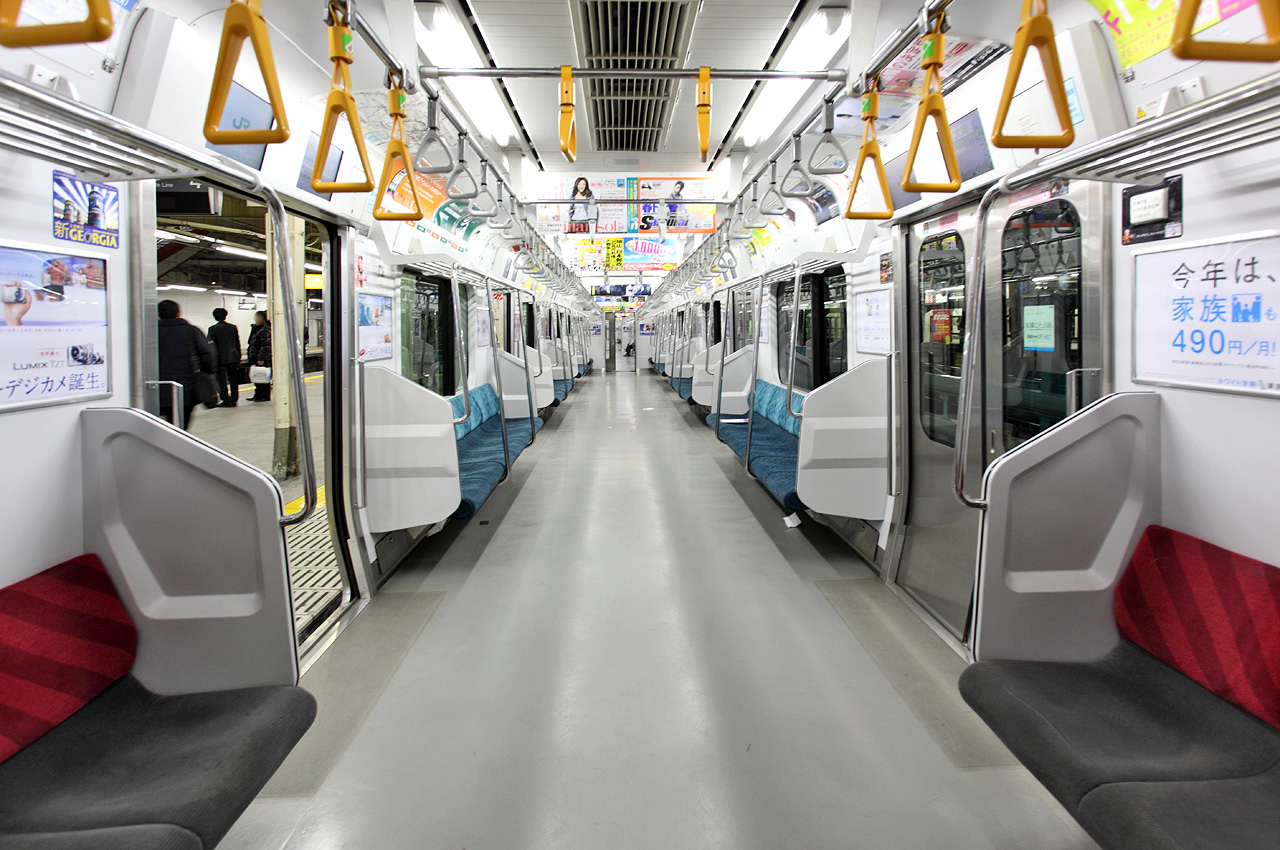
Interior view of SaHa E231-500 car

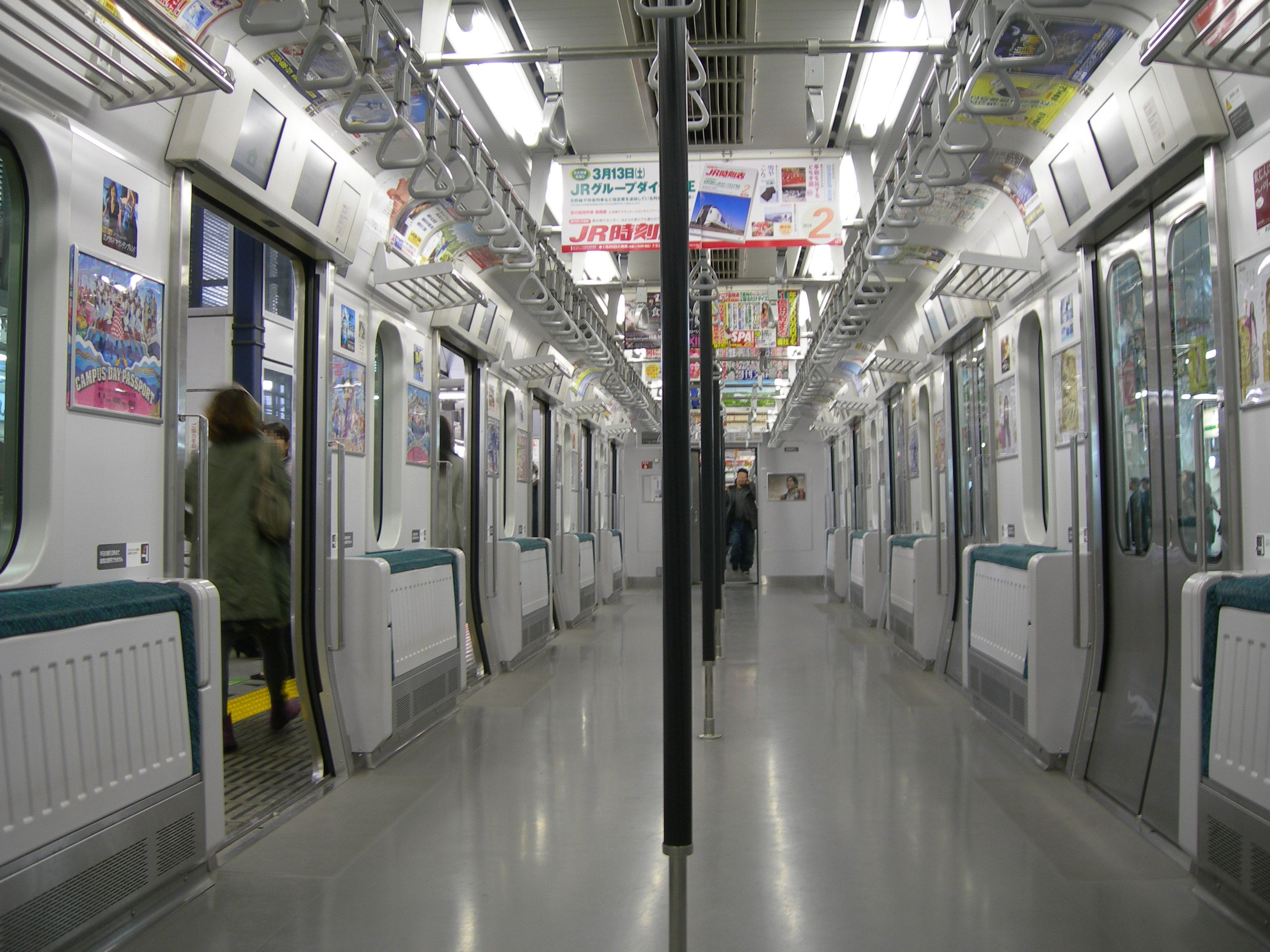
Interior view of SaHa E230-500 car with seats folded up for the rush hour

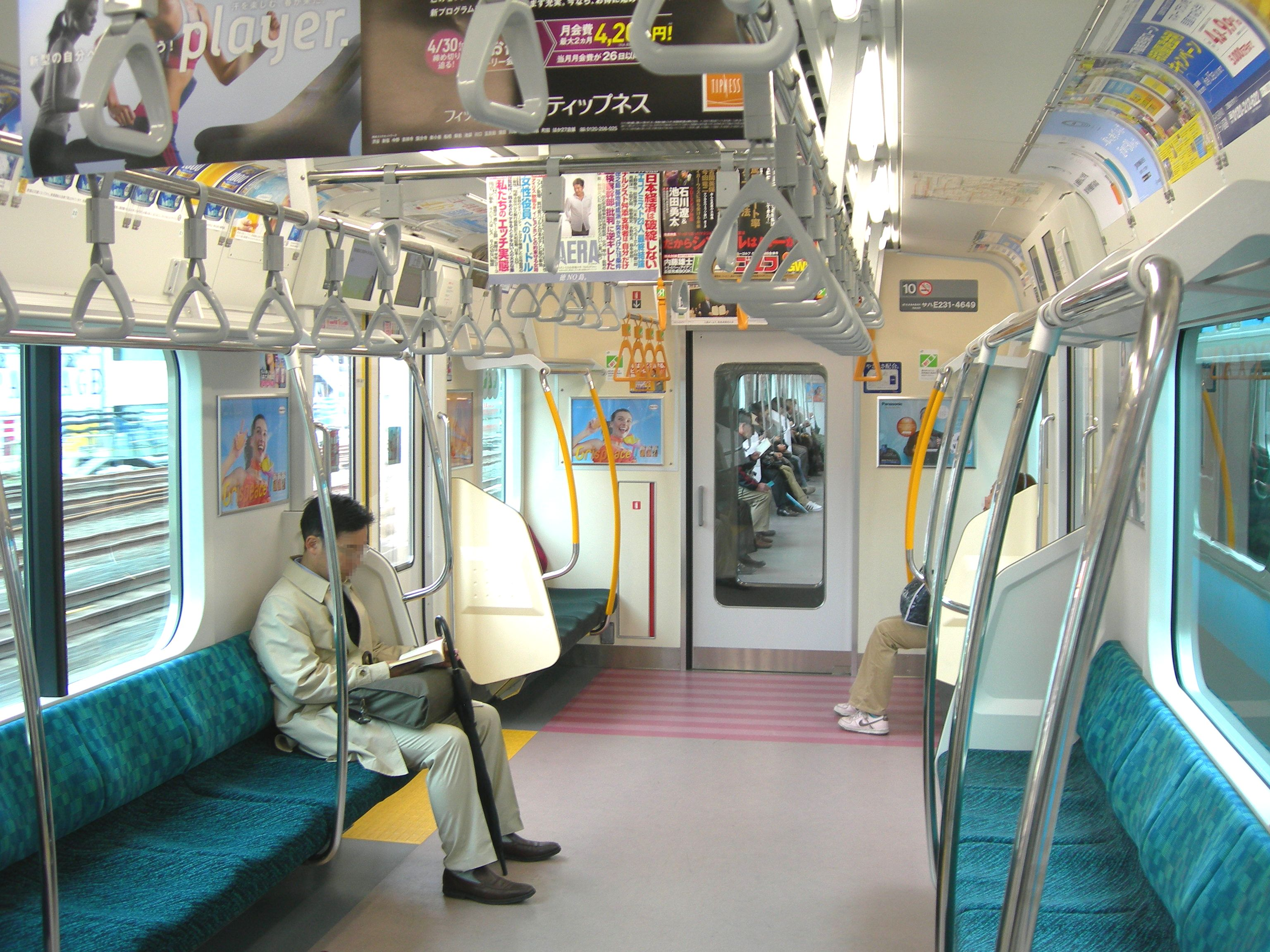
Interior view of SaHa E231-4600 car, showing E233 series derived interior, April 2010

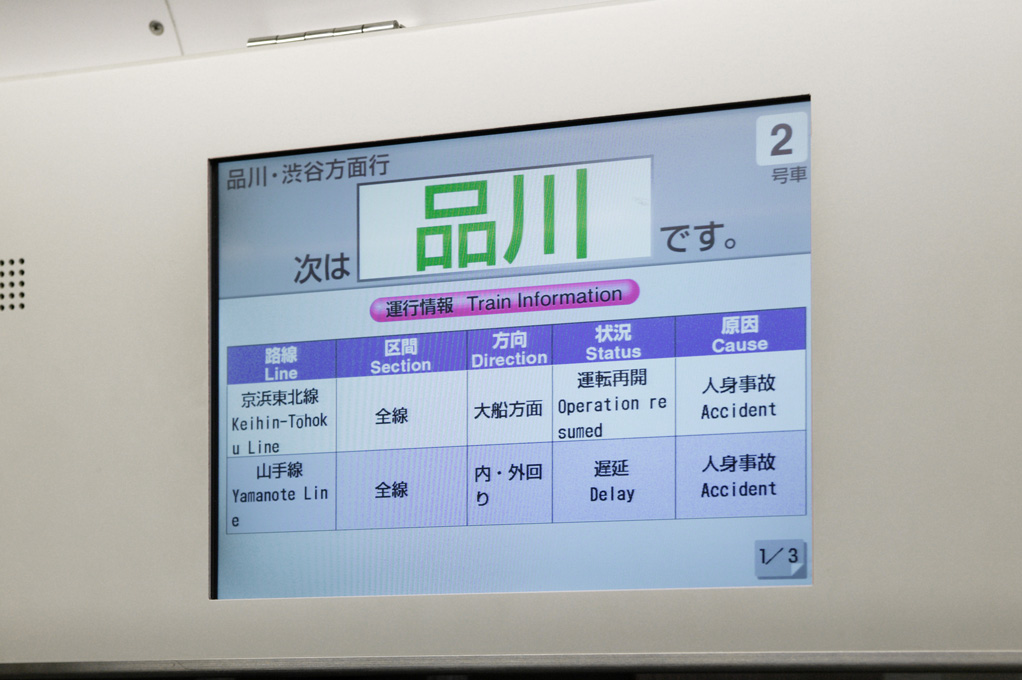
Passenger information screen

=== Special liveries ===
From 7 September to 4 December 2009, E231-500 series set 502 carried an all-over brown livery to mark the 100th anniversary of the naming of Yamanote Line in collaboration with the Meiji Seika confectionery company.

From 16 January to 28 December 2013, Yamanote Line E231-500 series set 545 operated in an all-over uguisu light green livery to mark the 50th anniversary of the first appearance of 103 series EMUs in this colour scheme.

From 11 October 2014 to 31 March 2015, Yamanote Line E231-500 series set 514 operated in an all-over "red brick" livery to commemorate the 100th anniversary of the opening of Tokyo Station, which opened in 1914.

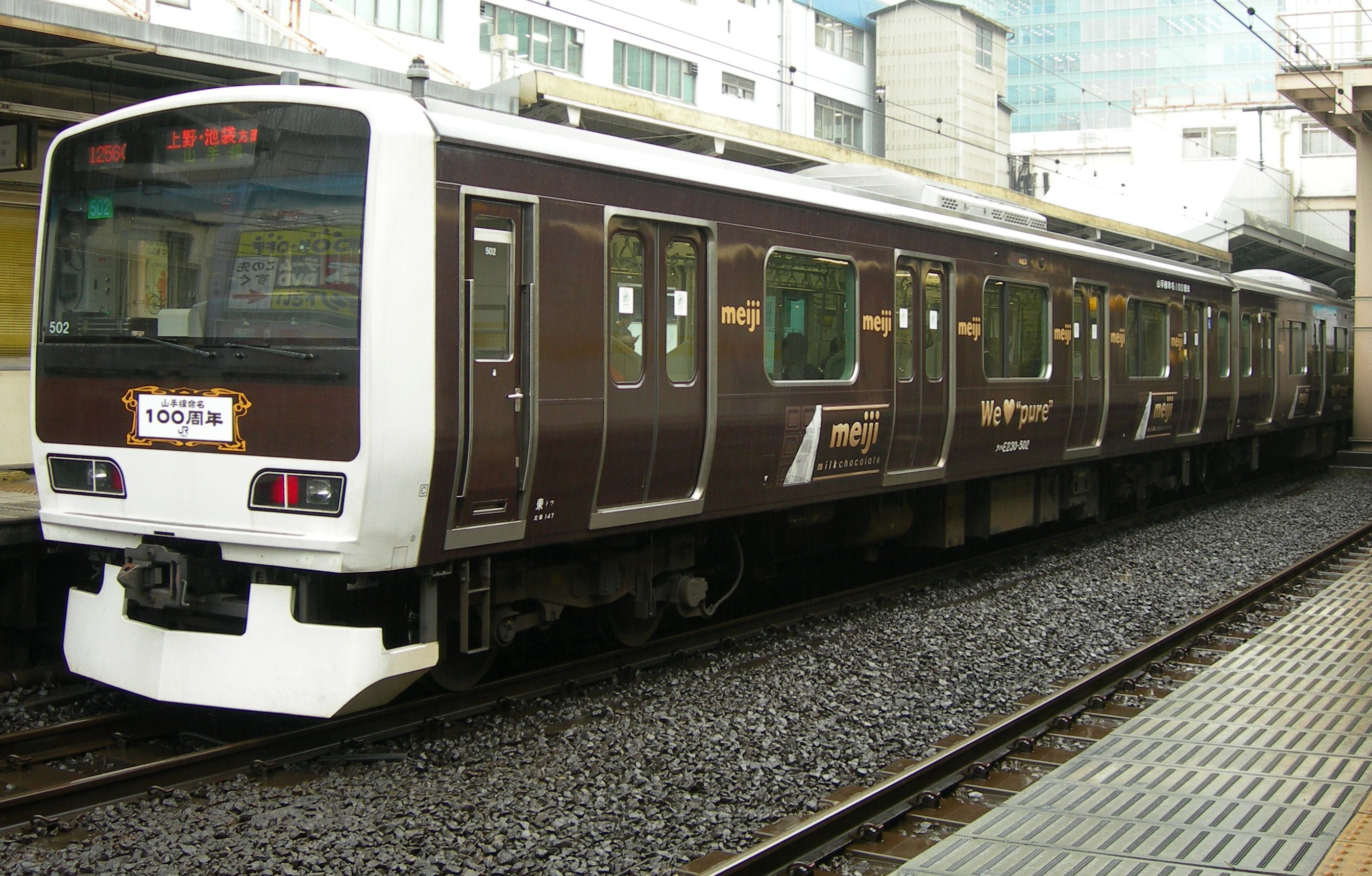
Set 502 in all-over brown livery in October 2009

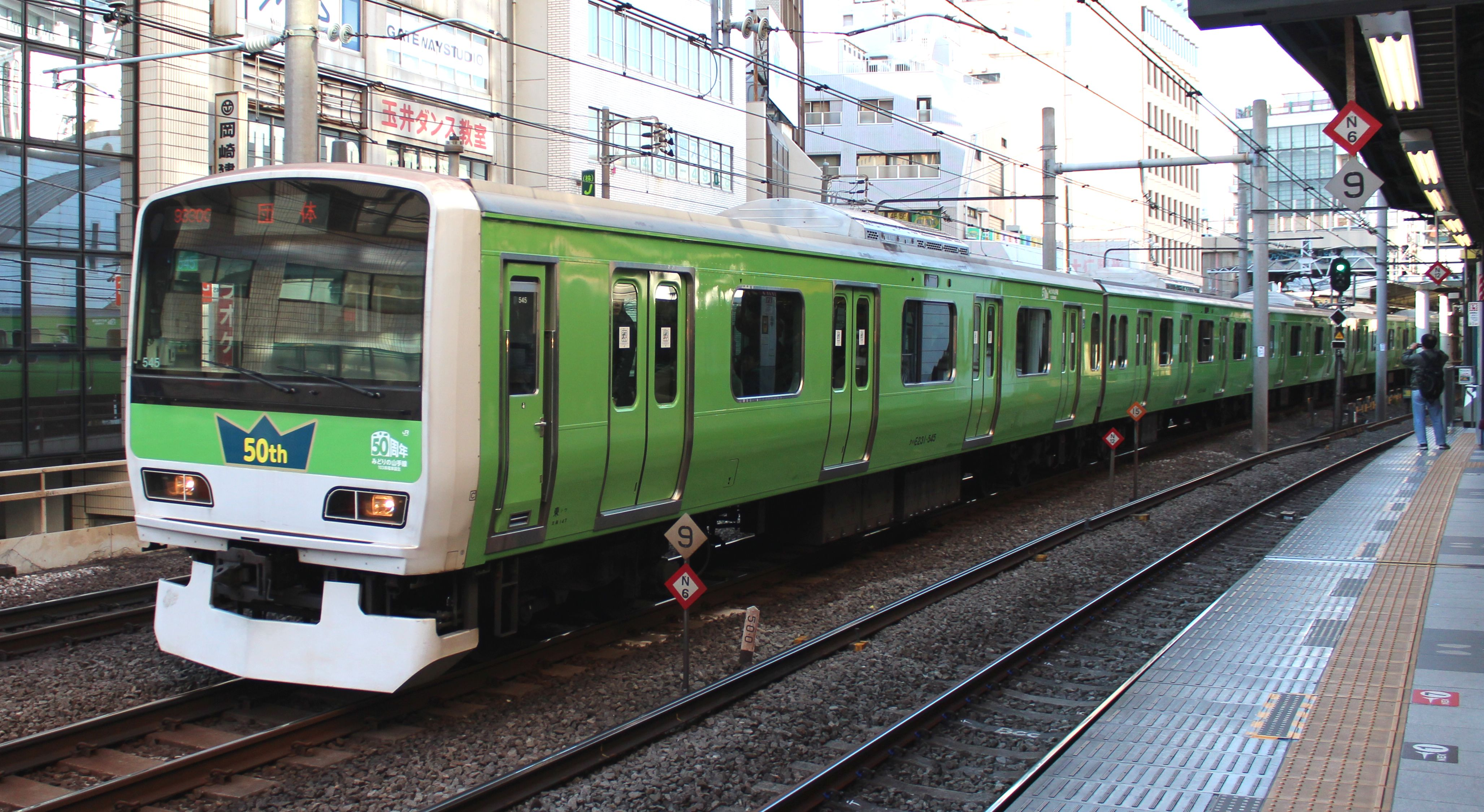
Set 545 in all-over light green livery in January 2013

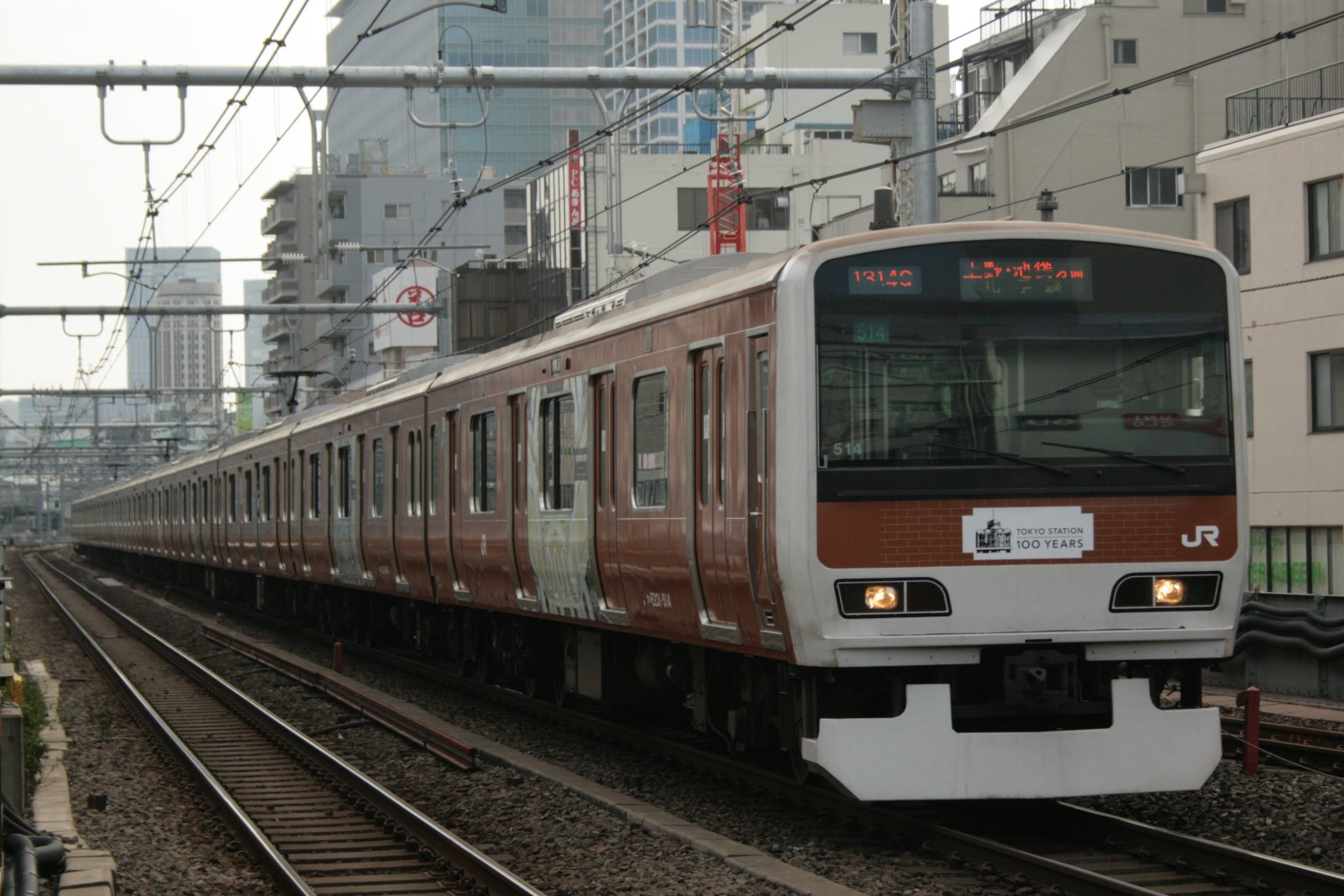
Set 514 in "red brick" livery in October 2014

== E231-800 series ==
E231-800 series
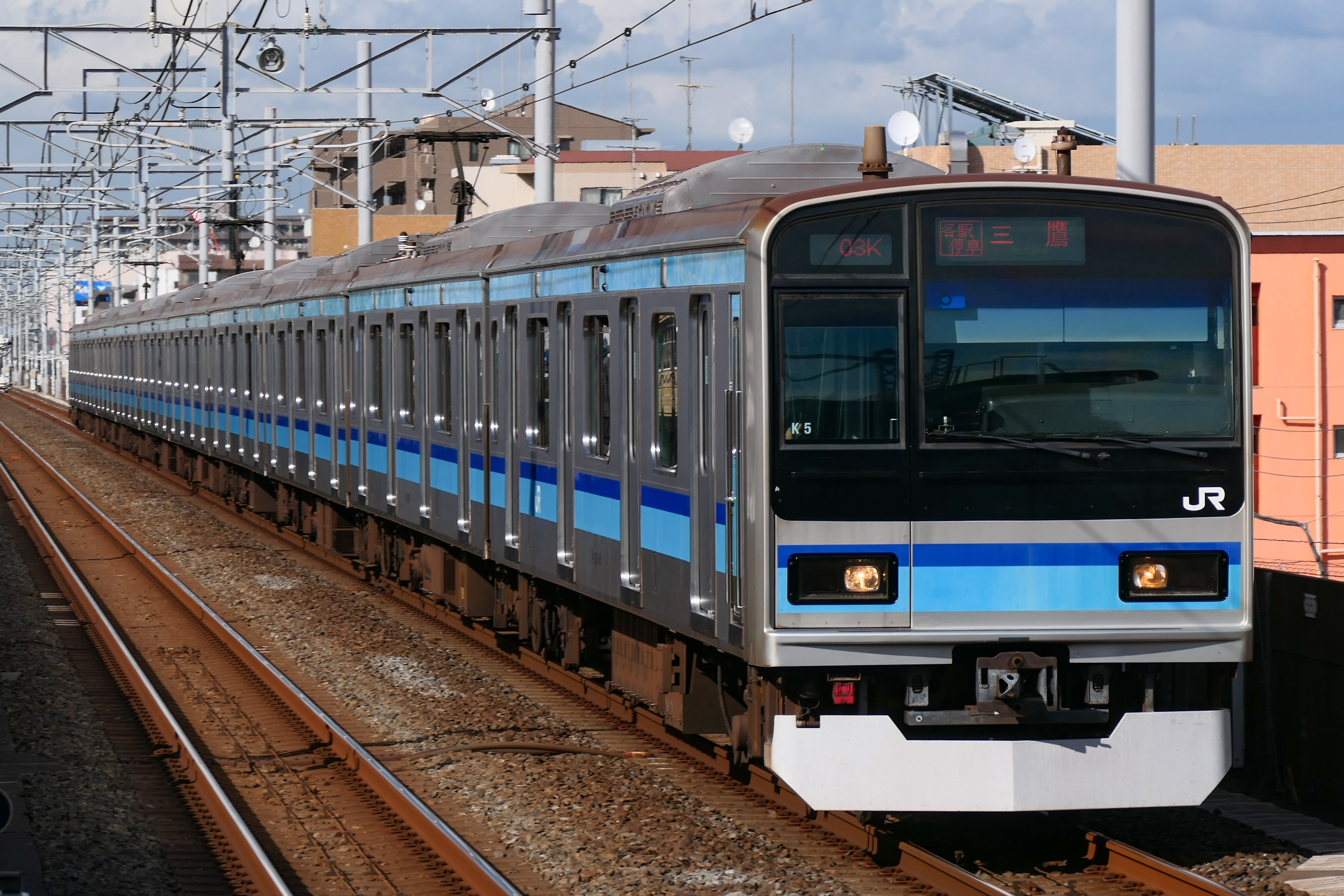
- An E231-800 series set in July 2022
- Replaced: 103-1200 series, 301 series
- Constructed: 2003
- Entered service: 1 May 2003
- Number built: 70 vehicles
- Number in service: 70 vehicles (7 sets)
- Formation: 10 cars per trainset
- Fleet numbers: K1–K7
- Operator: JR East
- Depot: Mitaka
- Lines served: Chūō–Sōbu Line, Tokyo Metro Tozai Line

Specifications
- Car body construction: Stainless steel
- Width: 2,800 mm (9 ft 2 in)
- Doors: 4 pairs per side
- Electric system: 1,500 V DC overhead catenary
- Current collection: PS33B pantograph
- Safety systems: ATC, ATS-SN/P
- Track gauge: 1,067 mm (3 ft 6 in)

The E231-800 series (E231系800番台) fleet consists of seven 10-car sets (K1 to K7), which are based at Mitaka Depot for use on Chūō–Sōbu Line and Tokyo Metro Tozai Line inter-running services. These sets were delivered between January and May 2003, entering service on 1 May 2003 and replacing the ageing fleet of 103 and 301 series sets.

The design of the E231-800 series is largely similar to that of the 209-1000 series—which was also designed with subway interoperation in mind—featuring end gangways that are used for emergency egress. Furthermore, the car bodies are 2,800 millimetres (9 ft 2 in) wide, as opposed to 2,950 millimetres (9 ft 8 in) for the rest of the E231 series fleet. They also have an increased power output due to the conditions of the Tozai Line.

=== Lines served ===
- Tokyo Metro Tozai Line
- Chūō–Sōbu Line (Mitaka – Nakano; Nishi-Funabashi – Tsudanuma)

=== Formations ===
As of 1 October 2018, seven ten-car sets (K1 to K7) are based at Mitaka depot in Tokyo and formed as shown below with six motored ("M") cars and four non-powered trailer ("T") cars.

	← Tsudanuma, Nishi-Funabashi Nakano, Mitaka →									
Car No.	1	2	3	4	5	6	7	8	9	10
Designation	Tc	M	M'	T	M	M'	T	M	M'	Tc'
Numbering	KuHa E231-800	MoHa E231-800	MoHa E230-800	SaHa E231-800	MoHa E231-800	MoHa E230-800	SaHa E231-800	MoHa E231-800	MoHa E230-800	KuHa E230-800
Weight (t)	26.1	28.8	28.6	22.8	28.8	28.3	22.6	28.8	28.6	26.1
Capacity (total/seated)	141/46	156/51	156/54						156/51	141/46

- Cars 2, 5, and 8 each have one PS33B single-arm pantograph.
- Cars 2 and 9 have a wheelchair space.
- Car 4 is designated as a mildly air-conditioned car.

== E231-900 series ==
E231-900 series
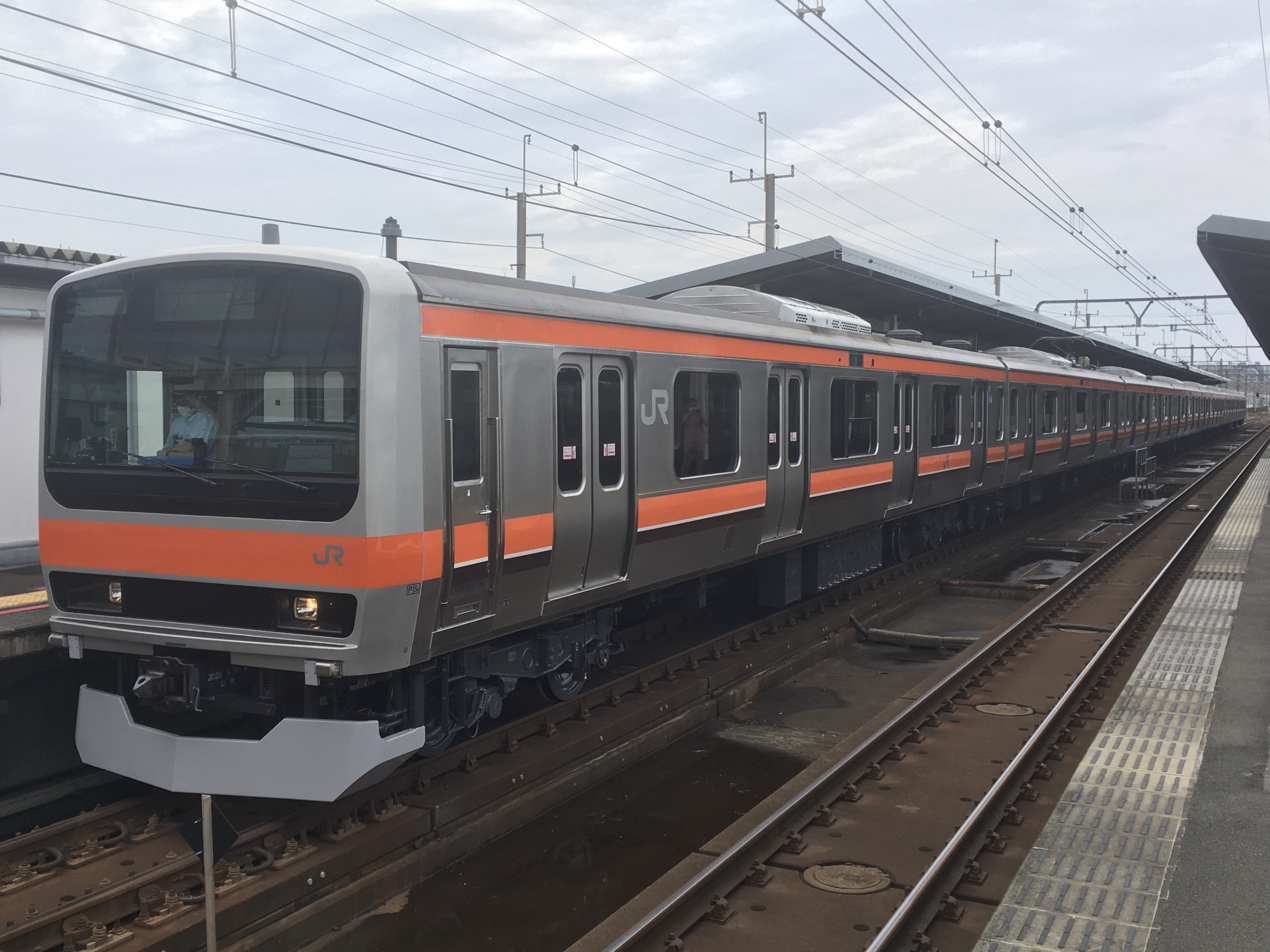
- Musashino Line E231-900 series in July 2020
- Replaced: 205 series
- Constructed: 1998 (as 209-950 series)
- Entered service: December 1998
- Refurbished: June 2000, March–July 2020
- Number built: 10 vehicles
- Number in service: 8 vehicles (1 set)
- Number scrapped: 2 vehicles
- Formation: 8 (previously 10) cars
- Fleet numbers: MU1; Previously: B901
- Operator: JR East
- Depots: Keiyō; Previously: Mitaka
- Lines served: Keiyō Line, Musashino Line; Previously: Chūō–Sōbu Line

Specifications
- Car body construction: Stainless steel
- Width: 2,950 mm (9 ft 8 in)
- Doors: 4 pairs per side (previously also 6 pairs per side)
- Electric system: 1,500 V DC overhead catenary
- Current collection: PS33B pantograph
- Track gauge: 1,067 mm (3 ft 6 in)

This was the prototype E231 series set, built jointly by Tokyu Car and JR East's Niitsu factory, and delivered in October 1998 for the Chūō–Sōbu Line, classified as 209-950 series. It was reclassified as E231-900 series in June 2000.

On 25 February 2020, it operated its last revenue service on the Chūō–Sōbu Line. The set was refurbished at Ōmiya Rolling Stock Center between 3 March and 10 July for transfer to the Musashino Line and associated through services and reentered service on 20 July.

=== Lines served ===
- Musashino Line, Keiyō Line (also Musashino and Shimōsa)

=== Former operations ===
- Chūō–Sōbu Line

=== Formation ===
==== 8-car Musashino Line ====
As of 20 July 2020, one eight-car set (MU1) is based at Keiyō Depot and formed as shown below with four motored ("M") cars and four non-powered trailer ("T") cars.

	← Tokyo, Kaihimmakuhari, Nishi-Funabashi Fuchūhommachi →							
Car No.	1	2	3	4	5	6	7	8
Designation	Tc	M	M'	T		M	M'	Tc'
Numbering	KuHa E231-900	MoHa E231-900	MoHa E230-900	SaHa E231-900		MoHa E231-900	MoHa E230-900	KuHa E230-900

- Cars 2 and 6 each have one PS33B single-arm pantograph.
- Cars 1 and 8 have a wheelchair space.
- Car 4 is designated as a mildly air-conditioned car.

=== Previous formation ===
==== 10-car Chūō–Sōbu Line (2000 to 2020) ====
	← Chiba, Tsudanuma Nakano, Mitaka →									
Car No.	1	2	3	4	5	6	7	8	9	10
Designation	Tc	T	M	M'	T'	T		M	M'	Tc'
Numbering	KuHa E231-900	SaHa E231-900	MoHa E231-900	MoHa E230-900	SaHa E230-900	SaHa E231-900		MoHa E231-900	MoHa E230-900	KuHa E230-900

- Cars 3 and 8 each had one PS33B single-arm pantograph.
- Car 5 had six pairs of doors per side.
- Cars 1 and 10 had a wheelchair space.
- Car 4 was designated as a mildly air-conditioned car.
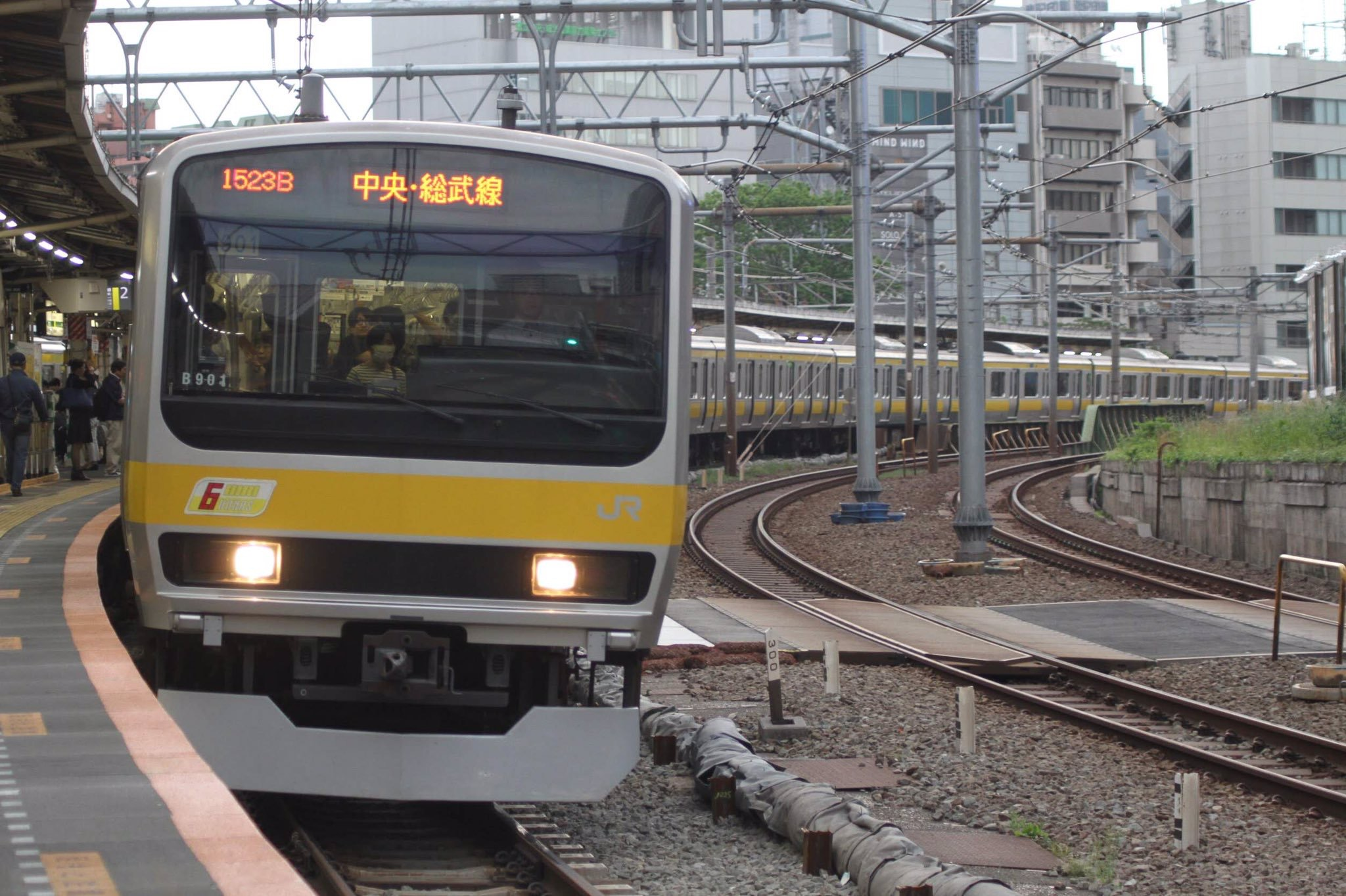
E231-900 series on Chūō–Sōbu Line in March 2019

== E231-1000 series ==
E231-1000 series
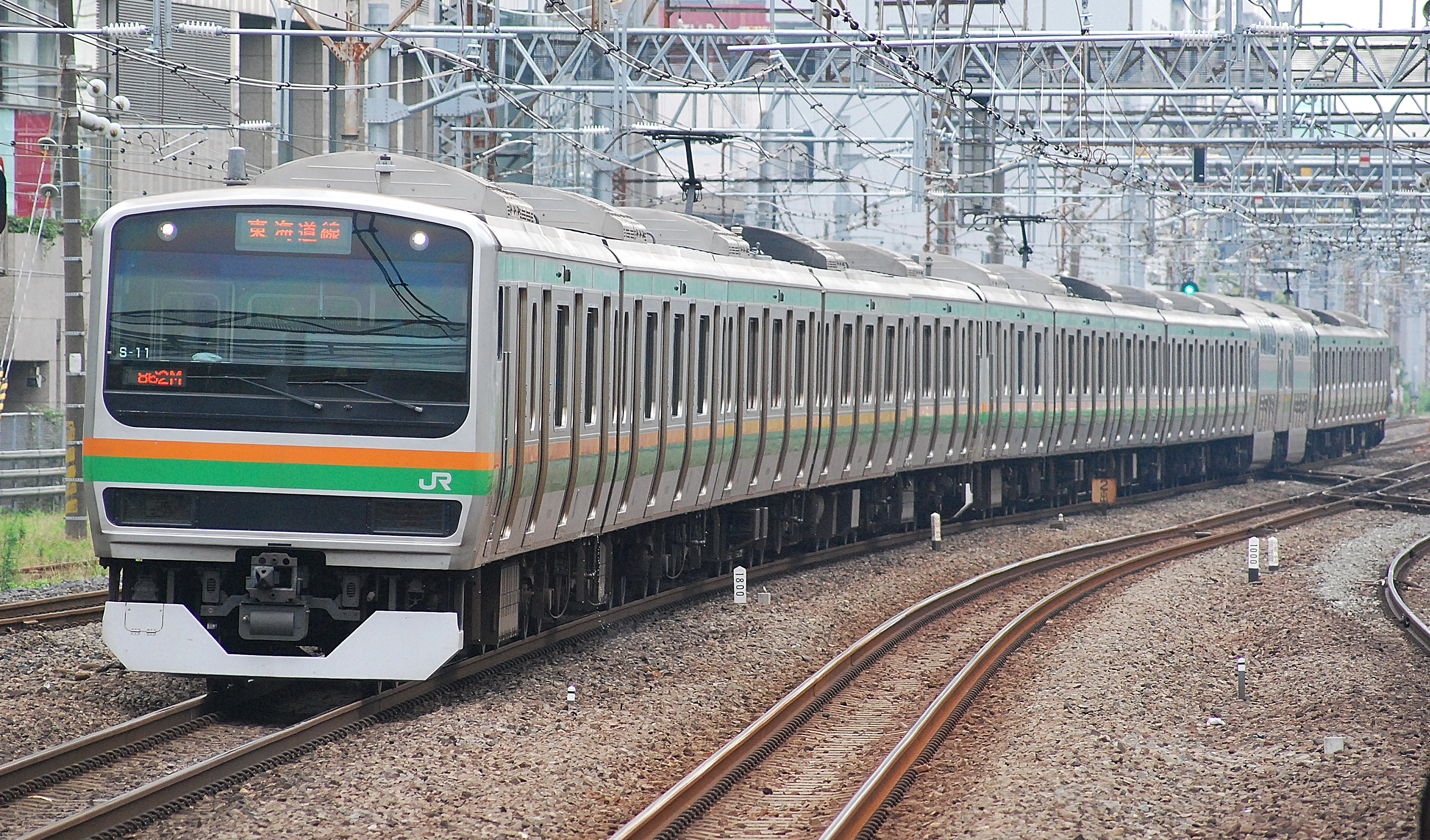
- E231-1000 set S-11 on the Tokaido Main Line
- Replaced: 113 series, 115 series
- Constructed: 2000–2006
- Entered service: 21 June 2000
- Number built: 1255 vehicles
- Number in service: 1255 vehicles (160 sets)
- Formation: 5/10 cars per trainset
- Operator: JR East
- Depots: Kōzu, Oyama
- Lines served: Takasaki Line; Utsunomiya Line; Tōkaidō Main Line; Ito Line; Shōnan–Shinjuku Line; Yokosuka Line; ■ Joetsu Line; ■ Ryōmō Line

Specifications
- Car body construction: Stainless steel
- Width: 2,950 mm (9 ft 8 in)
- Doors: 4 pairs per side 2 doors per side (Green cars)
- Electric system: 1,500 V DC overhead catenary
- Current collection: PS33B pantograph
- Multiple working: E233-3000 series
- Track gauge: 1,067 mm (3 ft 6 in)

These trains are designed for longer-distance suburban services, and include toilets, transverse seating bays (in some cars only), and bilevel Green cars (10-car sets only). The Ito Line and Joetsu Line mainly use 5-car sets, while the Shōnan–Shinjuku Line, Ueno–Tokyo Line, Takasaki Line, Tōkaidō Main Line, Utsunomiya Line use 10- or 10+5-car sets.

=== Lines served ===
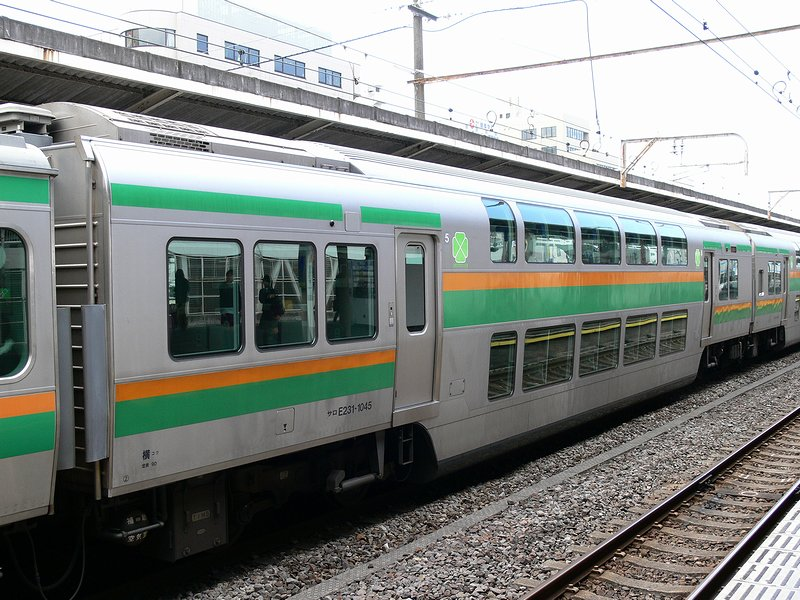
SaRo E231-1045 bilevel Green car in a Tōkaidō Main Line set in April 2007

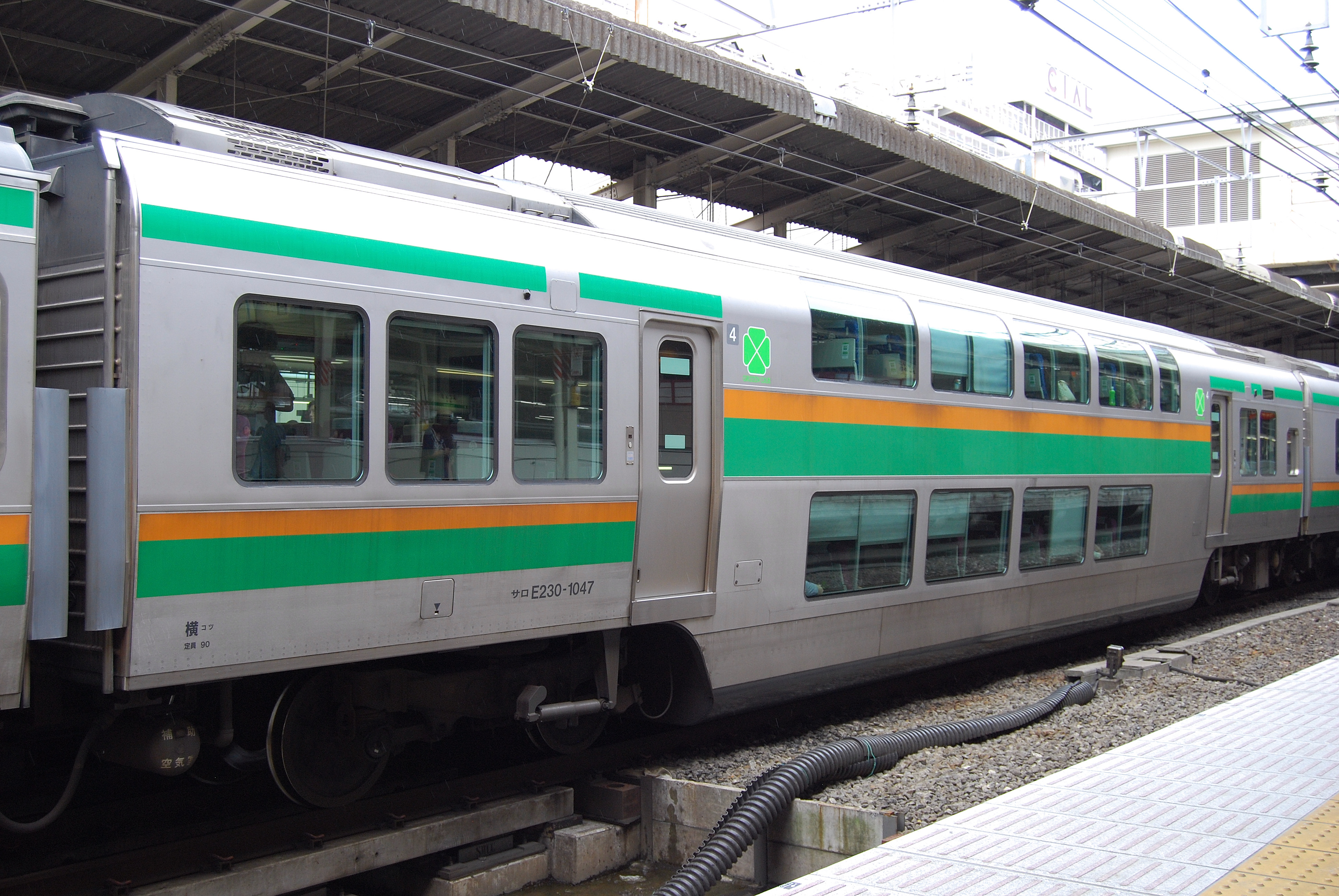
SaRo E230-1047 bilevel Green car in a Tōkaidō Main Line set in July 2010

Ten- and five-car suburban sets based at Oyama and Kōzu depots for use on the following lines.

- Takasaki Line (Ueno – Takasaki) and Joetsu Line (Takasaki – Shin-Maebashi) and Ryōmō Line (Shin-Maebashi – Maebashi)
- Utsunomiya Line (Ueno – Kuroiso)
- Tōkaidō Main Line (Tokyo – Atami / Numazu)
- * Itō Line (Atami – Itō, through services from Tōkaidō Main Line)
- Ueno–Tokyo Line (Ueno – Tokyo)
- * Takasaki Line (Ueno – Takasaki), Joetsu Line (Takasaki – Shin-Maebashi) and Ryōmō Line (Shin-Maebashi – Maebashi)
- * Utsunomiya Line (Ueno – Kuroiso)
- * Tōkaidō Main Line (Tokyo – Atami / Numazu) and Itō Line (Atami to Itō)
- Shōnan–Shinjuku Line (Ōfuna – Ōmiya )
- * Yokosuka Line (Zushi – Ōfuna) and Utsunomiya Line (Ōmiya – Utsunomiya)
- * Tōkaidō Main Line (Ōfuna – Odawara), Takasaki Line (Ōmiya – Takasaki), Joetsu Line (Takasaki – Shin-Maebashi) and Ryōmō Line (Shin-Maebashi – Maebashi)

=== Formations ===
==== 10-car K sets ====
As of 1 October 2018, 42 ten-car sets (K-01–K-42) are based at the Kōzu depot in Kanagawa Prefecture and formed as shown below with four motored ("M") cars and six non-powered trailer ("T") cars.

	← Kuroiso, Maebashi Zushi, Itō, Numazu →									
Car No.	10	9	8	7	6	5	4	3	2	1
Designation	Tc	M	M'	T		Tsd	Tsd'	M	M'	Tc'
Numbering	KuHa E231-8500	MoHa E231-3500	MoHa E230-1500	SaHa E231-1000		SaRo E231-1000	SaRo E230-1000	MoHa E231-1500	MoHa E230-3500	KuHa E230-8000

- Cars 3 and 9 each have one PS33B single-arm pantograph.
- Cars 1 and 10 have a wheelchair space.
- Cars 1, 5, and 10 each have a toilet (universal design in cars 1 and 10).
- Car 8 is designated as a mildly air-conditioned car.
- Cars 4 and 5 are bilevel Green Cars.

==== 10-car U sets ====
As of 1 October 2018, 49 ten-car sets (U501–U541, U584–U591) are based at the Oyama depot in Tochigi Prefecture and formed as shown below with four motored ("M") cars and six non-powered trailer ("T") cars.

	← Kuroiso, Maebashi Zushi, Itō, Numazu →									
Car No.	10	9	8	7	6	5	4	3	2	1
Designation	Tc	T	M	M'	T	Tsd	Tsd'	M	M'	Tc'
Numbering	KuHa E231-6000	SaHa E231-1000	MoHa E231-1000	MoHa E230-1000	SaHa E231-6000	SaRo E231-1000	SaRo E230-1000	MoHa E231-1500	MoHa E230-3500	KuHa E230-8000

- Cars 3 and 8 each have one PS33B single-arm pantograph.
- Cars 1 and 10 have a wheelchair space.
- Cars 1, 5, and 6 each have a toilet (universal design in car 1, Japanese-style in car 6).
- Car 8 is designated as a mildly air-conditioned car.
- Cars 4 and 5 are bilevel Green Cars.

==== 5-car sets ====
As of 1 October 2018, 34 five-car sets (S-01–S-34) are based at Kōzu depot in Kanagawa Prefecture and 35 five-car sets (U2–U118) are based at Oyama depot in Tochigi Prefecture. They are formed as shown below with two motored ("M") cars and three non-powered trailer ("T") cars.

	← Kuroiso, Kagohara Zushi, Numazu →				
Car No.	15	14	13	12	11
Designation	Tc	T	M	M'	Tc'
Numbering	KuHa E231-8000	SaHa E231-3000	MoHa E231-1000	MoHa E230-1000	KuHa E230-6000

- Car 13 has one PS33B single-arm pantograph.
- Cars 11 and 15 have a wheelchair space.
- Car 11 has a universal design toilet.

=== Interior ===
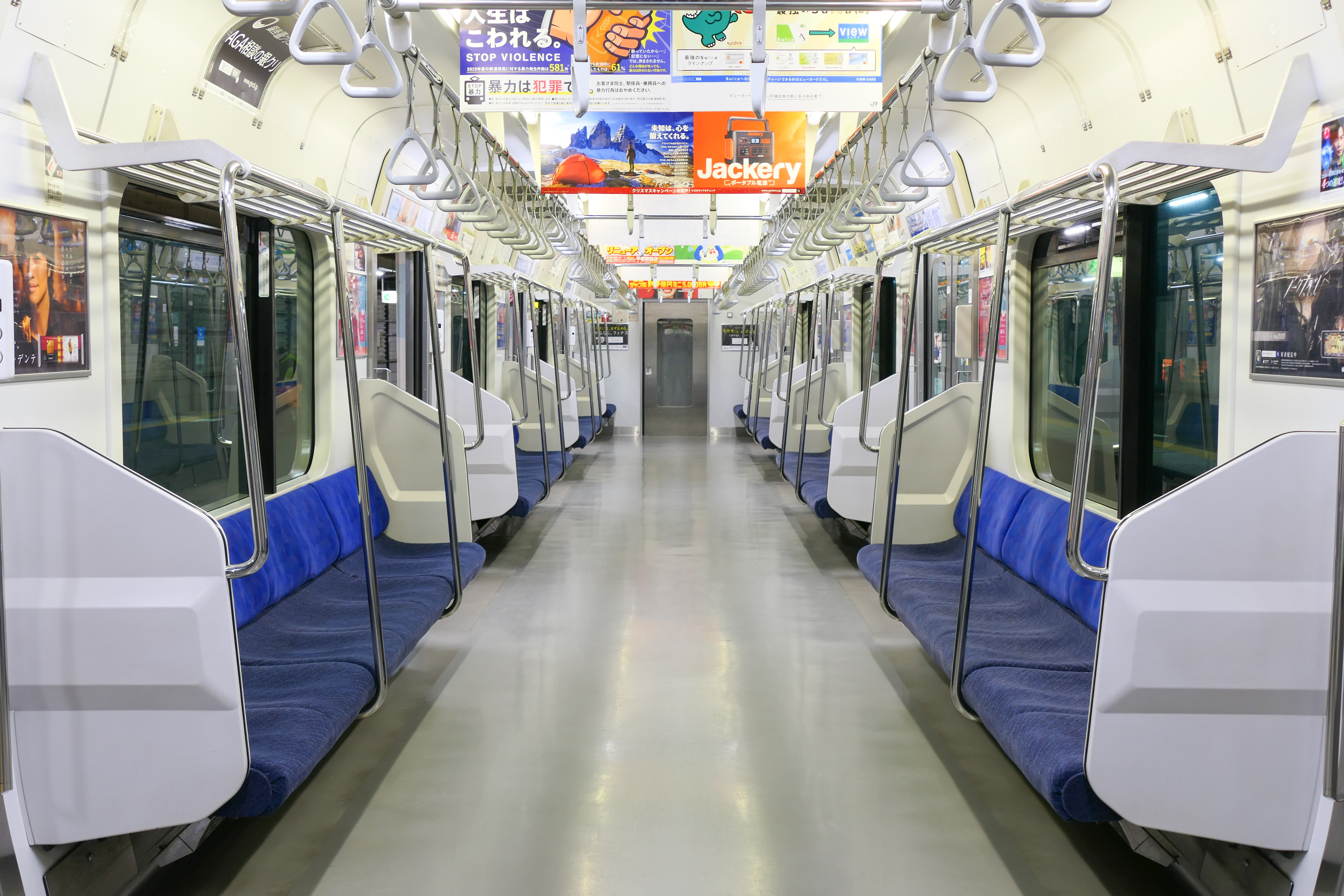
Interior of car with longitudinal seating

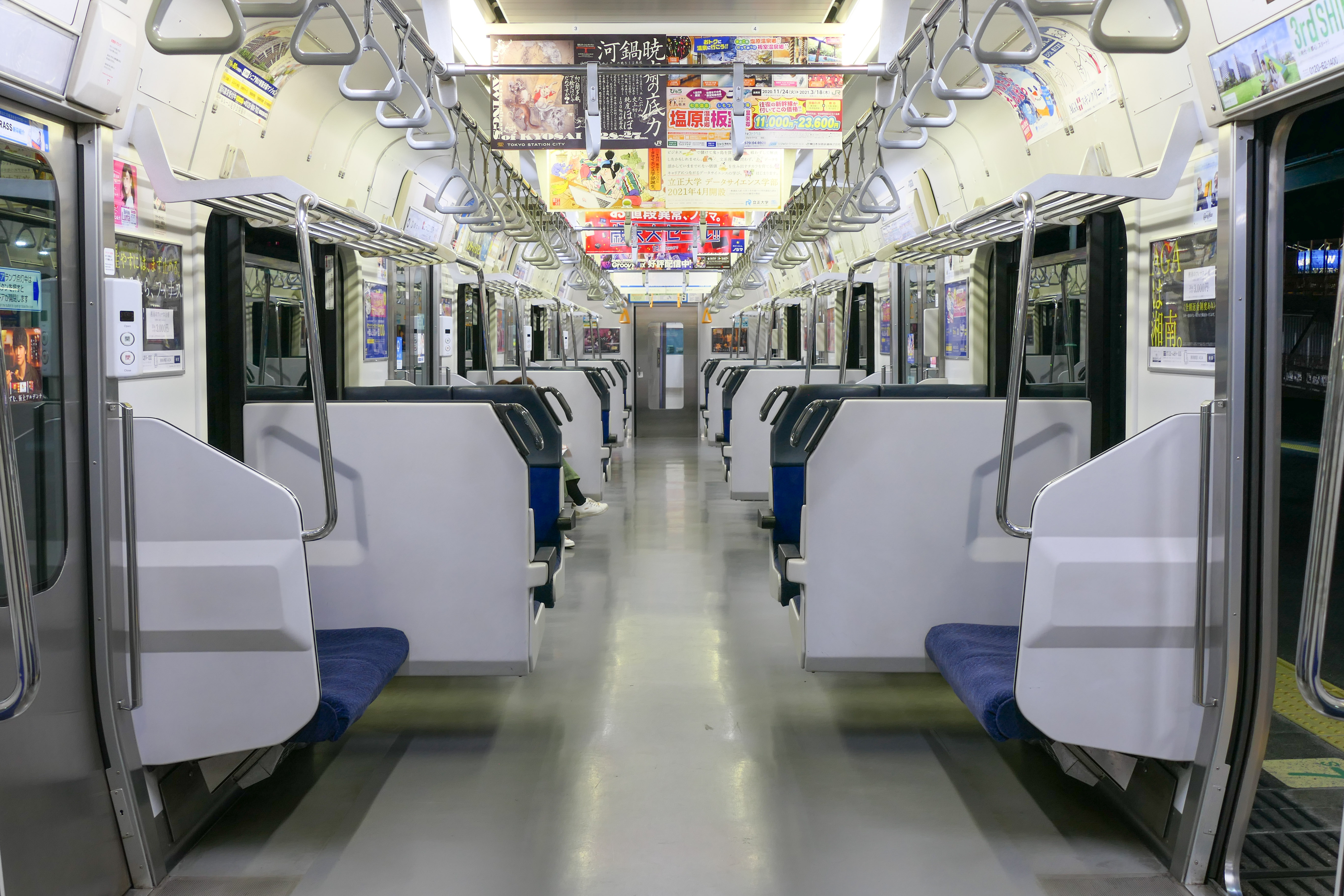
Interior of car with transverse seating bays

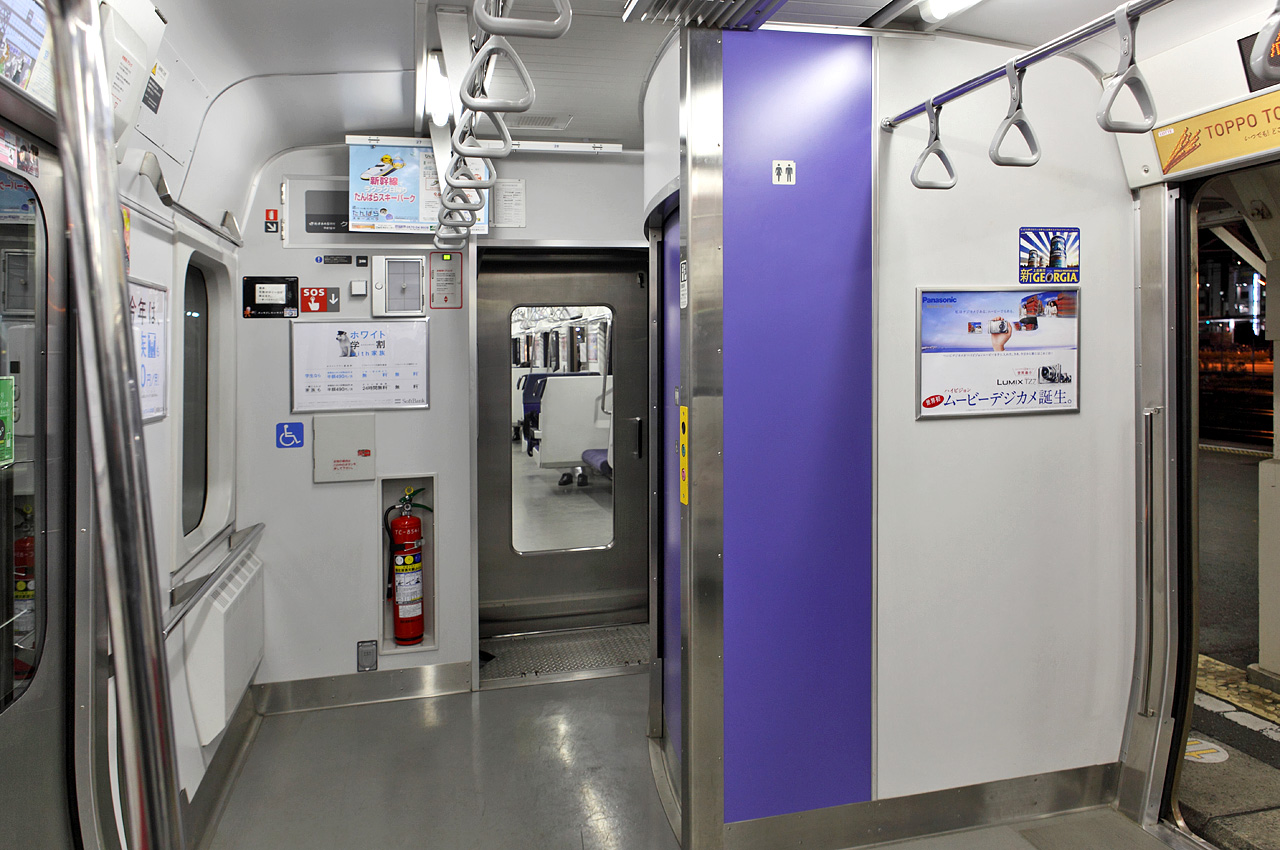
Toilet

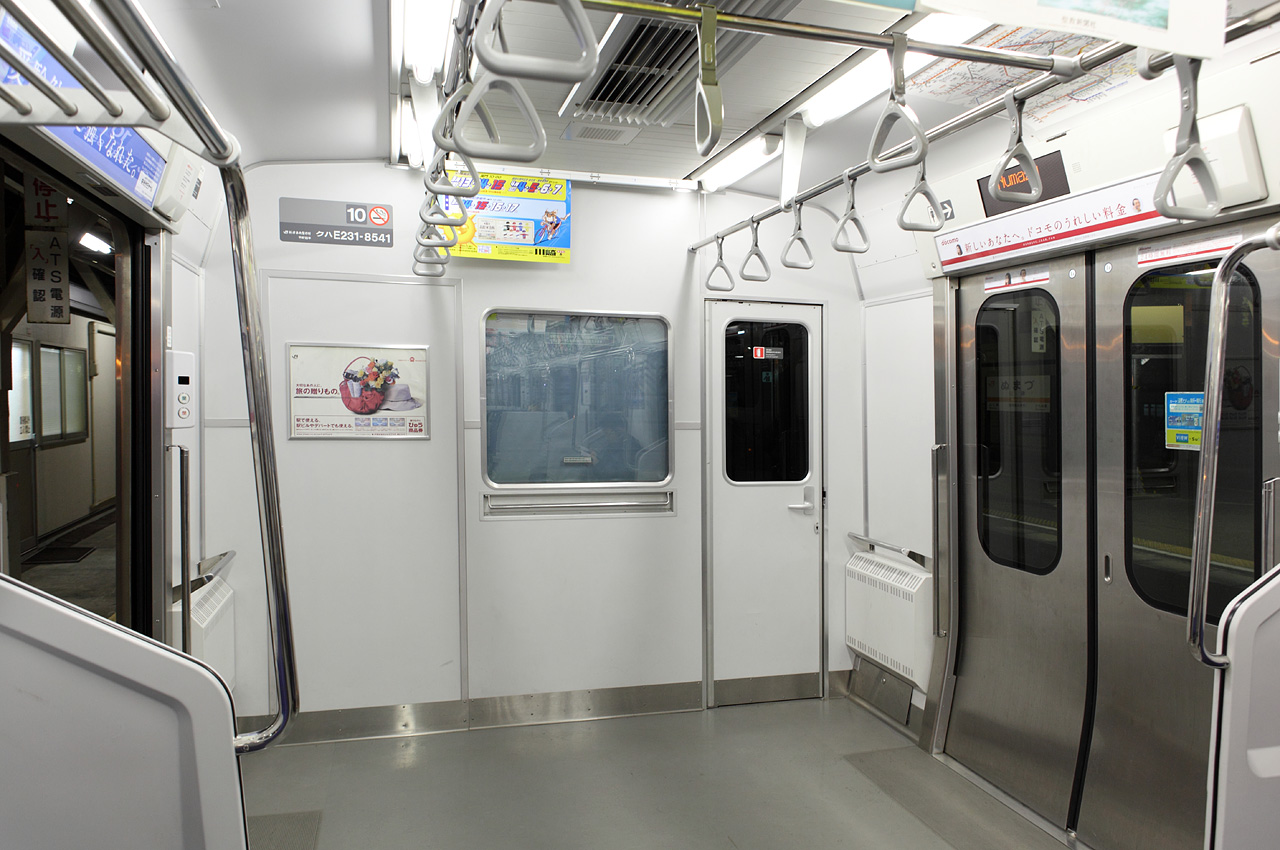
Driver's cab end

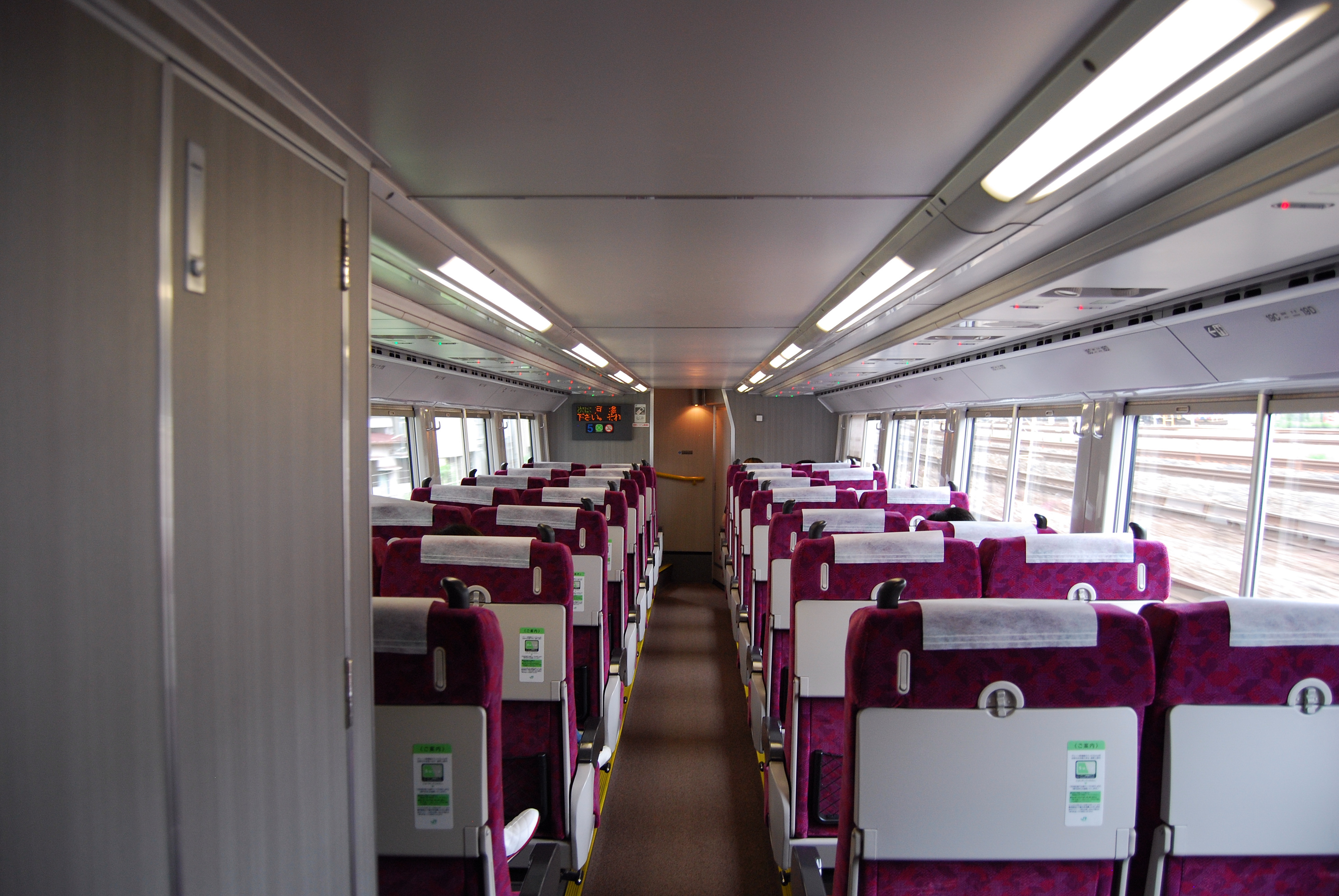
Bilevel Green Car lower deck with 2+2 seating

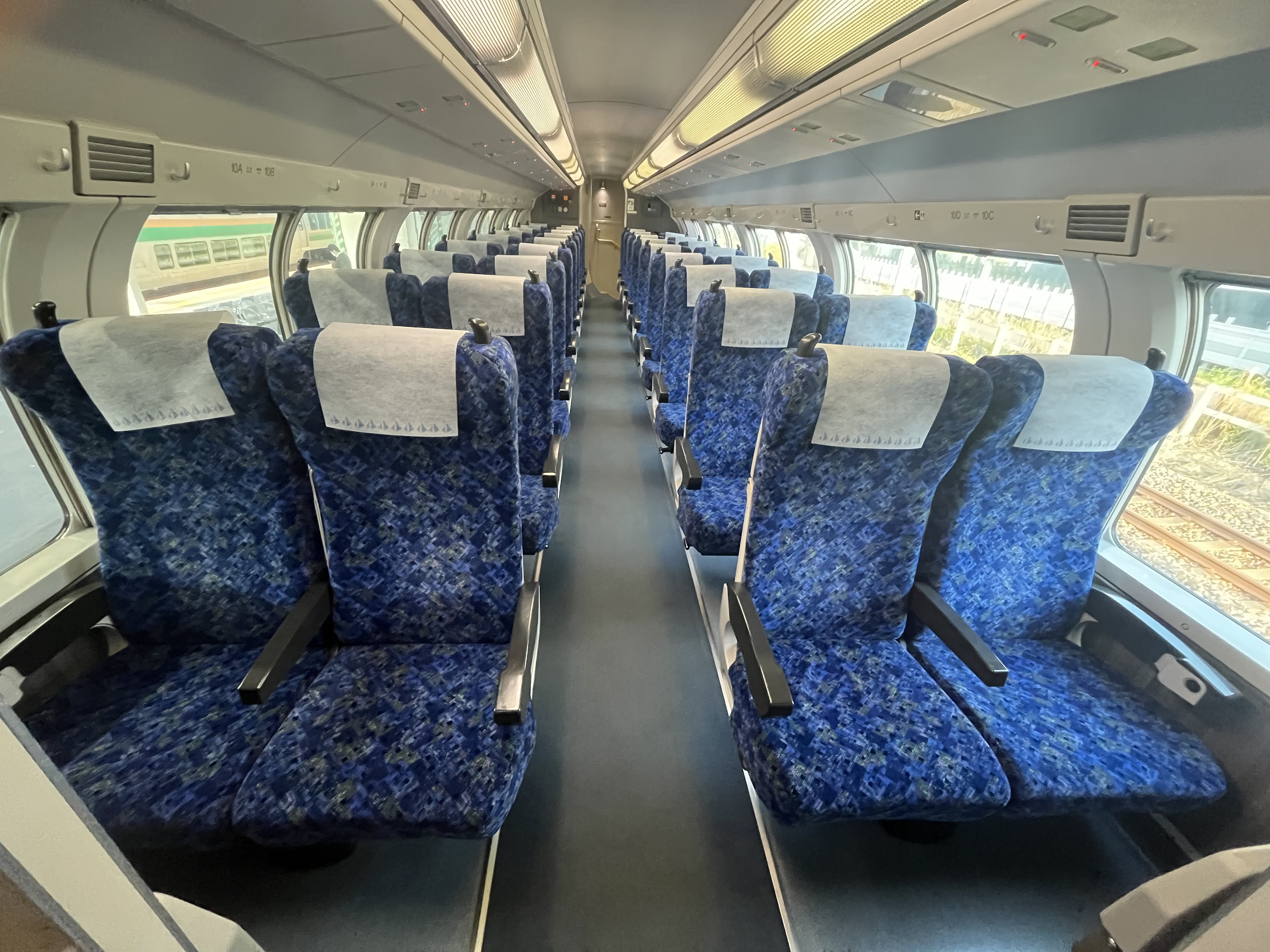
Bilevel Green Car upper deck with 2+2 seating

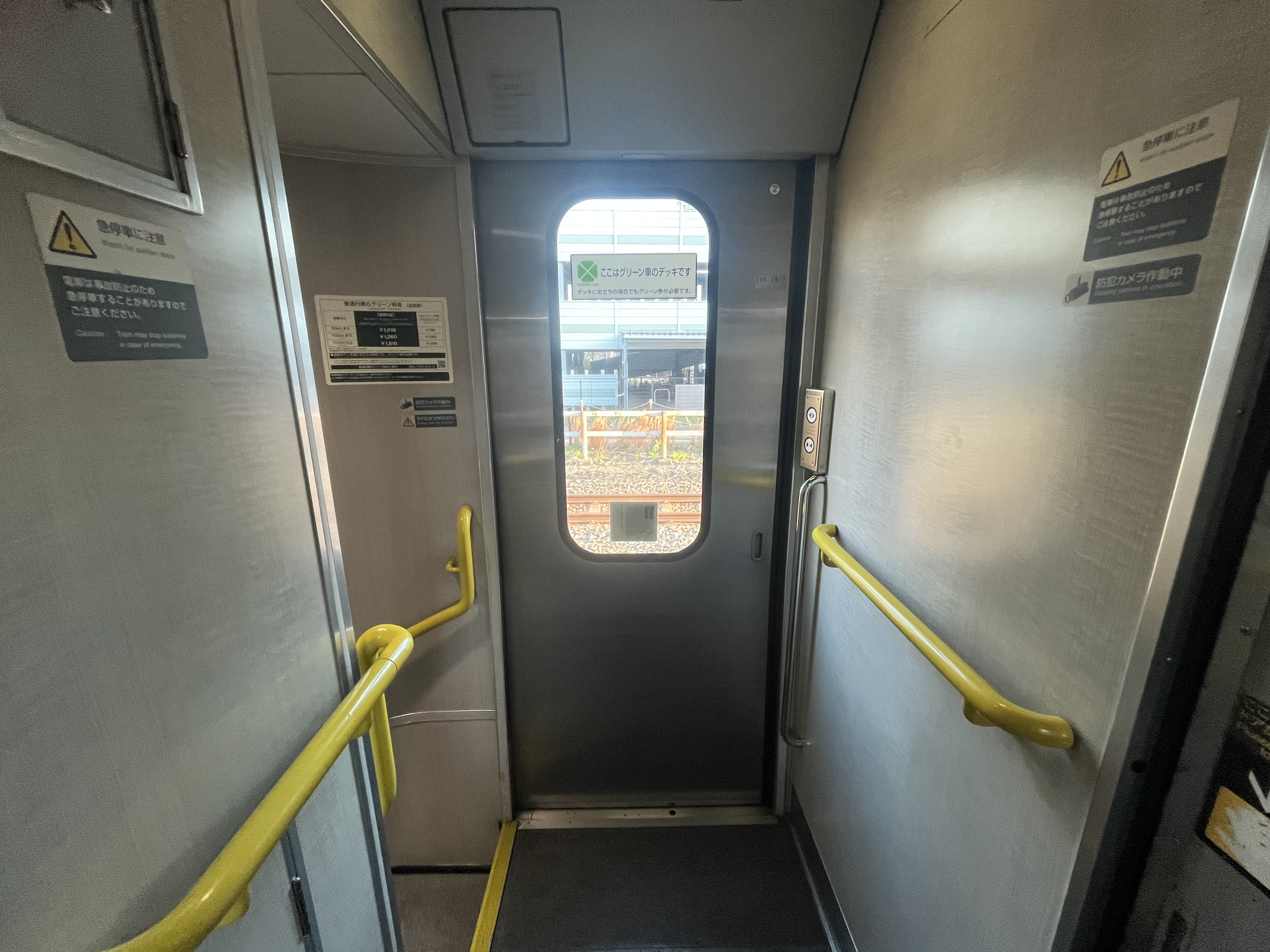
Green car passenger doors

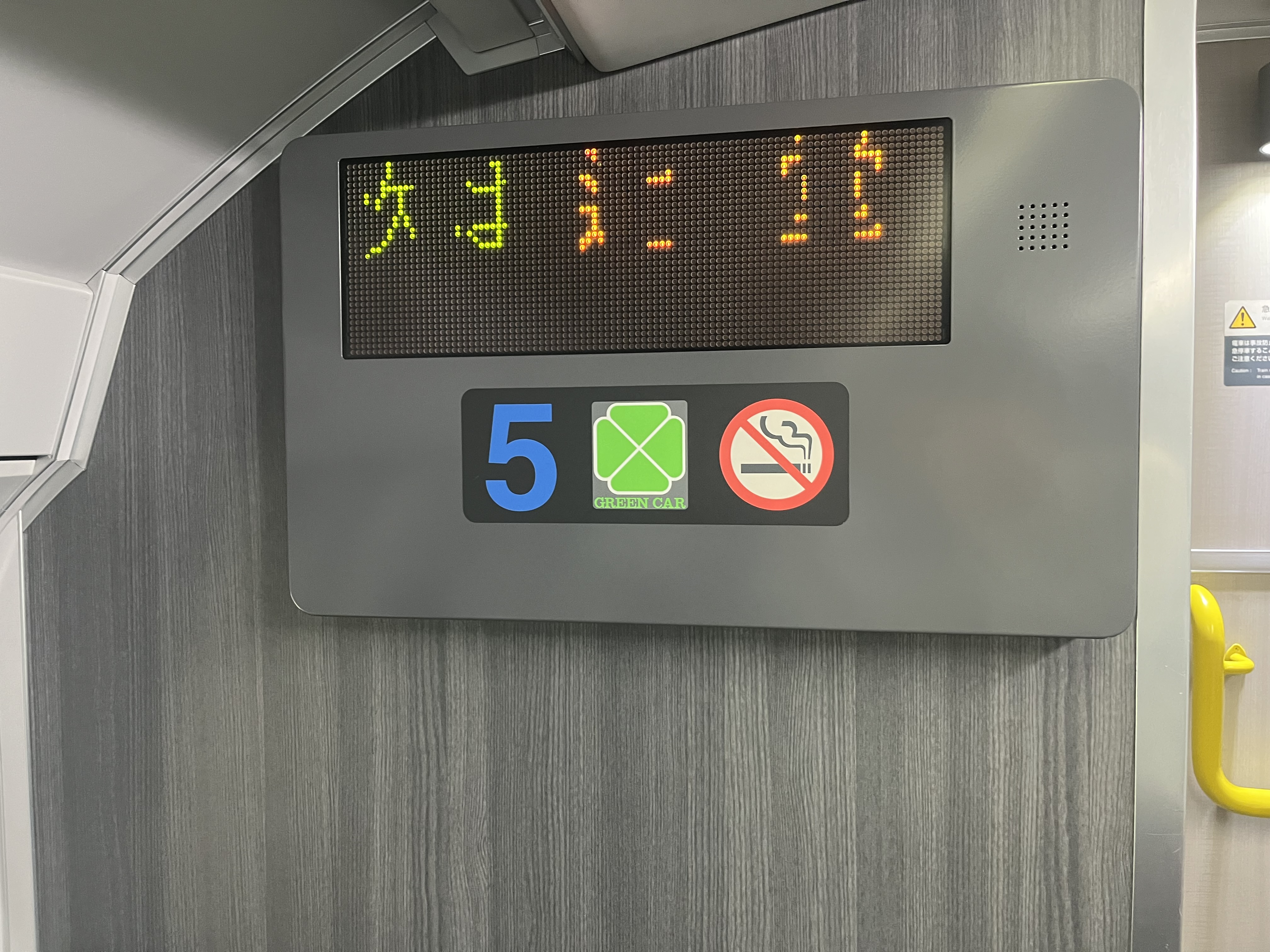
Green car passenger information display

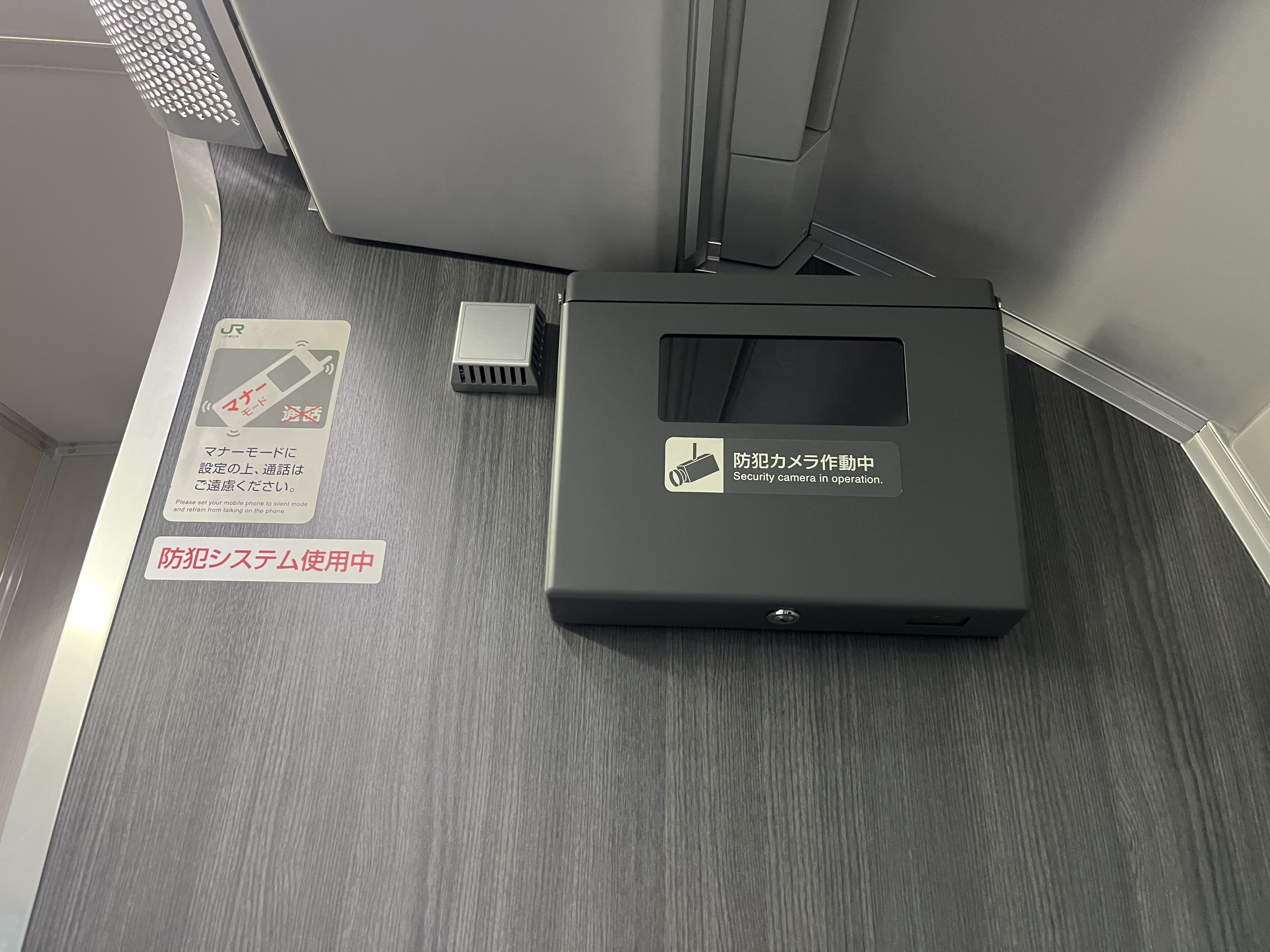
Security cameras in Green Cars

== E231-3000 series ==
E231-3000 series
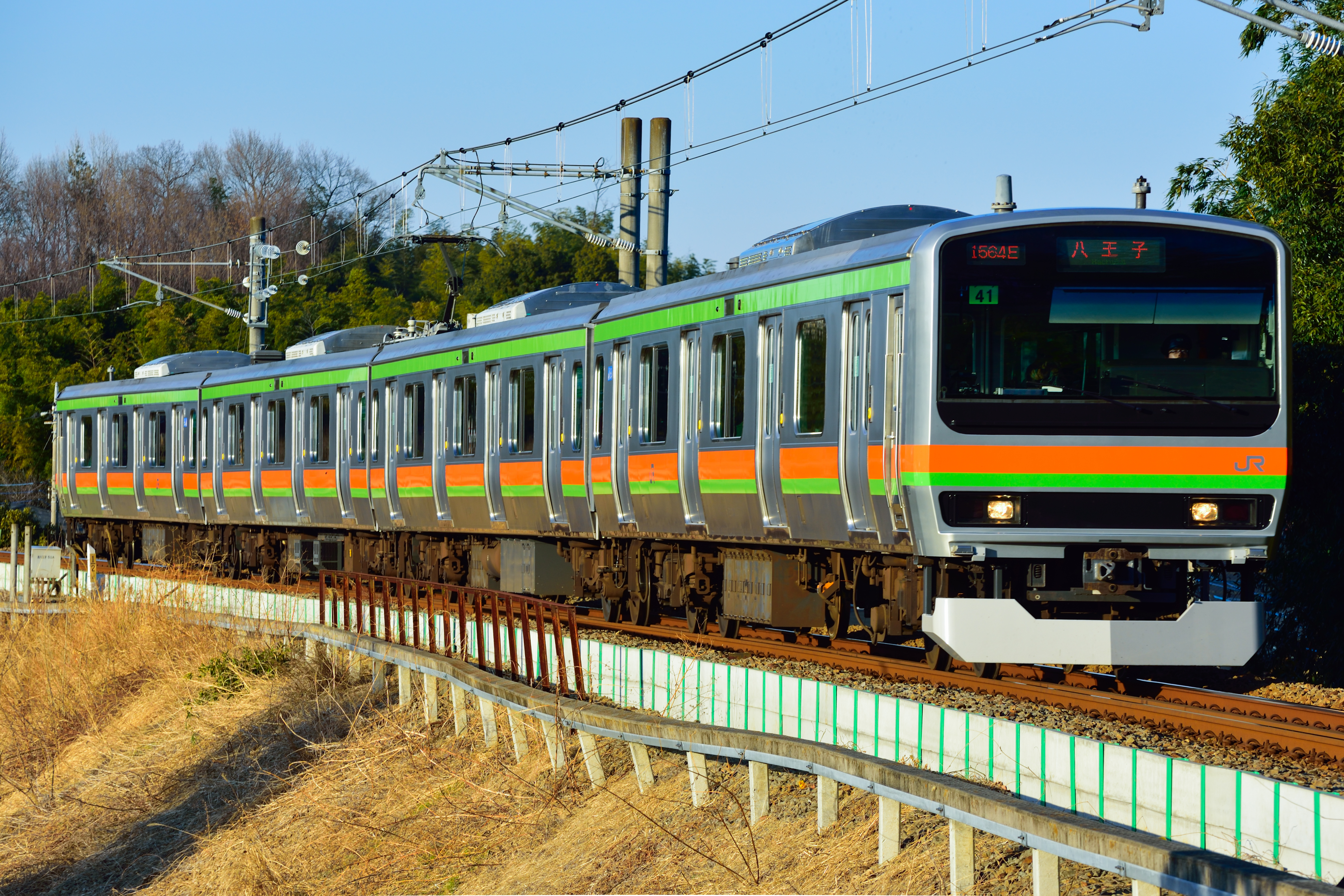
- A Hachikō/Kawagoe Line four-car set in March 2018
- Replaced: 205-3000 series, 209-3000 series, 209-3100 series
- Entered service: 19 February 2018
- Refurbished: 2017–2019 (converted from E231-0 series); 2020–2021 (modified for driver-only operation)
- Number built: 24 vehicles
- Number in service: 24 vehicles (6 sets)
- Formation: 4 cars per trainset
- Fleet numbers: 41–46
- Operator: JR East
- Depot: Kawagoe
- Lines served: ■ Hachikō Line, Kawagoe Line

Specifications
- Car body construction: Stainless steel
- Width: 2,950 mm (9 ft 8 in)
- Doors: 4 pairs per side
- Electric system: 1,500 V DC overhead catenary
- Current collection: PS33B pantograph
- Track gauge: 1,067 mm (3 ft 6 in)

From 2017, former E231-0 series ten-car sets based at Mitaka Depot for use on Chūō–Sōbu Line services were reformed and converted to become four-car E231-3000 series sets based at Kawagoe for use on Kawagoe Line and Hachikō Line services. The first set entered revenue service on the line on 19 February 2018.

Between June 2020 and September 2021, the trains were modified for driver-only operation (wanman (ワンマン; "one man")).

=== Lines served ===
- Hachikō Line (Hachiōji – Komagawa)
- Kawagoe Line (Komagawa – Kawagoe)

=== Formation ===
As of 8 October 2019, six four-car sets (41-46) are based at Kawagoe depot in Saitama and formed as shown below with two motored ("M") cars and two non-powered trailer ("T") cars.

	← Kawagoe Hachiōji →			
Car No.	4	3	2	1
Designation	Tc	M	M'	Tc'
Numbering	KuHa E231-3000	MoHa E231-3000	MoHa E230-3000	KuHa E230-3000

- Car 3 has one PS33B single-arm pantograph.
- Cars 1 and 4 have a wheelchair space.

=== Former set/car identities ===
The former identities of the E231-3000 series sets are as follows.

Set No.	Car numbers				Former set No.	Former car numbers			
41	KuHa E231-3001	MoHa E231-3001	MoHa E230-3001	KuHa E230-3001	B5	KuHa E231-5	MoHa E231-10	MoHa E230-10	KuHa E230-5
42	KuHa E231-3002	MoHa E231-3002	MoHa E230-3002	KuHa E230-3002	B6	KuHa E231-6	MoHa E231-12	MoHa E230-12	KuHa E230-6
43	KuHa E231-3003	MoHa E231-3003	MoHa E230-3003	KuHa E230-3003	B7	KuHa E231-7	MoHa E231-14	MoHa E230-14	KuHa E230-7
44	KuHa E231-3004	MoHa E231-3004	MoHa E230-3004	KuHa E230-3004	B8	KuHa E231-8	MoHa E231-16	MoHa E230-16	KuHa E230-8
45	KuHa E231-3005	MoHa E231-3005	MoHa E230-3005	KuHa E230-3005	B16	KuHa E231-16	MoHa E231-32	MoHa E230-32	KuHa E230-16
46	KuHa E231-3006	MoHa E231-3006	MoHa E230-3006	KuHa E230-3006	B17	KuHa E231-17	MoHa E231-34	MoHa E230-34	KuHa E230-17

== Accidents ==
On the evening of 5 August 2023, a Tokaido Line service led by E231-1000 series set S-14 struck a utility pole near Ofuna and lost power, reportedly due to getting caught by an overhead wire and pulling the pole. The accident resulted in four people, including the driver, sustaining minor injuries. The lead car of the set was damaged, and 1,500 passengers were evacuated after two hours. Service was restored on the morning of 6 August.

== See also ==
- E233 series, successor
- E331 series, experimental articulated train
- E531 series, dual-voltage derivative
- Sotetsu 10000 series, an E231 series derivative
- Toei 10-300 series, an E231 series derivative
- Tokyu 5000 series, an E231 series derivative
- SP1900 EMU, an MTR (ex-KCR) train type based on E231 series technology
- Nankai 8000 series, partly using same parts as E231
