= 103 series =

Japanese train type

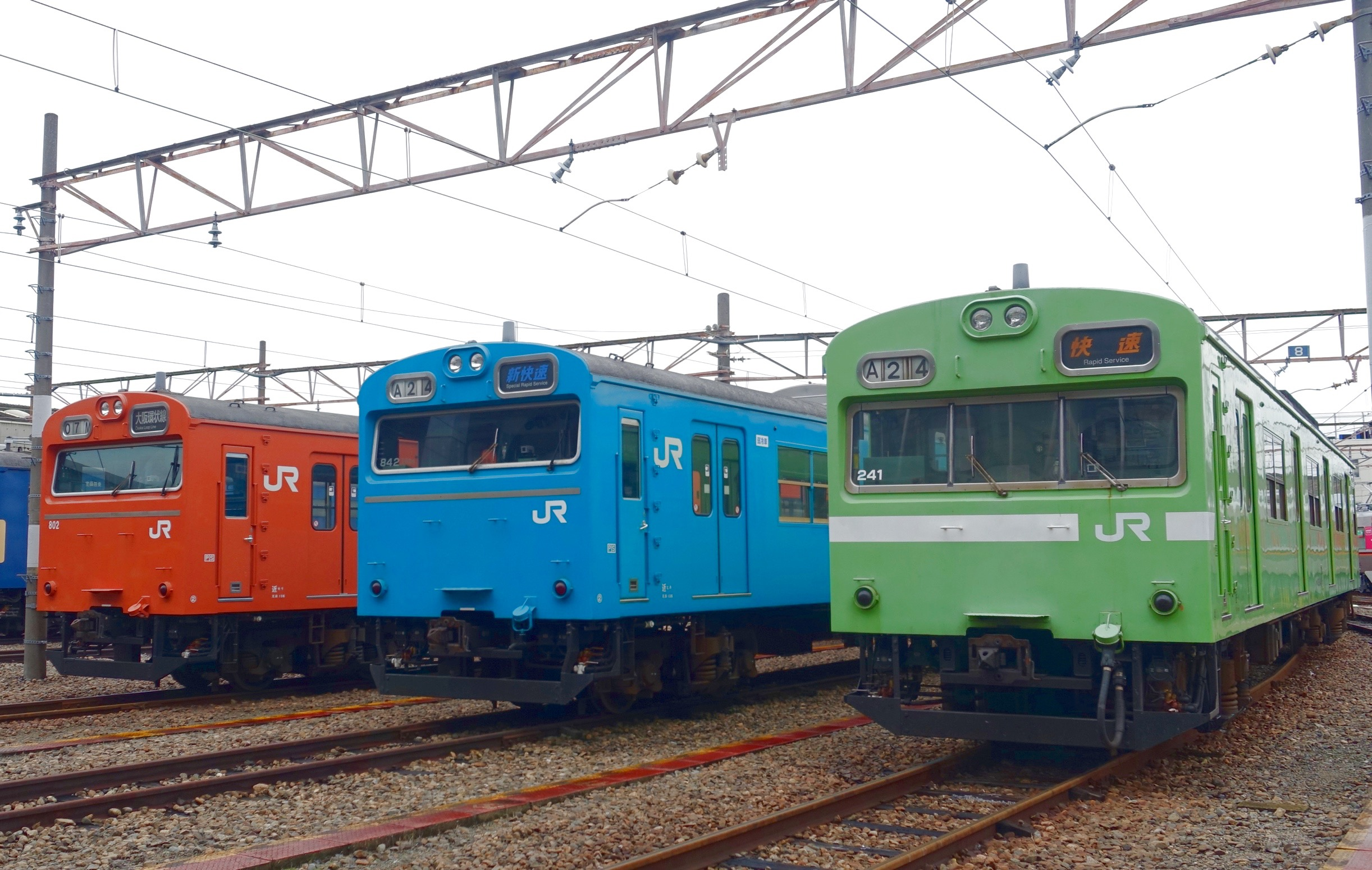
- JR West 103 series trains in various liveries at Suita Depot in October 2017
- In service: 1963–present
- Manufacturers: Hitachi, Kawasaki Heavy Industries, Kinki Sharyo, Kisha Seizo, Nippon Sharyo, Teikoku Sharyo, Tokyu Car Corporation, Toshiba
- Replaced: 101 series, KiHa 35, KiHa 37, KiHa 40, KiHa 47, KiHa 58
- Constructed: 1963–1984
- Entered service: December 1963
- Refurbished: 1996–2005 (for selected trains)
- Scrapped: 1986–
- Number built: 3,447 vehicles
- Number in service: 63 vehicles (as of 2019)
- Number preserved: 7 vehicles
- Number scrapped: 3,311 vehicles
- Successor: 201 series, 203 series, 205 series, 209 series, 223 series, 225 series, 227 series, E231 series, 305 series, 313 series, 323 series
- Formation: 2/3/4/5/6/7/8/10 cars per trainset
- Operators: ■ JNR (1964–1987); ■ JR East (1987–2009); ■ JR Central (1987–2001); ■ JR West (1987–Present); ■ JR Kyushu (1987–Present); KRL Jabodetabek (2004–2016)
- Depots: Hineno; Morinomiya; Nara; Aboshi; Hiroshima; Karatsu; Depok
- Line served: Various

Specifications
- Car body construction: Steel
- Car length: 20,000 mm (65 ft 7 in)
- Width: 2,800 mm (9 ft 2 in)
- Height: 3,935 mm (12 ft 10.9 in)
- Doors: 4 pairs per side
- Maximum speed: 100 km/h (62 mph)
- Traction system: Resistor control
- Power output: 440 kW (590 hp) per car with motors
- Acceleration: 2.0 km/(h⋅s) (1.2 mph/s)
- Deceleration: 5.0 km/(h⋅s) (3.1 mph/s)
- Electric system: 1,500 V DC overhead catenary
- Current collection: Pantograph
- Bogies: DT33, TR201, TR212, TR64 or DT21T (103-3000 series and converted from 101 series)
- Braking systems: Dynamic brake, Electro-pneumatic brake, Hand brake
- Safety systems: ATS-B, ATS-P, ATS-SK, ATS-SW, ATC-3, ATC-4, ATC-6, ATC-9
- Track gauge: 1,067 mm (3 ft 6 in)

The 103 series (103系, 103-kei) is a DC electric multiple unit (EMU) commuter train type introduced in 1963 by Japanese National Railways (JNR), and currently operated by West Japan Railway Company (JR West) and Kyushu Railway Company (JR Kyushu). They were also operated by East Japan Railway Company (JR East) and Central Japan Railway Company (JR Central).

Some former JR East sets were also sold for second hand use in Indonesia, where they operated on the KRL Jabodetabek system in Jakarta between 2004 and 2016.

== Operations ==
=== JR East ===
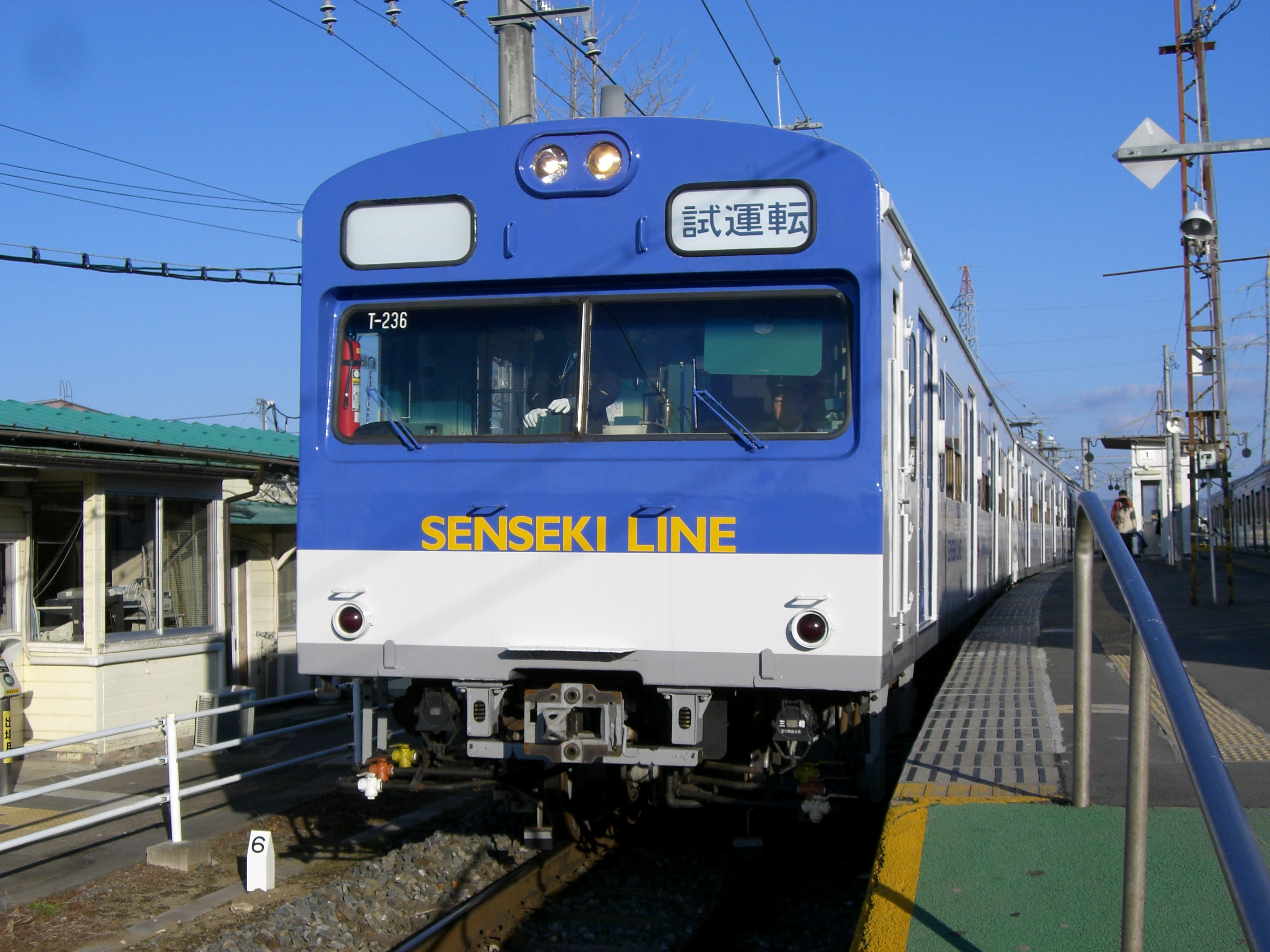
Last remaining 103 series set on the Senseki Line, in January 2007

JR East has previously operated a large number of 103 series sets on the following lines.

- Chūō Line (Rapid) (1973–1983; and then also used on the Diamond anniversary (75th anniversary) celebration of Mitaka Station in June 2005)
- Chūō-Sōbu Line (1979–2001; 1971–2003 for Tokyo Metro Tozai Line through-running services)
- Hachikō Line (1996–2005)
- Jōban Line (1971–1986 for Chiyoda Line through-running services; 1967–2006 for Joban Line Rapid and Narita-Abiko Line through service)
- Kawagoe Line (1985–2005)
- Keihin-Tōhoku Line (1965–1998)
- Keiyō Line (1986–2005)
- Musashino Line (1980–2005)
- Nambu Line (1982–2004)
- Ōme Line (1976–2002)
- Akabane Line (now Saikyo Line) (1978–1990)
- Senseki Line (1979–2004; 2006–2009)
- Tsurumi Line (1990–2005)
- Yamanote Line (1963–1988)
- Yokohama Line (1972–1989)

A single four-car 103 series set remained in use by JR East on the Senseki Line in the Sendai area between November 2006 up until 21 October 2009.

=== JR Central ===
JR Central has formerly used 103 series sets on Chuo Main Line services in the Nagoya area, but these were subsequently replaced by 211 series and 313 series trains.

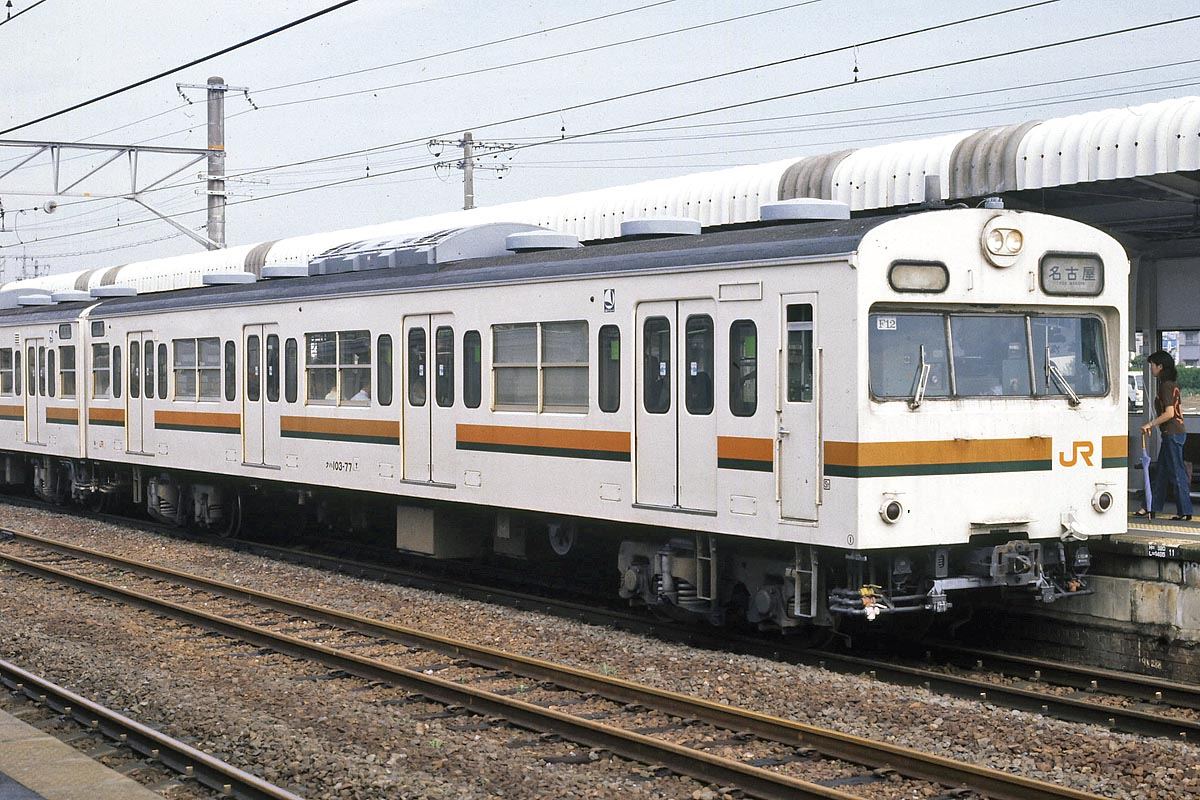
A 103 series set on June 26, 1999

=== JR-West ===
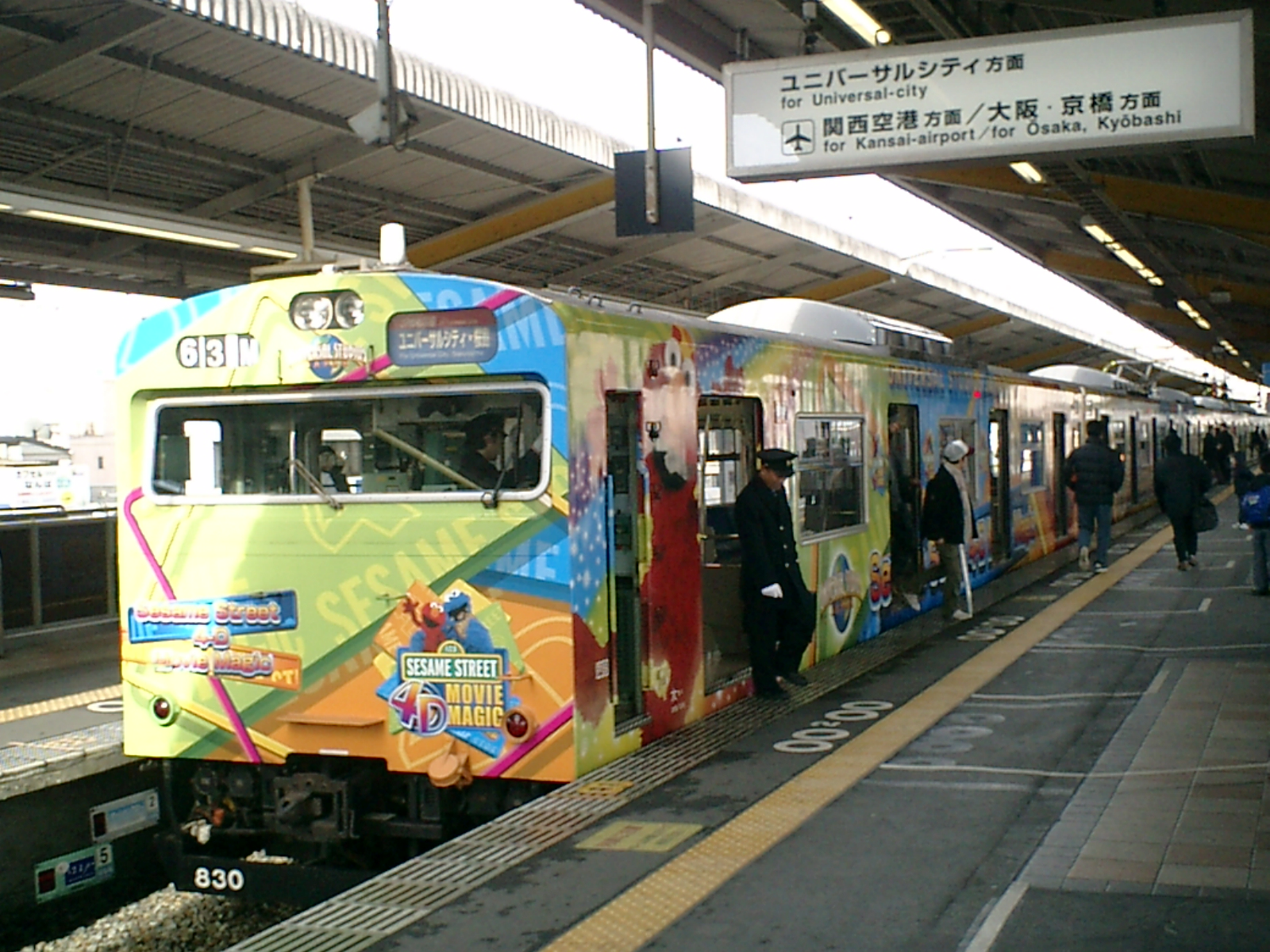
A JR-West refurbished set in USJ promotional livery in December 2005

A 103 series train on the Nara Line, 2015

JR-West continues to operate a large number of 103 series sets, many of which have received extensive life-extension refurbishment. JR-West currently operates 103 series sets on the following lines. They were also used on the Osaka Loop Line until October 2017. As of 2024, there are 63 cars still in service.

- Sakurai Line
- Bantan Line
- Kakogawa Line

Previous Operations (JR West):

- Akō Line
- Kabe Line (1992 – March 2011)
- Kure Line (1992 – 15 March 2015)
- Osaka Loop Line (1969 – October 2017)
- Sakurajima Line (1969 – October 2017)
- Yamatoji Line (1969 – 25 January 2018)
- Wakayama Line (1970 – January 2018)
- Osaka Higashi Line (1969 – 25 January 2018)
- Hanwa Line (1968 – 16 March 2018)
- Nara Line (until 11 March 2022)
- Sanyō Main Line (Wadamisaki Branch Line) (until 17 March 2023)

=== JR Kyushu ===
JR Kyushu operated a fleet of nine 6-car 103 series sets on JR Chikuhi Line inter-running services onto the Fukuoka City Subway Airport Line beginning in 1982.

In 2015, six 6-car 305 series sets entered service and the 6-car 103 series sets were converted to 3-car sets and restricted to operating on Chikuhi Line services between Chikuzen-Maebaru and Nishi-Karatsu.

As of 2024, three 3-car trainsets remain in service.

- Chikuhi Line (1982–present)

== Overseas operations ==
Four former JR East 103 series 4-car units (Musashino Line sets KeYo 20, 21, 22, and 27) were shipped to Indonesia in 2004 to operate on the KRL Jabodetabek system in Jakarta.

- KuMoHa 103: 105, 153
- MoHa 103: 654, 752
- MoHa 102: 231, 321, 810, 2009
- KuHa 103: 359, 384, 597, 632, 815, 822
- SaHa 103: 210, 246

These cars retain their Japanese numbering.

As of November 2016, all 103 series have been withdrawn.

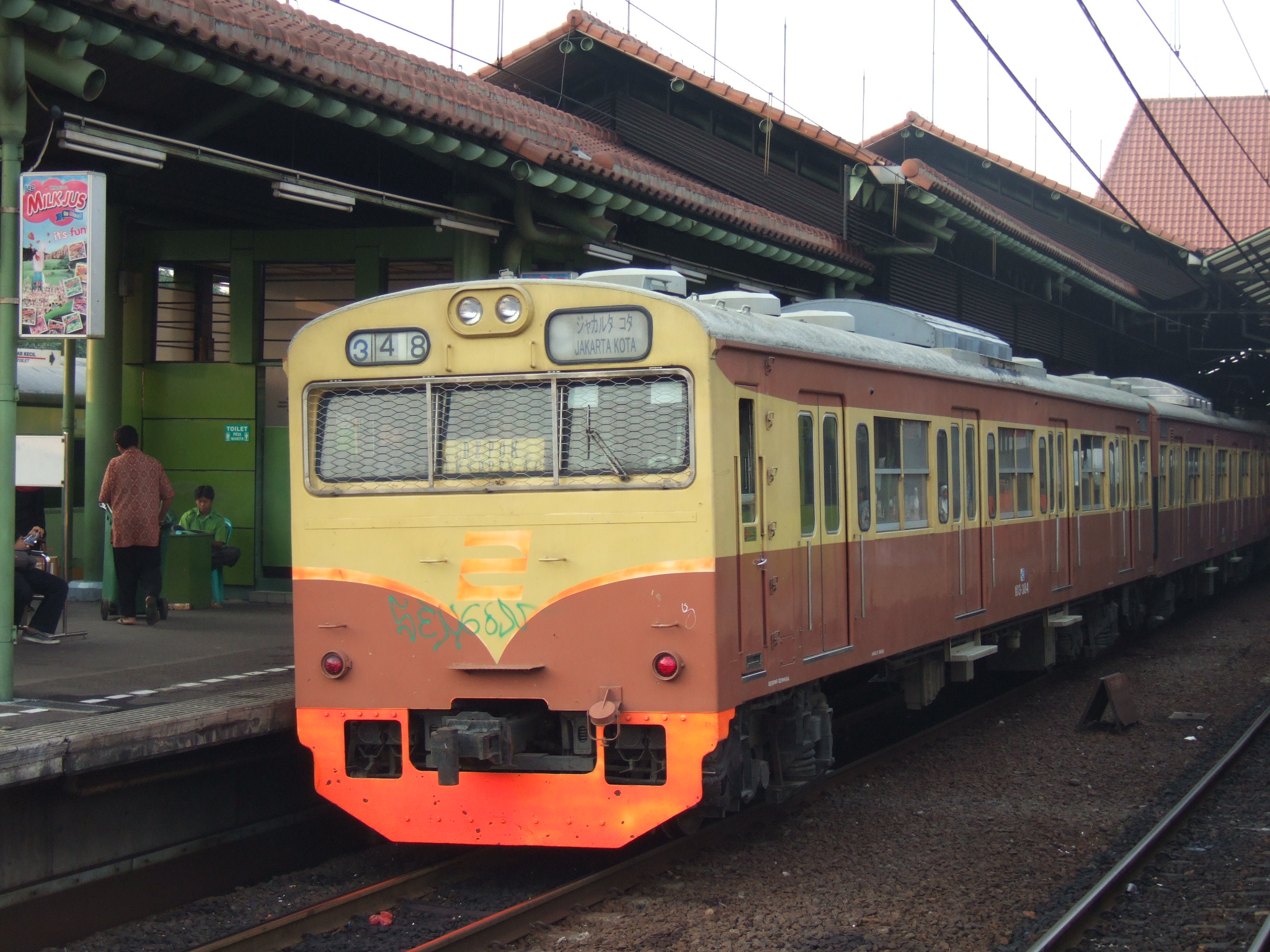
Former JR East 103 series EMU passing Gambir, July 2007

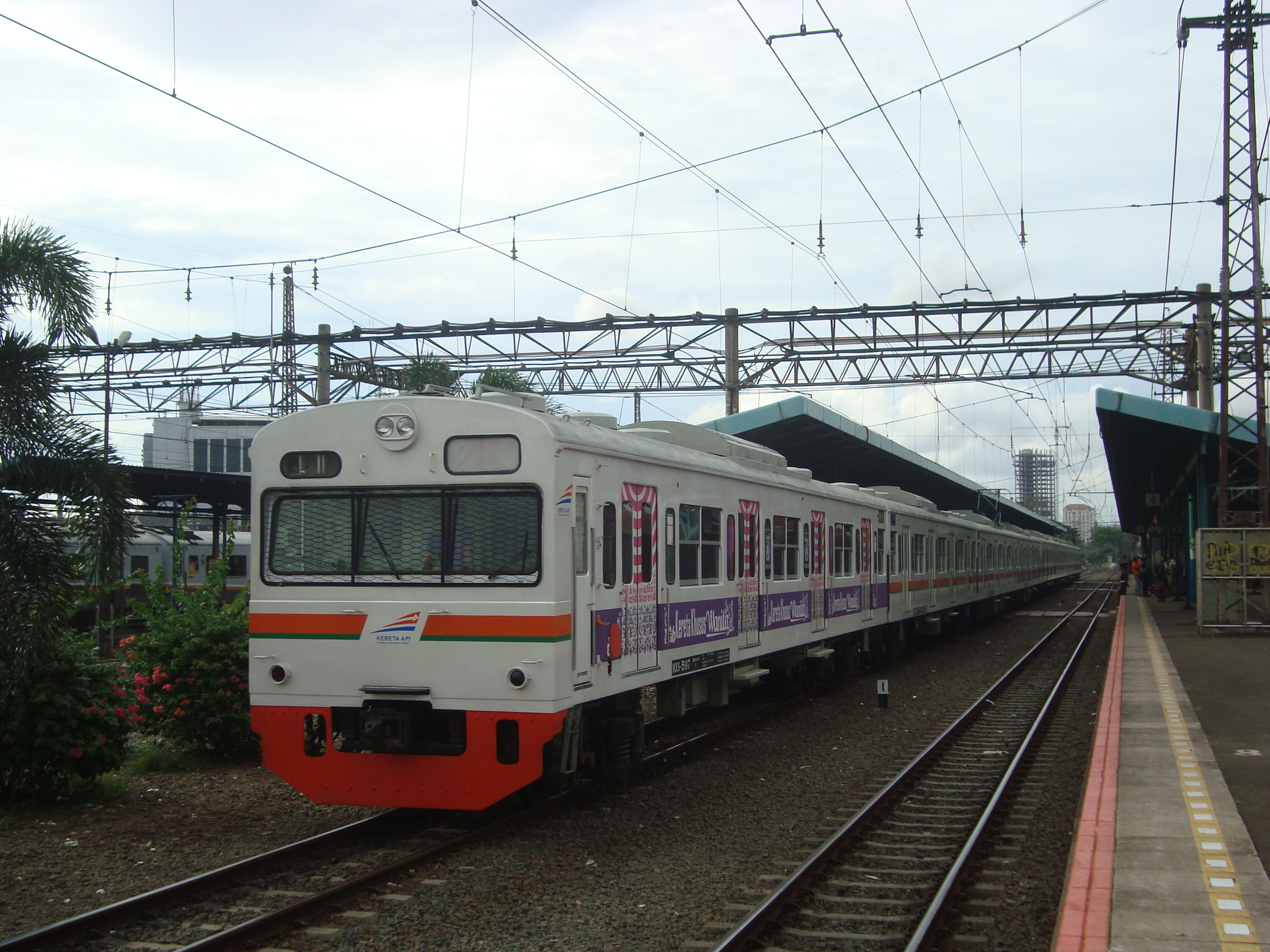
Former JR East set KeYo 21 in revised "JR Central" livery in Jakarta, December 2011

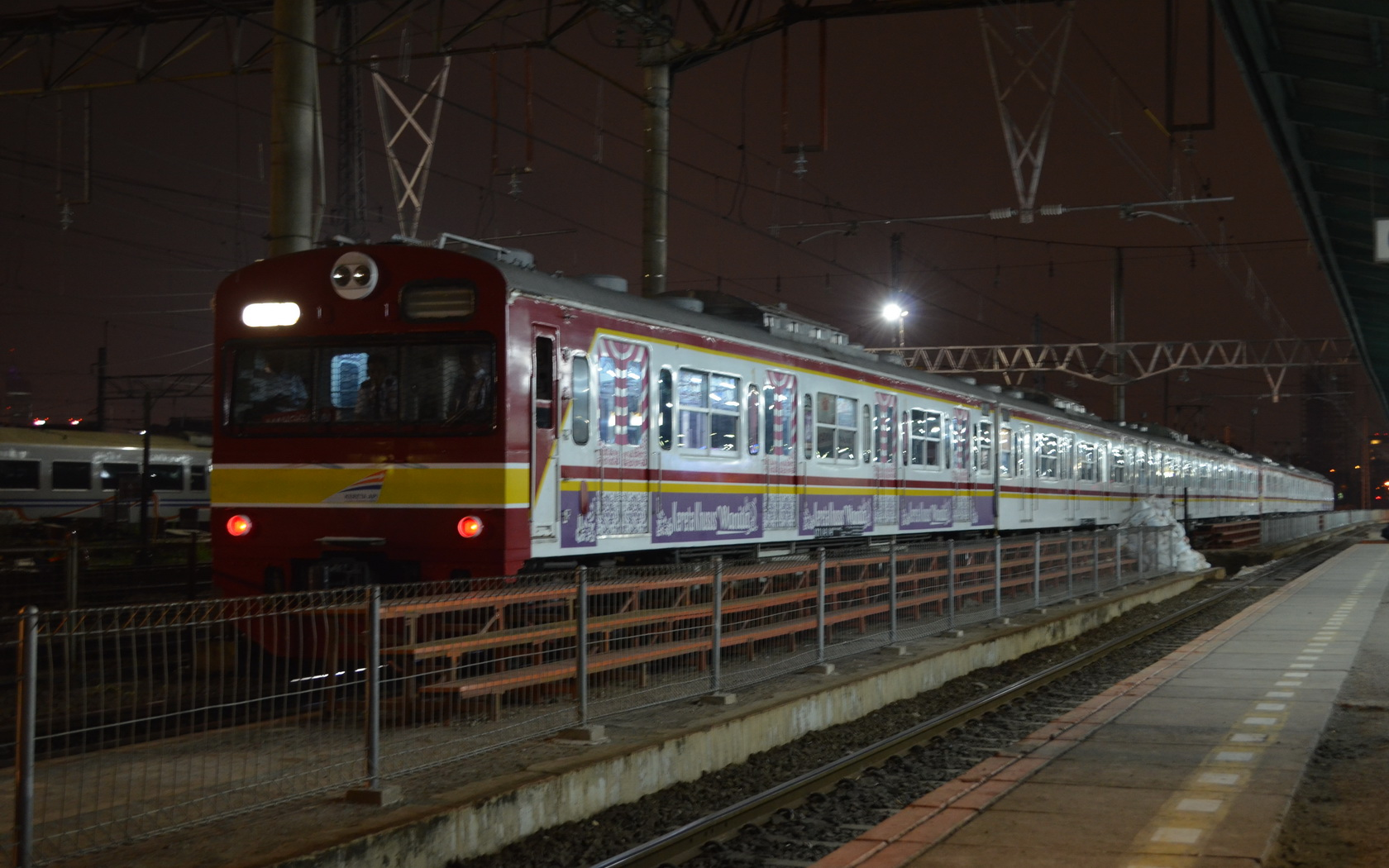
KeYo E20 with latest livery

== 103-0 series ==
103-0 series
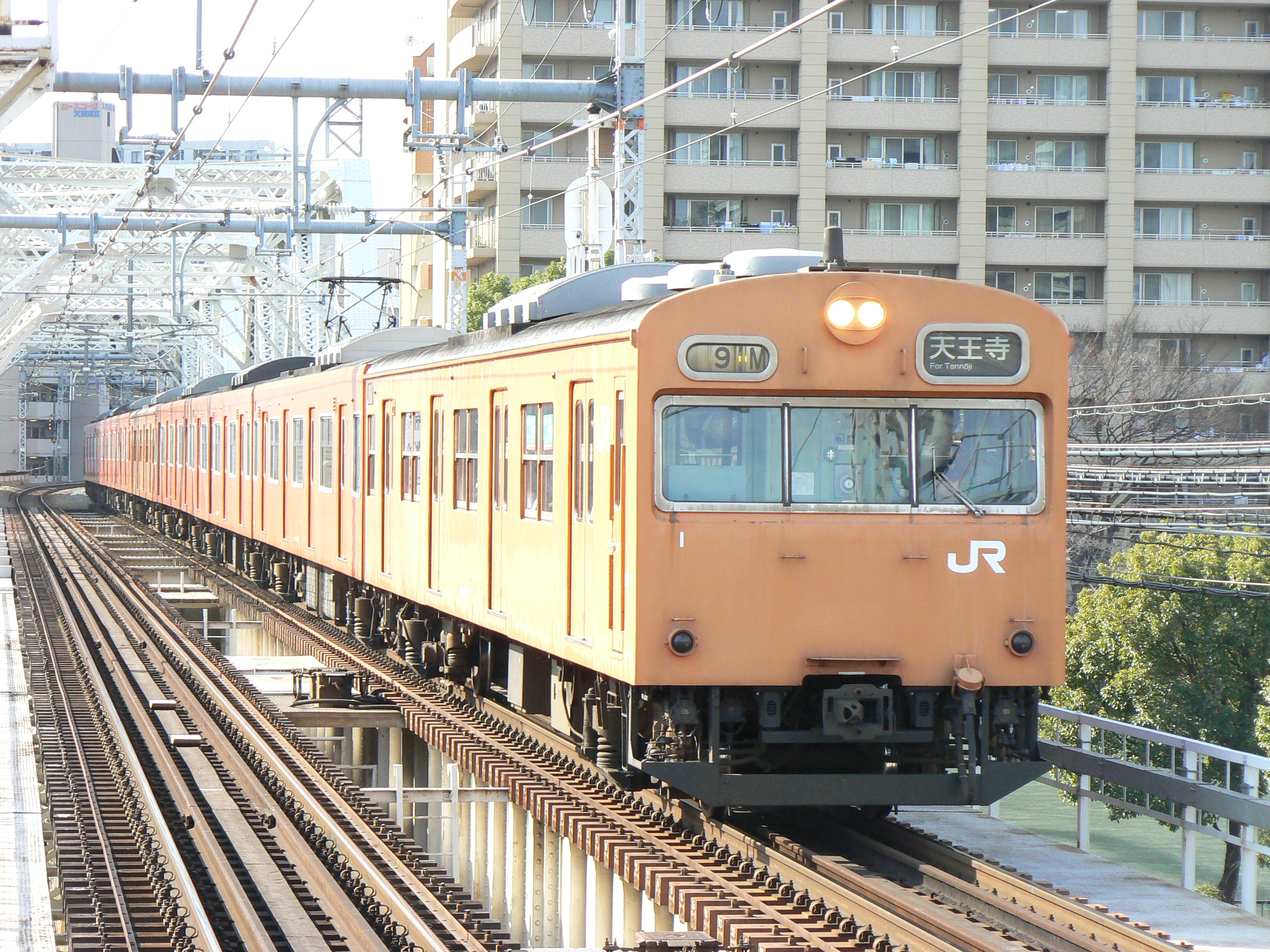
- JR West 103 series Osaka Loop Line, KuHa 103-1, January 2007
- In service: 1963–2023
- Manufacturers: Hitachi, Kawasaki Heavy Industries, Kinki Sharyo, Kisha Seizo, Nippon Sharyo, Teikoku Sharyo, Tokyu Car Corporation
- Replaced: 101 series, KiHa 35
- Constructed: 1963–1981
- Entered service: December 1963
- Refurbished: 1996–2005 (for selected trains)
- Scrapped: 1986–
- Number built: 3,198 vehicles
- Number in service: None (as of 2023)
- Number preserved: 7 vehicles
- Number scrapped: 3,153 vehicles (including Indonesia)
- Operators: JNR (1963–1987); JR East (1987–2009); JR Central (1987–1999); JR West (1987–2023); KRL Jabodetabek (2004–2016)
- Depots: Hineno; Morinomiya; Nara; Aboshi; Hiroshima; Depok
- Lines served: Chūō Line (Rapid), Chūō-Sōbu Line, Chuo Main Line, Jōban Line, Narita Line, Keihin-Tōhoku Line, Keiyō Line, Musashino Line, Nambu Line, Ōme Line, Saikyo Line, Senseki Line, Tsurumi Line, Yamanote Line, Yokohama Line, Akō Line, Kabe Line, Kure Line, Osaka Loop Line, Sakurajima Line, Yamatoji Line, Wakayama Line, Osaka Higashi Line, Hanwa Line, Sanyō Main Line, Sakurai Line, Nara Line, Wadamisaki Line, Jakarta Kota-Bogor Line, Jatinegara-Bogor Line

Specifications
- Car body construction: Steel
- Car length: 20,000 mm (65 ft 7 in)
- Width: 2,800 mm (9 ft 2 in)
- Height: 3,935 mm (12 ft 10.9 in)
- Doors: 4 pairs per side
- Maximum speed: 100 km/h (62 mph)
- Traction system: Resistor control, Thyristor Chopper, DDM-VVVF, IGBT-VVVF (test run only)
- Power output: 440 kW per car with motors
- Acceleration: 2.0 km/(h⋅s) (1.2 mph/s)
- Deceleration: 5.0 km/(h⋅s) (3.1 mph/s)
- Electric system: 1,500 V DC
- Current collection: overhead catenary
- Bogies: DT33, TR201, TR212, TR64
- Braking systems: Dynamic brake, Electro-pneumatic brake, Hand brake
- Safety systems: ATS-B, ATS-P, ATS-SK, ATS-SW, ATC-3, ATC-4, ATC-6, ATC-9
- Track gauge: 1,067 mm (3 ft 6 in)

The 103–0 series trains were built between 1963 and 1981. Built for JNR as an "upgraded" version of the 101 series, the 103 series has been widely used around Japan and has been manufactured in a multitude of different body styles and configurations.

Based on the earlier 101 series, the 103 series has been used on various commuter services since 1963. In fact, some 103 series cars were actually converted from 101 series cars. The 103 series was the main rolling stock used on urban commuter services for a time.

Some sets have been used for at least 50 years, and their age is starting to show; as such, their use on various lines is diminishing and they are being replaced by newer trains. For instance, the 103 series have been replaced by the newer 323 series on the Osaka Loop Line.

The sets have been manufactured in a multitude of different body styles, with additional body styles being created over the years. Older sets had body styles similar to the one used on the 101 series.

=== Prototype ===
This 8-car unit was built in 1963 without air-conditioning. The cars were withdrawn from service between 1988 and 1991.

- Moha 103: 901-902
- Moha 102: 901-902
- Kuha 103: 901-904

=== Standard series ===
These were built between 1964 and 1970. While not originally fitted with air-conditioning, most of the cars were fitted with air conditioning from 1975. The bogies of the trailer cars were changed from TR201 to TR212 for the cars built from 1968. Cars fitted with TR212 bogies feature disc brakes, because they needed to run on higher speeds on the Jōban and Hanwa Lines.

- KuMoHa 103: 1-155
- MoHa 103: 1-278
- MoHa 102: 1-433
- KuHa 103: 1-177 and 501-638 (TR212 bogies fitted: 115-177 and 617–638)
- SaHa 103: 1-305 (TR212 bogies fitted: 226–305)

=== Air-conditioned prototype ===
This single 10-car unit was built in 1970. It was equipped with various air conditioning units and tested on the Yamanote Line in Tokyo. It was subsequently modified to become a standard air-conditioned set in 1978. In 2000, four cars were scrapped at the Narashino Depot; the remaining six cars were scrapped at Keiyō Rolling Stock Center in 2005.

- MoHa 103: 279-281
- MoHa 102: 434-436
- KuHa 103: 178-179
- SaHa 103: 306-307

=== Sets without air-conditioning ===
Built during 1972 and 1973, these units were similar to the air-conditioned prototype but without air-conditioning. This type was used mainly in Osaka area. Most cars were fitted with air-conditioning from 1976.

- MoHa 103: 282-330 and 364-374
- MoHa 102: 437-486 and 520-530
- KuHa 103: 180-212
- SaHa 103: 308-323

=== Air-conditioned sets ===
Built in 1973, they were similar to the air-conditioned prototype. They were fitted with motorized destination blinds on both sides.

- MoHa 103: 331-413 (excluding 364–374)
- MoHa 102: 487-569 (excluding 520–530)
- KuHa 103: 213-268
- SaHa 103: 324-359

=== ATC equipped sets ===
Built between 1974 and 1980. The front end design was changed with the driver's cab raised so that an ATC signalling system could be included. Kuha 103 of this version was used in the Tokyo area only.

- MoHa 103: 414-713
- MoHa 102: 570-869
- KuHa 103: 269-796 (excluding 500–700), 798, 809, 816
- SaHa 103: 360-471

=== Raised driver's cab ===
Built between 1979 and 1984. The front end design was the same as the ATC-equipped sets, although this type was not fitted with ATC. Kuha 103-811 and 816 were converted to include ATC in 1984.

- MoHa 103: 714-793
- MoHa 102: 870-2050 (excluding 900–2000)
- KuHa 103: 797, 799-850 (excluding 809, 816, 845, 847, 849)
- SaHa 103: 472-503
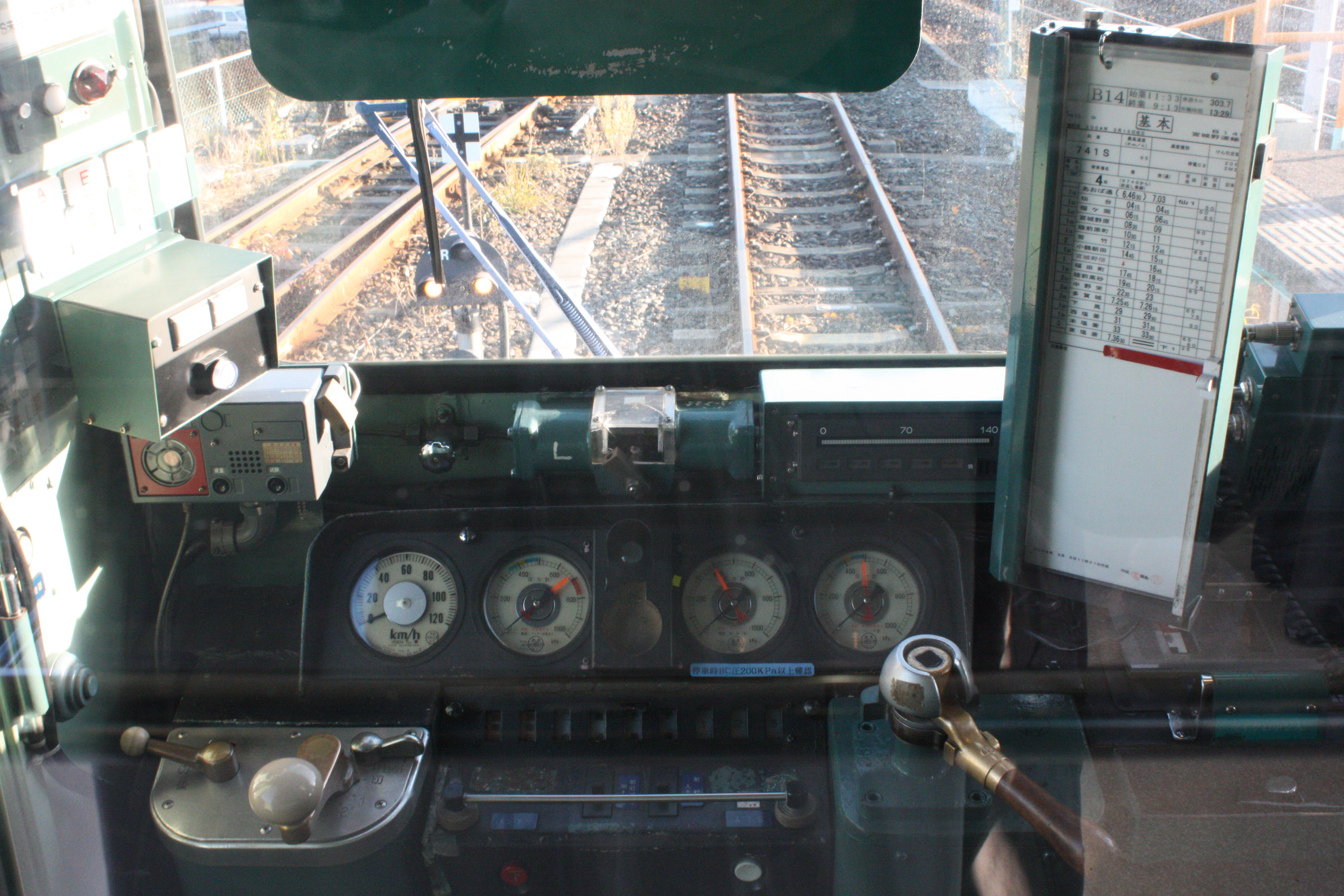
Driver's cab of KuHa 103-235 car (without ATC), November 2008

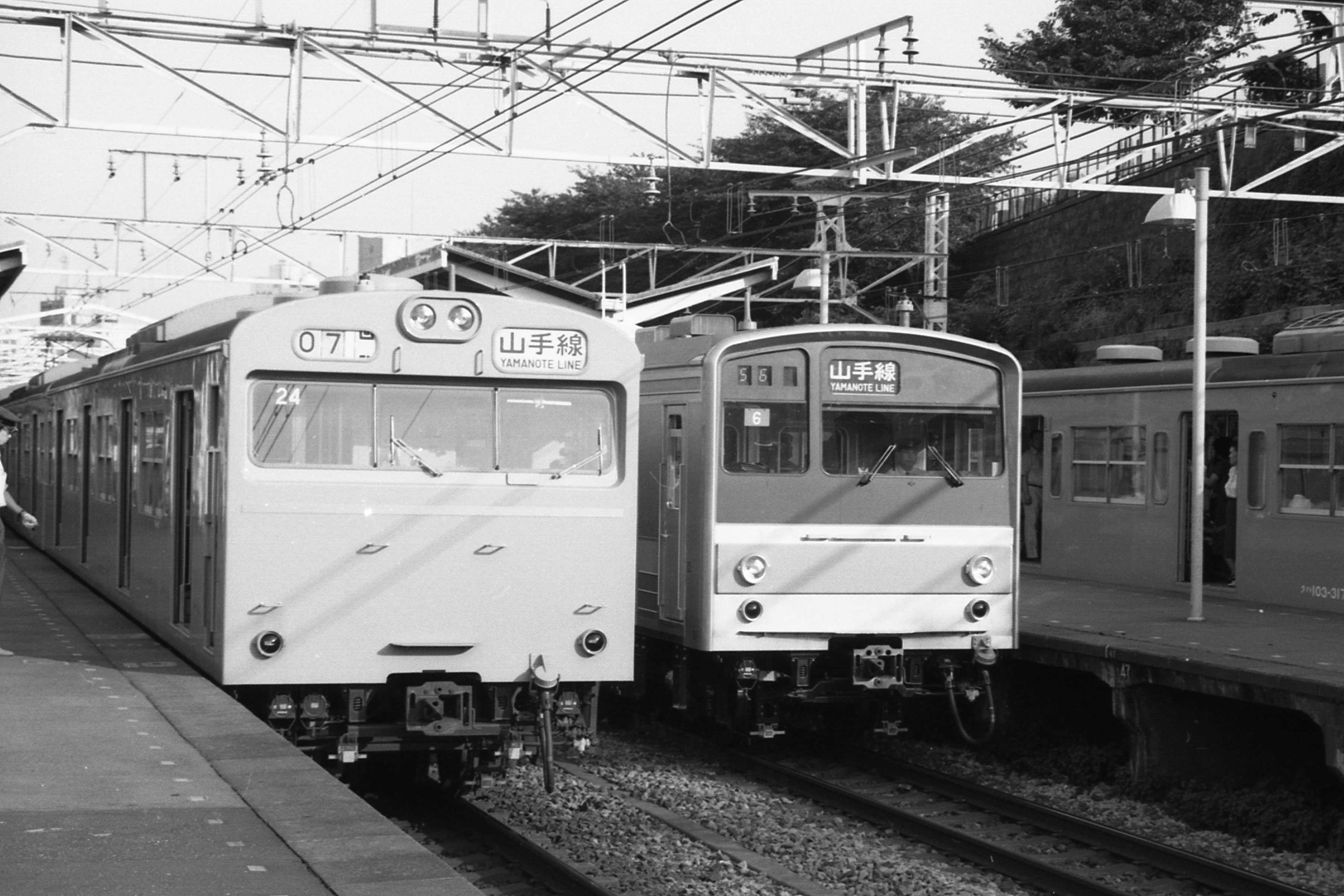
JNR 103 and 205 series Yamanote Line meet at Uguisudani station, February 1986.

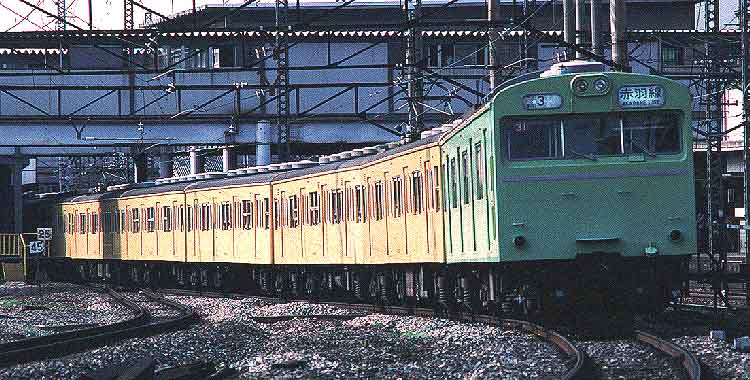
Akabane Line KuHa 103-273 car with air-conditioning coupled with non air-conditioned middle cars, 1979

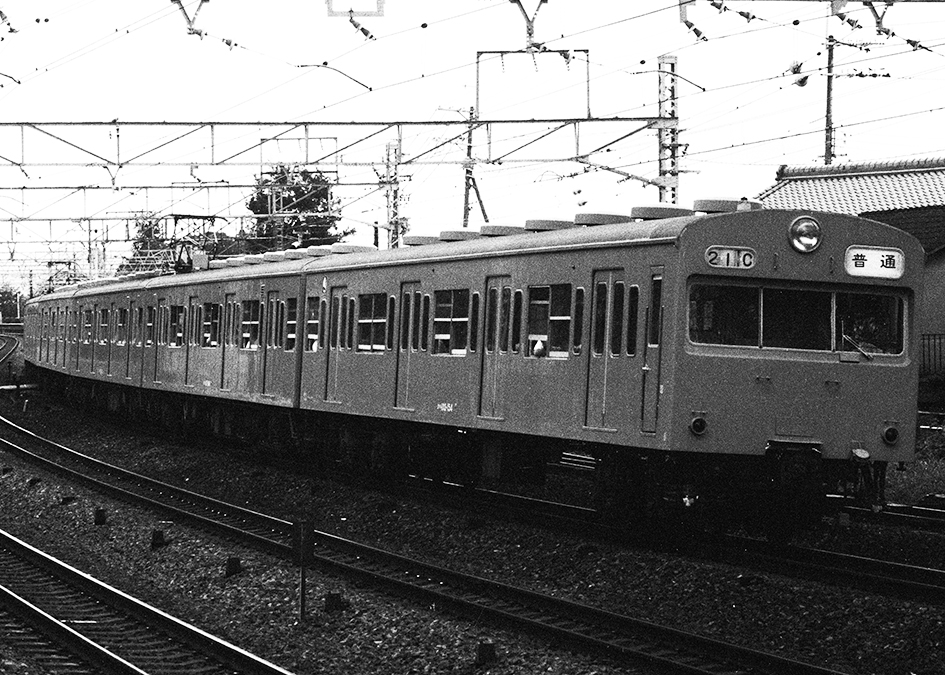
Biwako Line-JR Kyoto Line-JR Kobe Line KuHa 103-154 car without air-conditioning, 1983

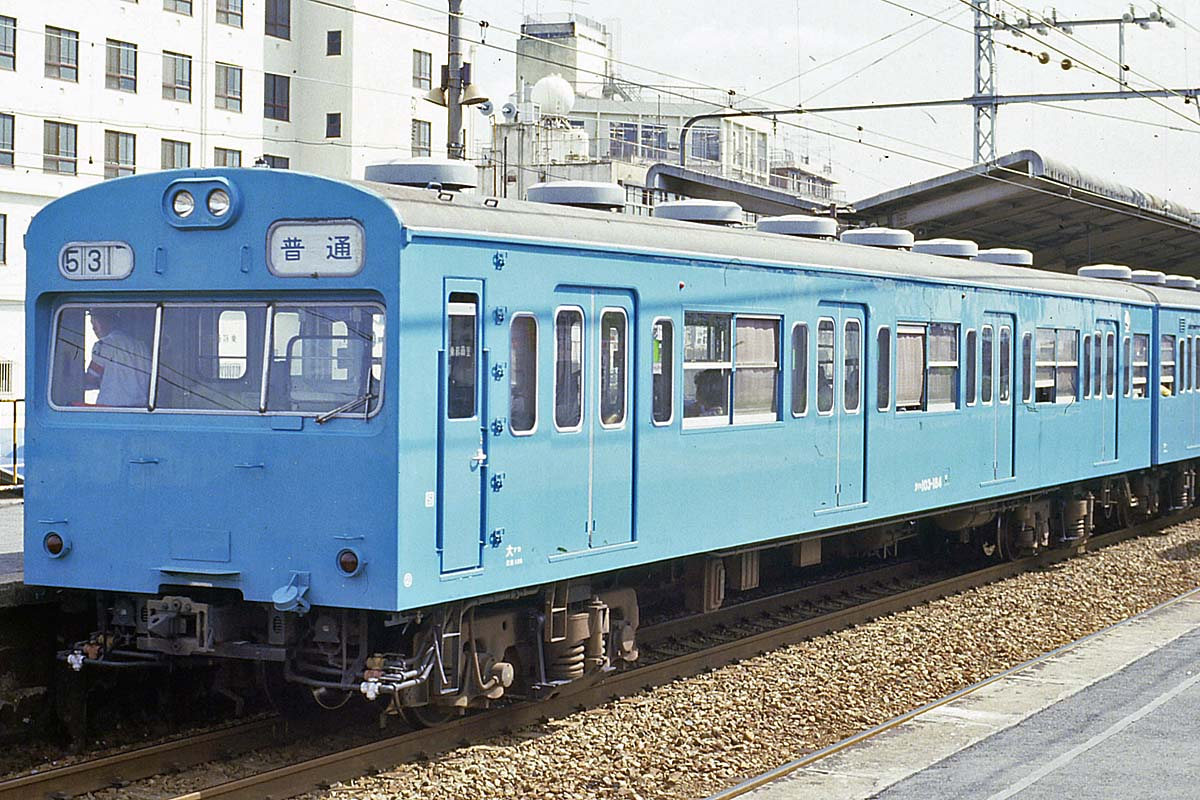
JR Kobe Line KuHa 103-184 car without air-conditioning, August 1983

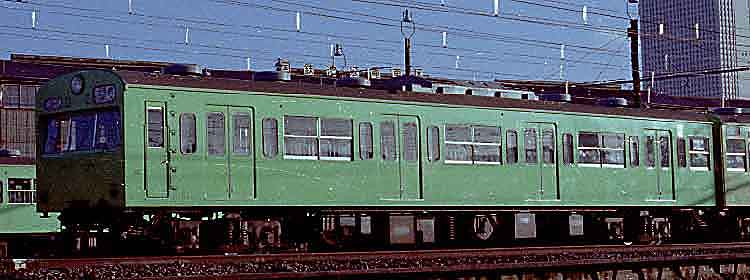
Yamanote Line air-conditioned prototype KuHa 103-178 car, October 1978

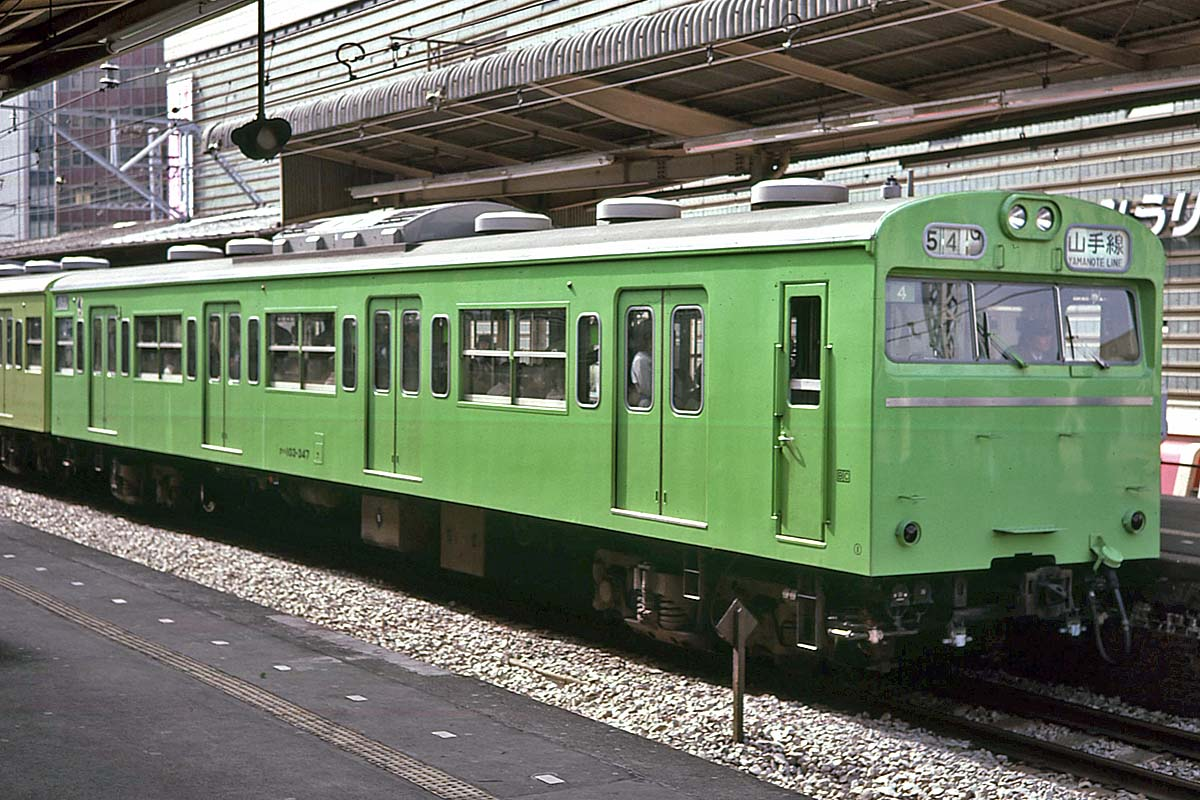
Yamanote Line ATC equipped KuHa 103-347 car, March 1985

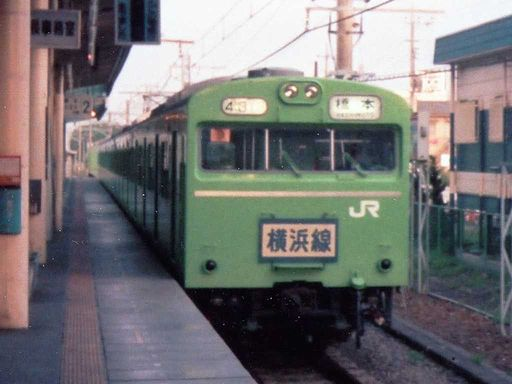
JR East Yokohama Line air-conditioned 103–0 series, circa 1988

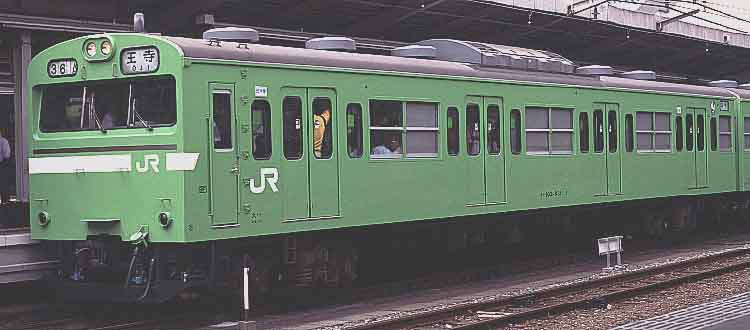
JR-West Yamatoji Line raised driver's cab KuHa 103-831 car, circa 1993

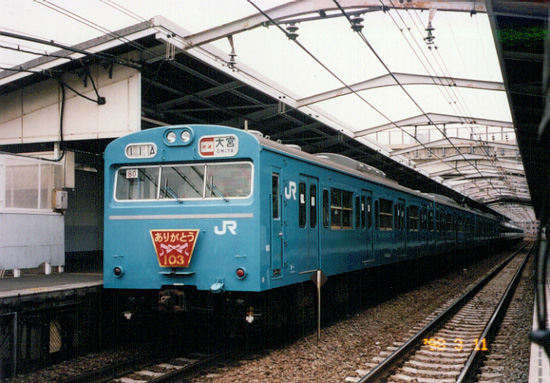
JR East Negishi Line air-conditioned 103–0 series, March 1998

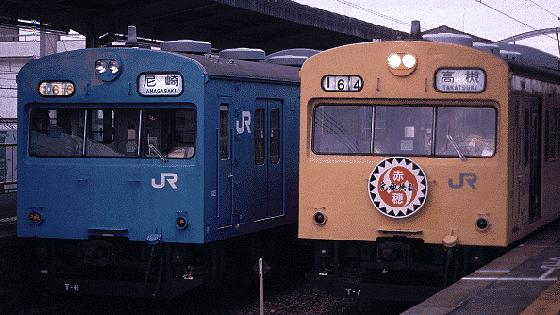
Two JR-West Fukuchiyama Line (left) and JR Kyoto Line air-conditioned 103–0 series, August 1999

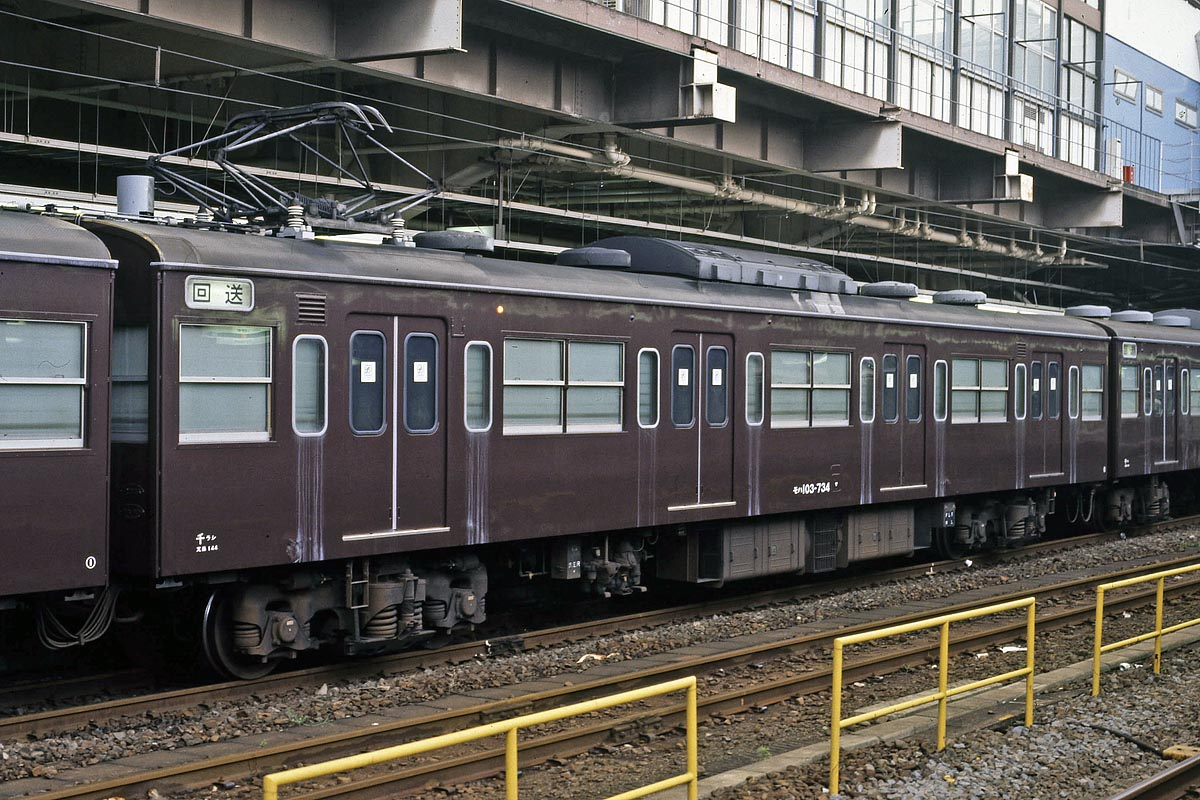
JR East MoHa 103-734 car in brown livery, August 1999

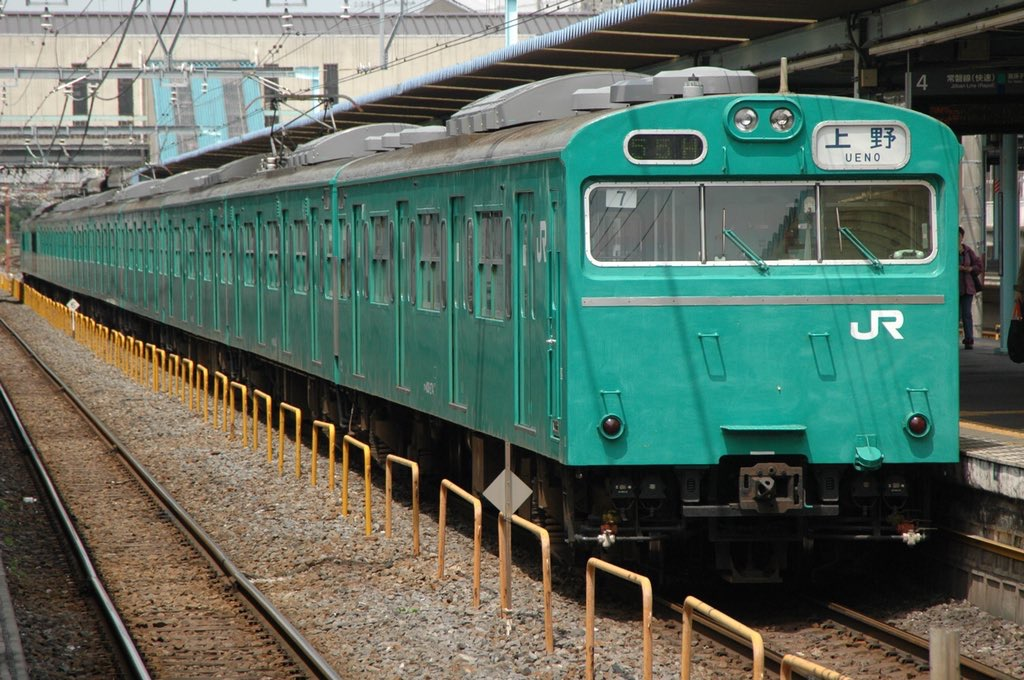
Jōban Line air-conditioned 103–0 series, April 2005

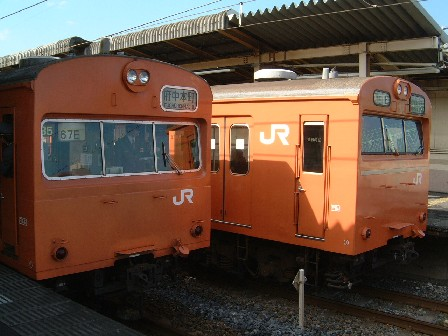
Musashino Line air-conditioned 103–0 series showing different driver's cab heights, August 2003

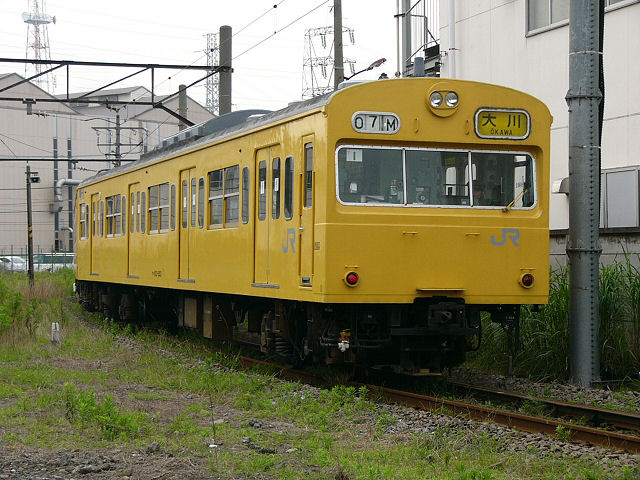
Tsurumi Line air-conditioned 103–0 series, June 2004

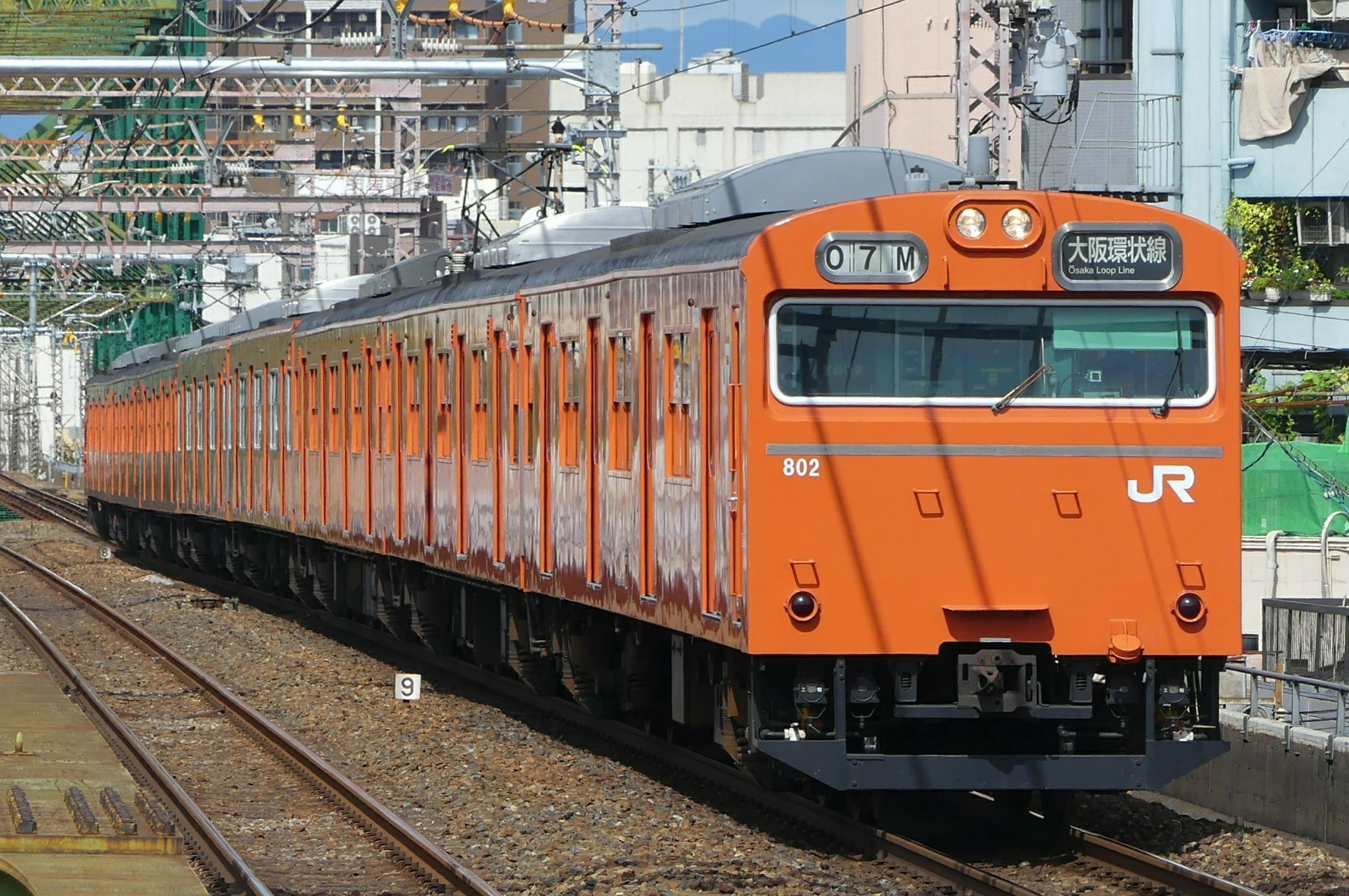
Osaka Loop Line air-conditioned KuHa 103-802 car, September 2017

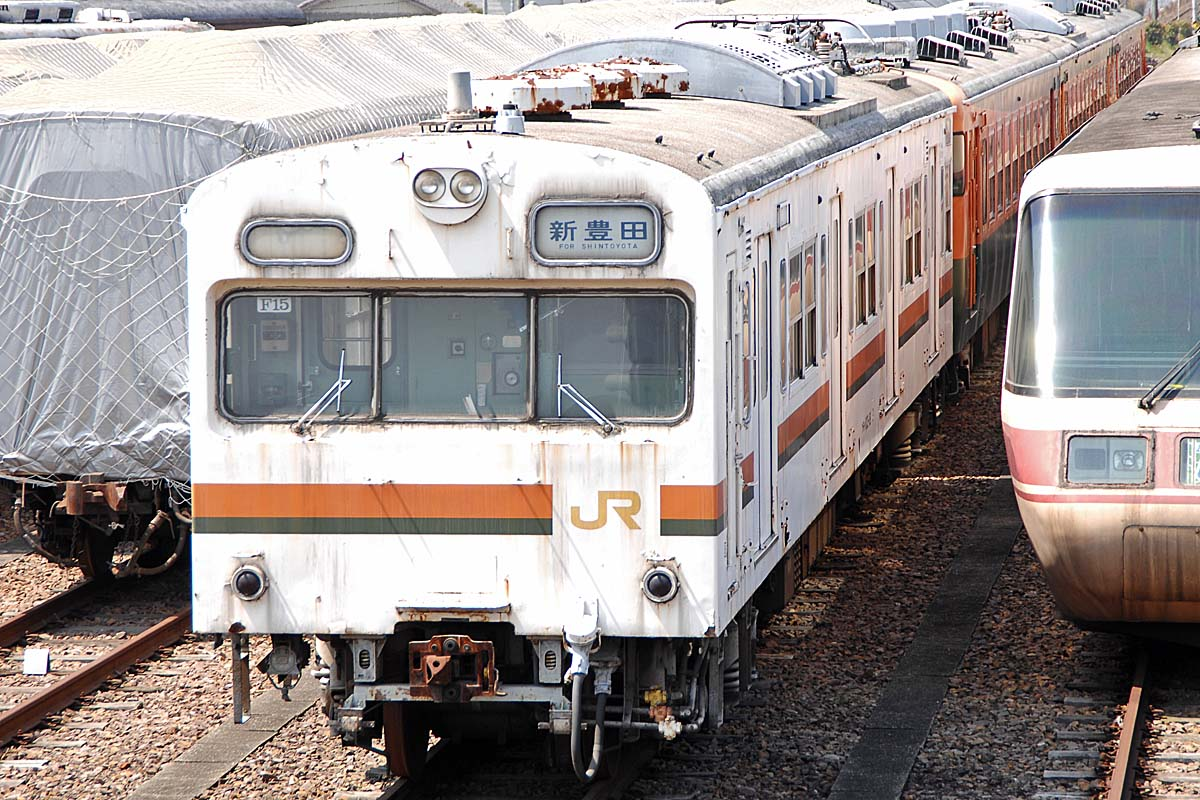
JR Central 103–0 series air-conditioned KuMoHa 103-18 car, April 2007

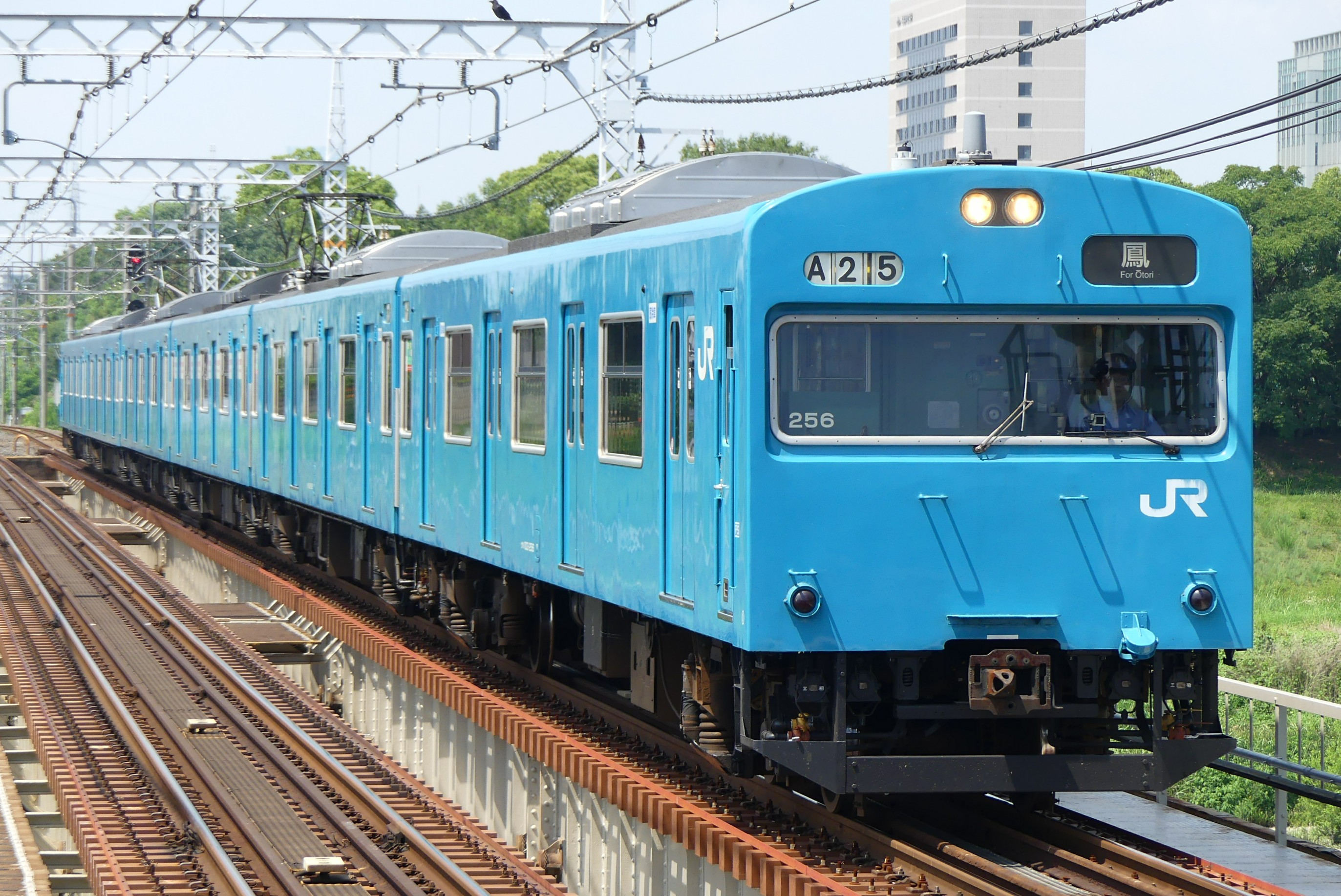
JR-West Hanwa Line 103–0 series air-conditioned car, July 2017

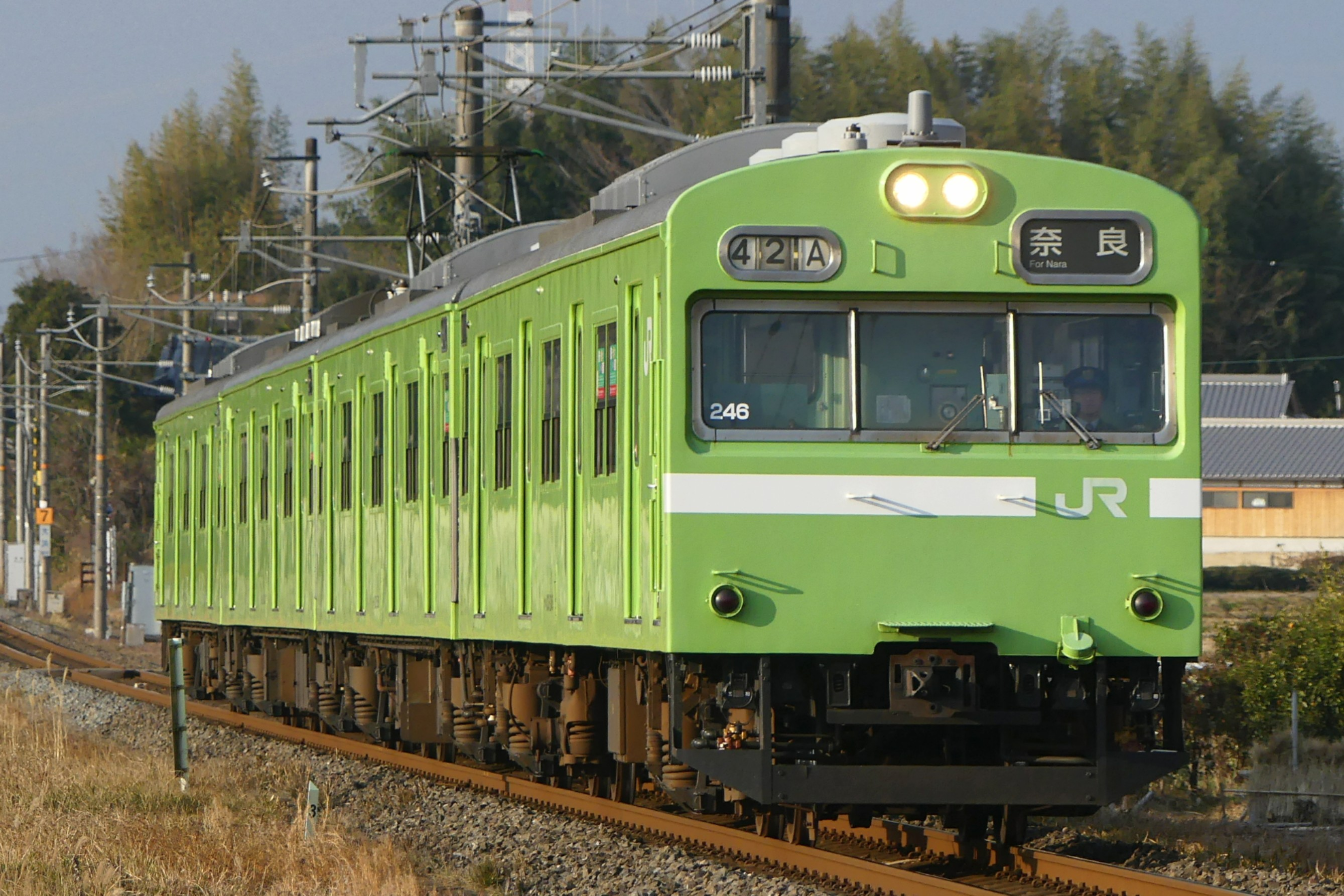
JR West 103 series on Nara Line local service, December 2017

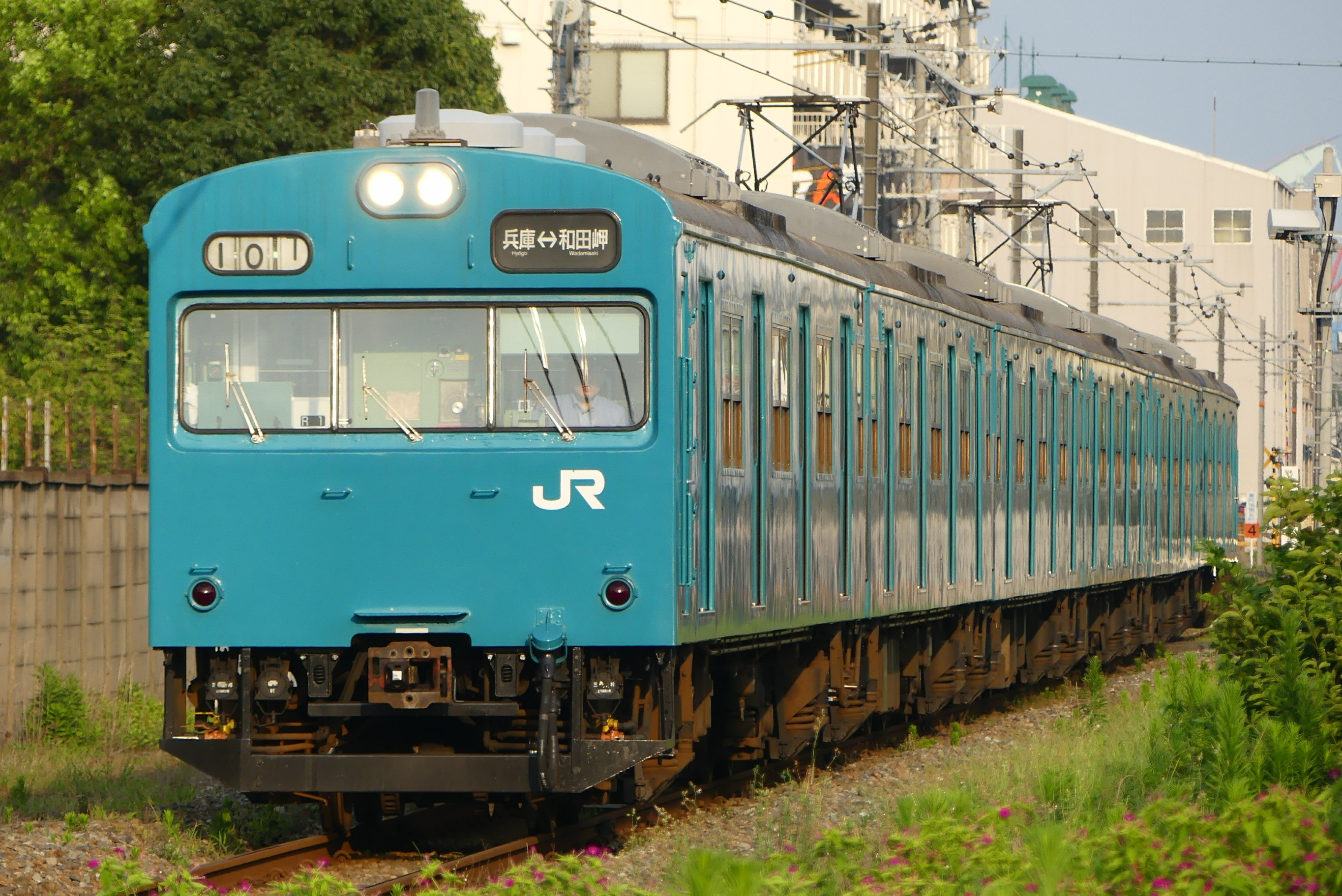
JR West 103 series train Wadamisaki Line local service, July 2017

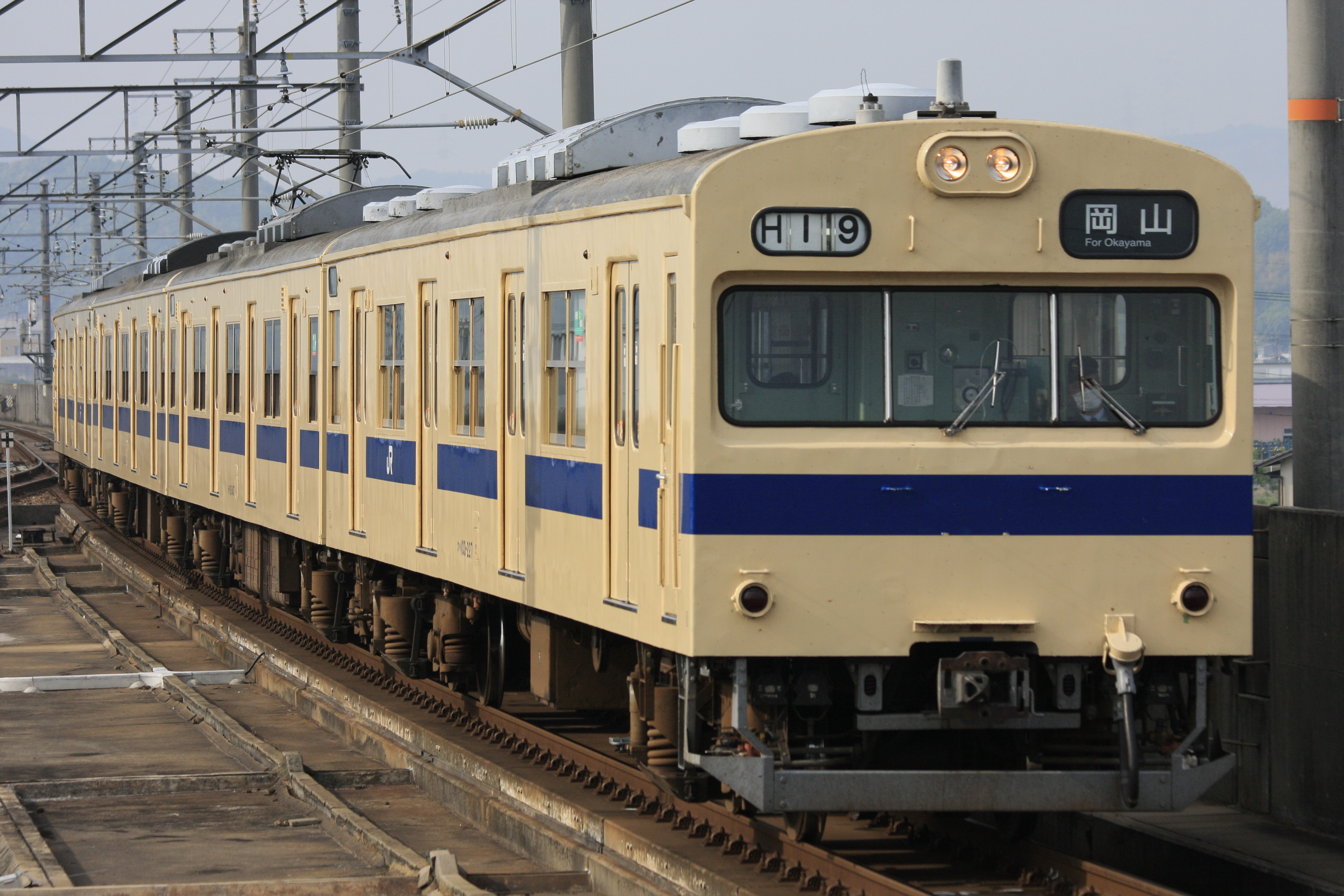
JR-West San'yō Main Line air-conditioned 103–0 series set H19, May 2009

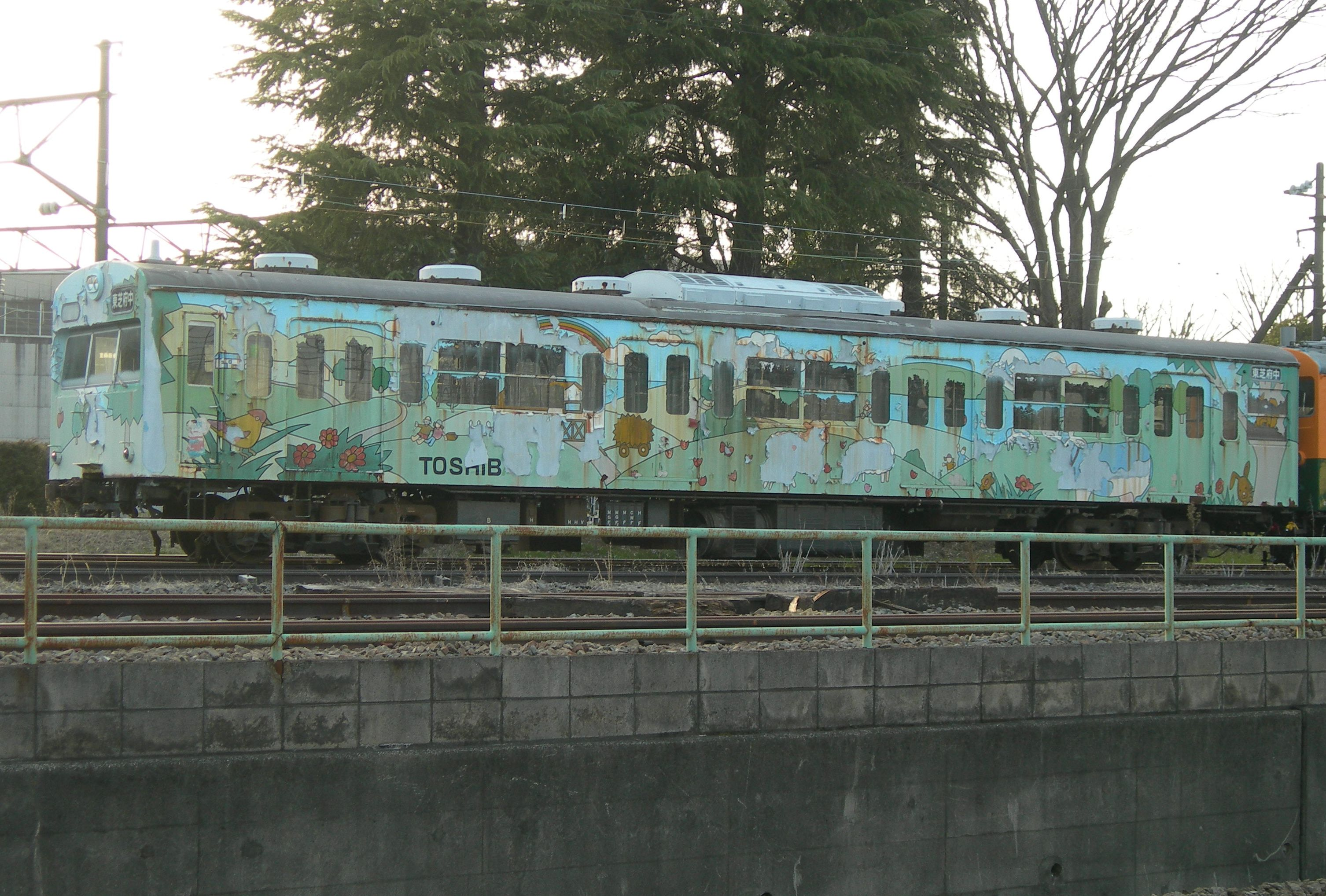
KuHa 103-525 test car owned by Toshiba, March 2010

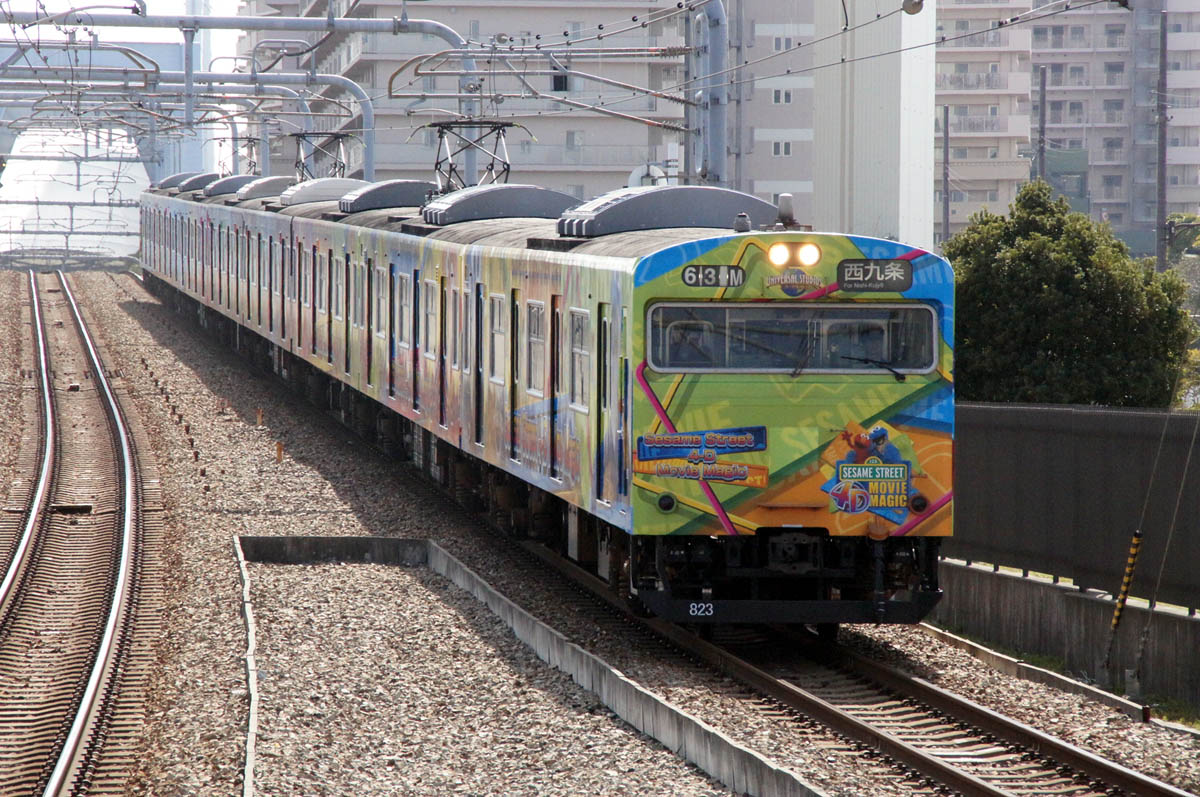
JR-West Sakurajima Line raised driver's cab KuHa 103-823 car, March 2012

=== Converted from 101 series ===
Some 101 series trailer cars were converted to the 103–0 series. The cars' bodies and bogies were 101 series originals as the conversions involved minimum modification. The last of these cars were withdrawn from service in 1999.

- SaHa 103: 751-780 (from SaHa 101)
- KuHa 103: 2001–2004 (from KuHa 100), 2051–2052 (from KuHa 101)

=== Experimental direct-drive mechanism (DDM-VVVF) ===
An insulated gate bipolar transistor traction system and direct-drive motors both manufactured by Toshiba were experimentally tested on car MoHa 103-502 (car #4) on ten-car set KeYo304 based on the Keiyō Line from May 2002; the car was originally manufactured in December 1975 by Nippon Sharyo. The direct-drive motors and IGBT inverters appear to be of the same specification as used on the experimental E993 series set due to similar cadences.

The use of direct-drive motors in the car gave the set a unique sound, with both the roar of the old-fashioned resistor-controlled traction motors and the more modern, high-pitched cadence of the variable frequency drive in car MoHa 103–502; MoHa 103-502's use of direct-drive motors gave the car itself a unique sound, as once the set reached a certain speed, the traction motors made no discernible noise.

The set entered service with the direct-drive motored car on 15 May 2003, but was retired and scrapped in December 2003 after just 7 months of service with this experimental car. Car MoHa 103-502 remains the last 103 series car to have been fitted with a variable frequency drive. No JR train since (other than the E993 and E331 series sets) has used direct-drive motors in combination with IGBT inverters.

== 103-1000 series ==
103-1000 series
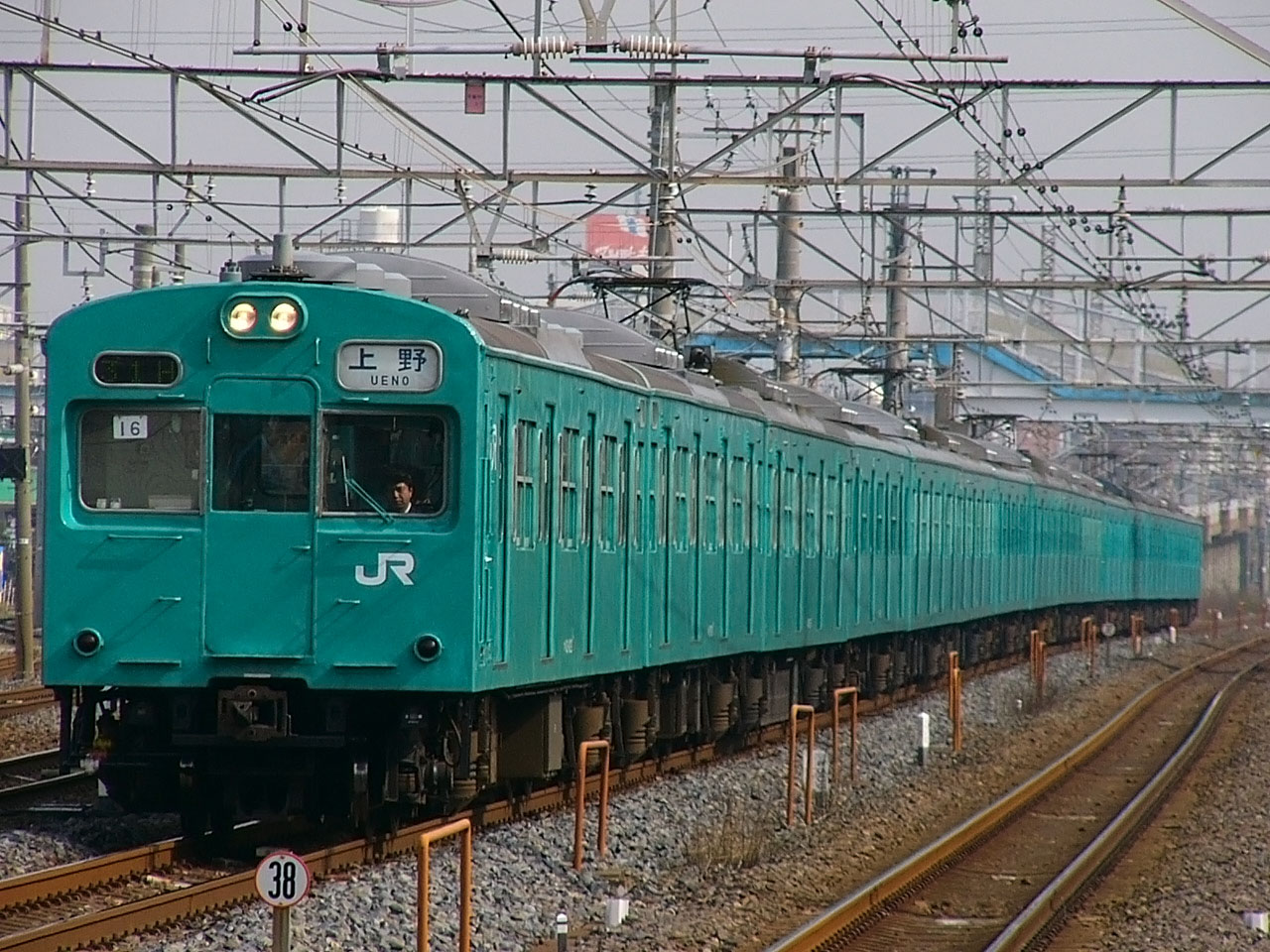
- JR East 103-1000 series in emerald-green Jōban Line livery, April 2003
- In service: 1970–1986 (Joban Line and Tokyo Metro Chiyoda Line local services); 1986–2004 (Joban Line Rapid Service)
- Constructed: 1970–1971
- Entered service: 1970
- Scrapped: 2004
- Number built: 160 vehicles (16 sets)
- Number in service: None
- Number scrapped: 98 vehicles (103-1000 series, the rest of 62 vehicles were converted to 105 series)
- Formation: 51–66 (JNR)
- Operators: JNR (1970-1987); JR East (1987-2004)
- Lines served: Joban Line, Tokyo Metro Chiyoda Line, Tokyo Metro Tozai Line, Chuo-Sobu Line

160 103–1000 series cars (formed 16 10-car sets) were built in 1970 and 1971 for use on Jōban Line-Chiyoda Line inter-running services, which commenced in 1971. Originally painted in grey with a sea green stripe, they were subsequently displaced by new 203 series trains. Some sets were later converted to become 105 series sets, and the rest of the fleet was reallocated to Jōban Line services from Ueno. In 1989, one Joban Line set was reallocated to the Chūō-Sōbu Line-Tōzai Line inter-running services. This set was repainted in grey with light-blue stripe, which was the same livery as the 103–1200 series. The last set was retired in March 2004.

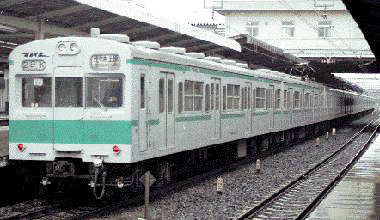
Original JNR livery, 1985

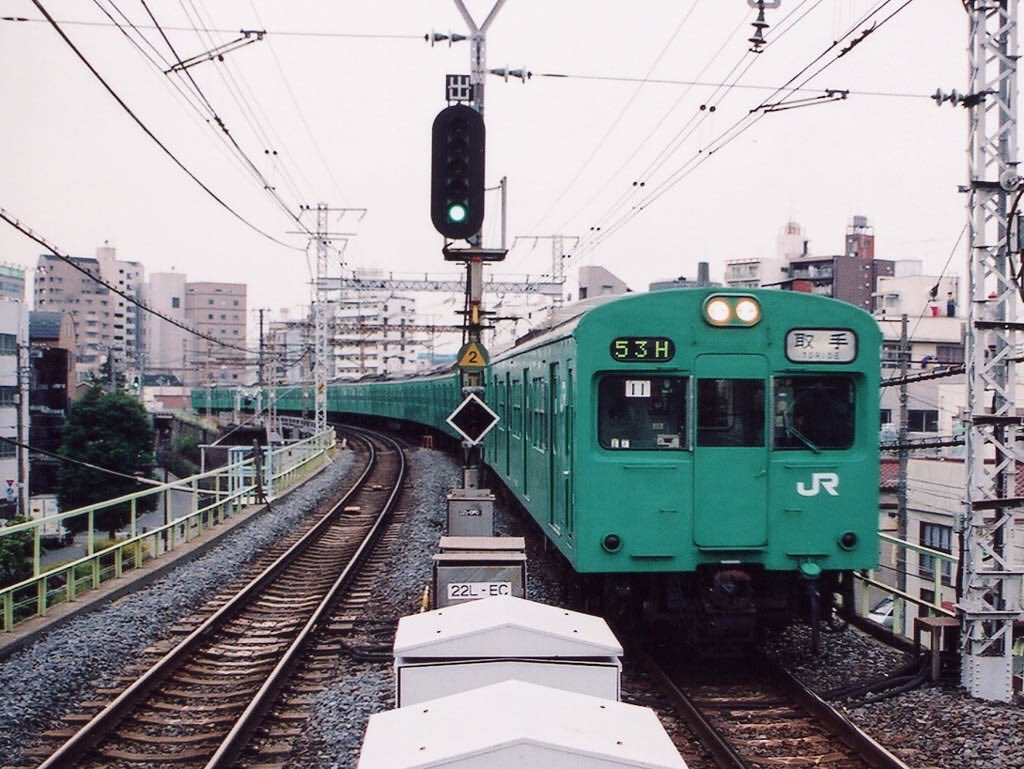
Joban Line Rapid Service 103–1000 series Set MaTo 11, June 1989

== 103-1200 series ==
103-1200 series
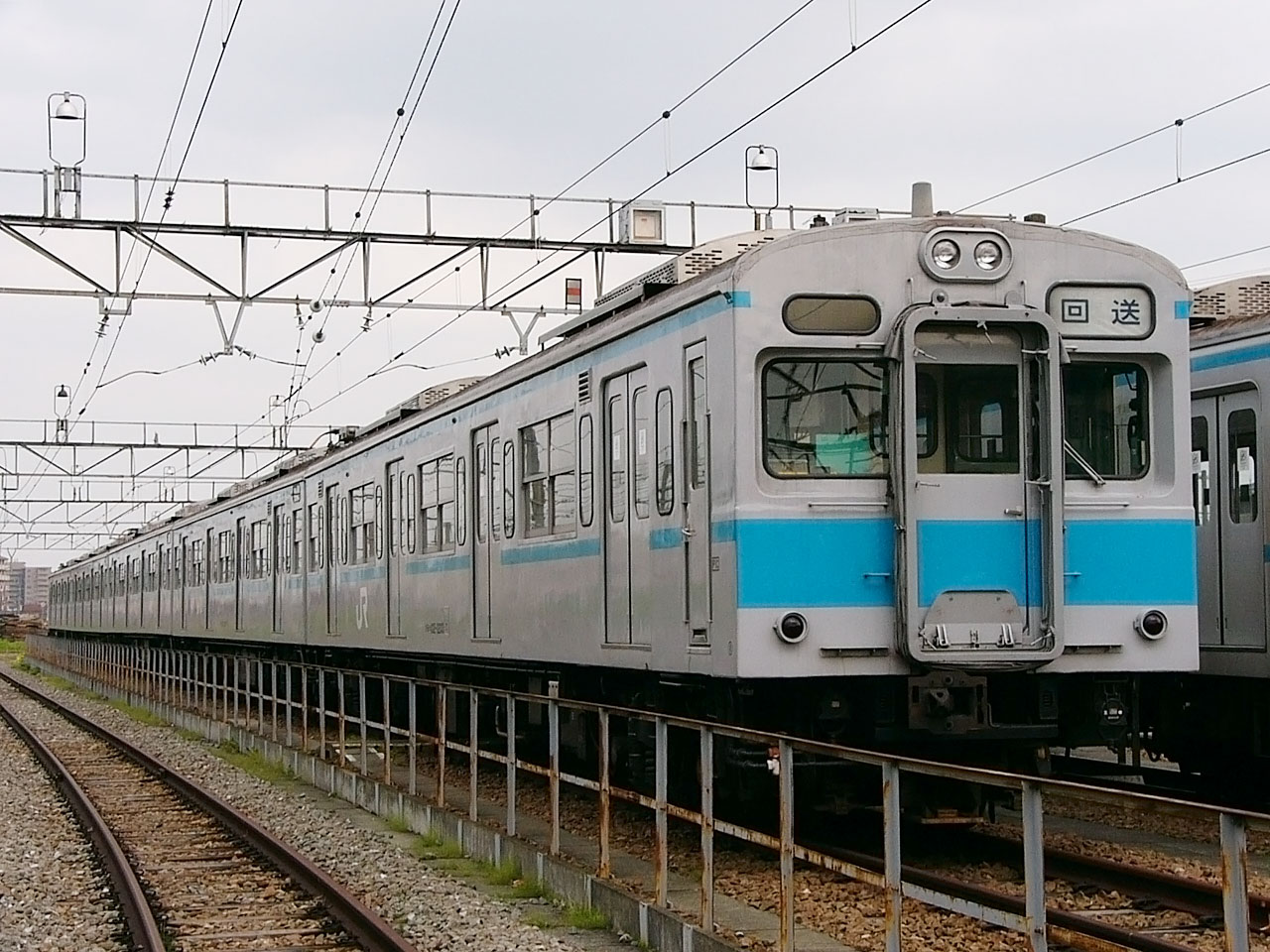
- Revised livery with light blue stripe, May 2003
- In service: 1971–2003
- Constructed: 1971–1978
- Entered service: 1971
- Scrapped: 2003-2004
- Number built: 35 vehicles (5 sets, initially 7-car trainsets)
- Number in service: None
- Number scrapped: 35 vehicles
- Formation: 7/10 car per trainset
- Operators: JNR (1971-1987); JR East (1987-2003)
- Lines served: Tokyo Metro Tozai Line, Chuo-Sobu Line

Specifications
- Multiple working: 301 series

Similar to the 103–1000 series, these were 7-car sets built by Nippon Sharyo and Tokyu Car Corporation for use on Chūō-Sōbu Line-Tōzai Line inter-running services alongside the aluminium-bodied 301 series. Five sets (35 cars) were built between 1970 and 1978. They were initially painted in grey with a yellow stripe, but this was changed to a light blue stripe from 1989 to avoid confusion with the similarly coloured 205 series trains introduced on Chūō-Sōbu Line services. The last set was retired in July 2003.

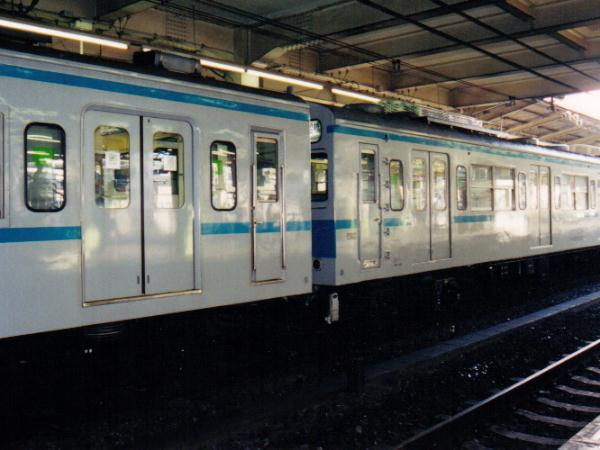
A JR East 301 series (left) and 103–1200 series (right) EMU formation at Funabashi Station, August 2002

== 103-1500 series ==
103-1500 series
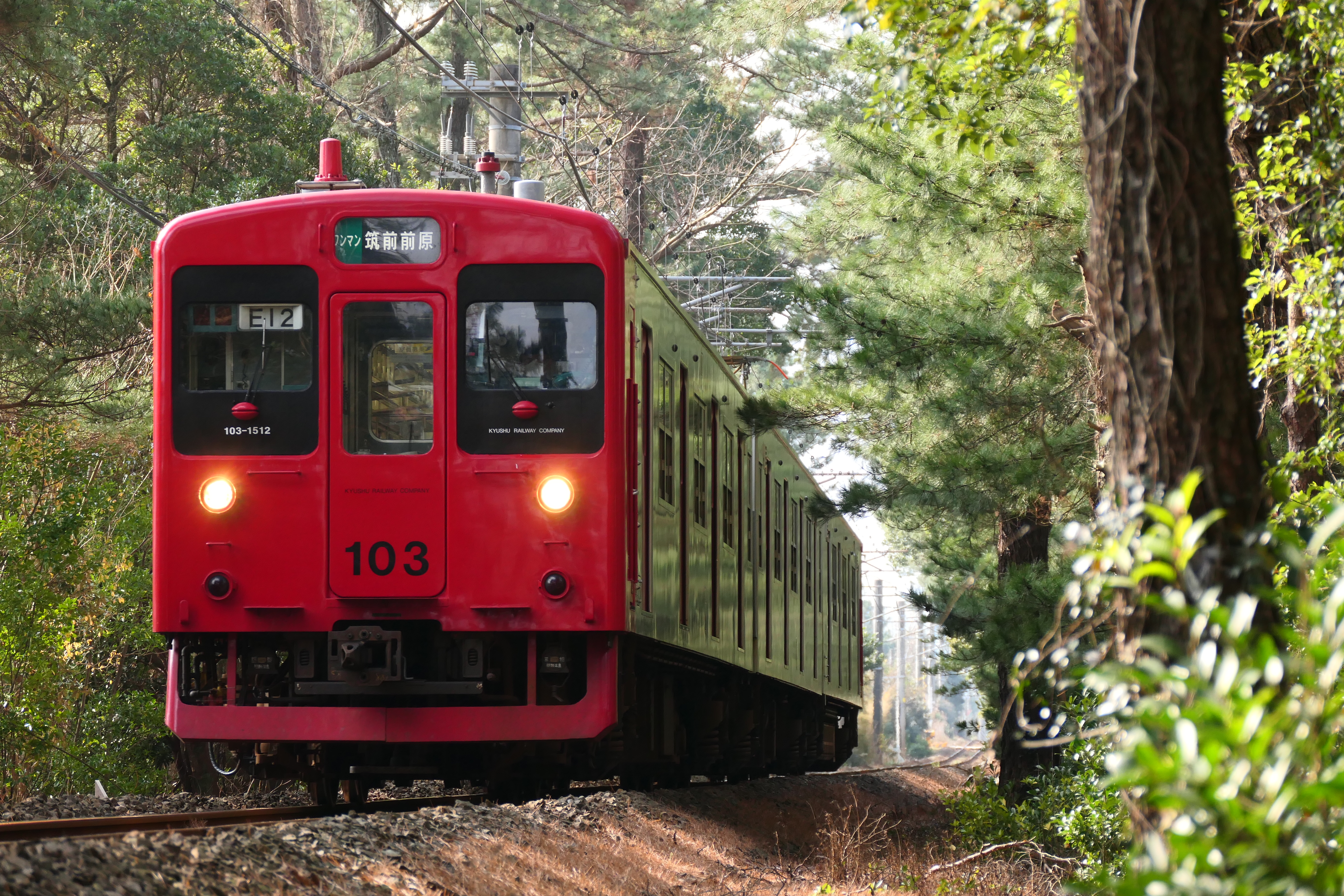
- Chikuhi Line 103-1500 series train running along the Nijino Matsubara pine trees, December 2019
- In service: 1982–present
- Replaced: KiHa 35, KiHa 58
- Constructed: 1982–1984
- Entered service: 1982
- Scrapped: 2015–
- Number built: 54 vehicles (9 sets, initially 6-car trainsets, and later become 3-car trainsets)
- Number in service: 15 vehicles (5 sets)
- Number scrapped: 39 vehicles (13 sets)
- Formation: 3/6 cars per trainset
- Operators: JNR (1982-1987); JR Kyushu (1987-Present)
- Depot: Karatsu
- Lines served: Chikuhi Line, Airport Line

Specifications
- Car body construction: Steel
- Car length: 20,000 mm (65 ft 7 in)
- Width: 2,800 mm (9 ft 2 in)
- Height: 3,935 mm (12 ft 10.9 in)
- Doors: 4 pairs per side
- Maximum speed: 100 km/h (62 mph)
- Weight: 34.1 t (KuHa 103); 42.2 t (KuMoHa 102)
- Traction system: Resistor control
- Power output: 440 kW per car with motors
- Acceleration: 2.5 km/(h⋅s) (1.6 mph/s)
- Deceleration: 5.0 km/(h⋅s) (3.1 mph/s)
- Electric system: 1,500 V DC
- Current collection: overhead catenary
- Track gauge: 1,067 mm (3 ft 6 in)

Nine 103–1500 series 6-car sets were built between 1982 and 1983 by Kawasaki Heavy Industries and Hitachi for use on inter-running services between the Chikuhi Line and the Fukuoka City Subway Airport Line in Kyushu. In 1989, four sets were reformed as eight 3-car sets (numbered E11 to E18) by rebuilding MoHa 103 and MoHa 102 cars as KuMoHa 103 and KuMoHa 102 cars respectively. They were initially painted in light blue with a white stripe, but were repainted into a grey and red livery from 1995. The 3-car sets were modified for driver-only operation between December 1999 and March 2001. Toilets were added to one end car of each set between June 2003 and October 2004.

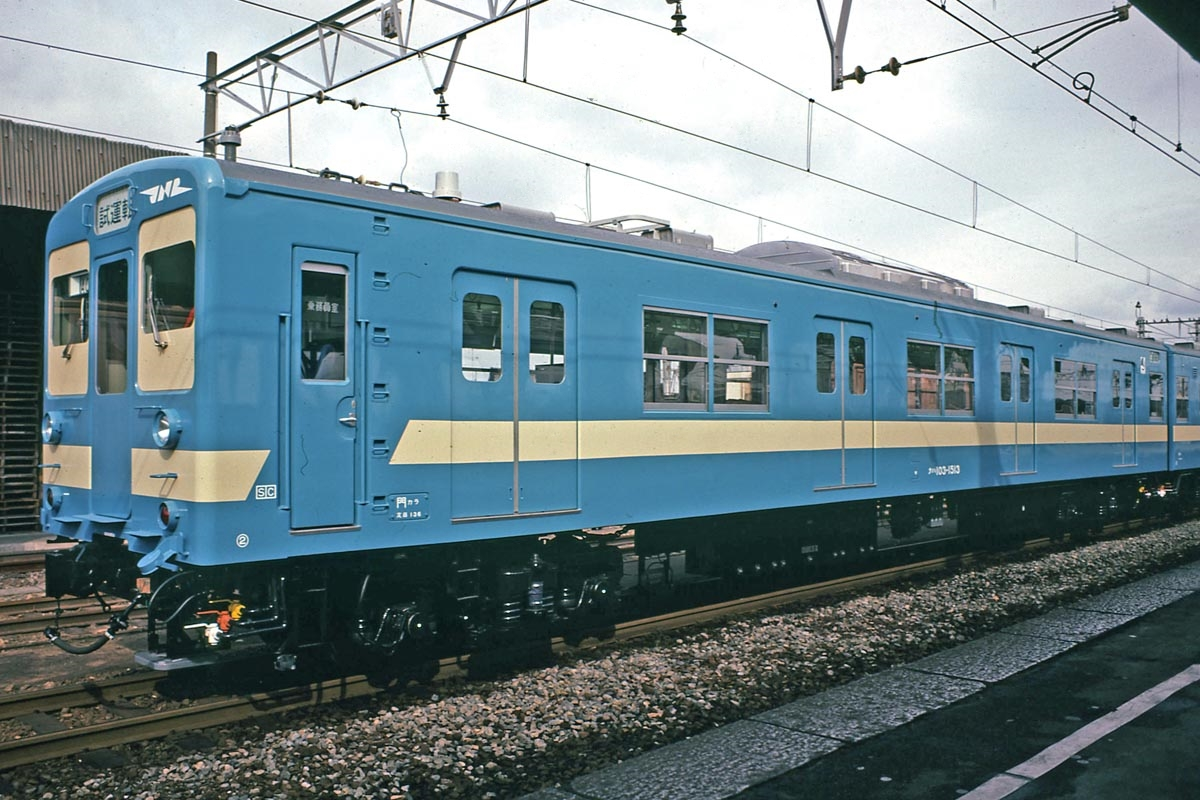
103-1500 series in original livery, February 1983

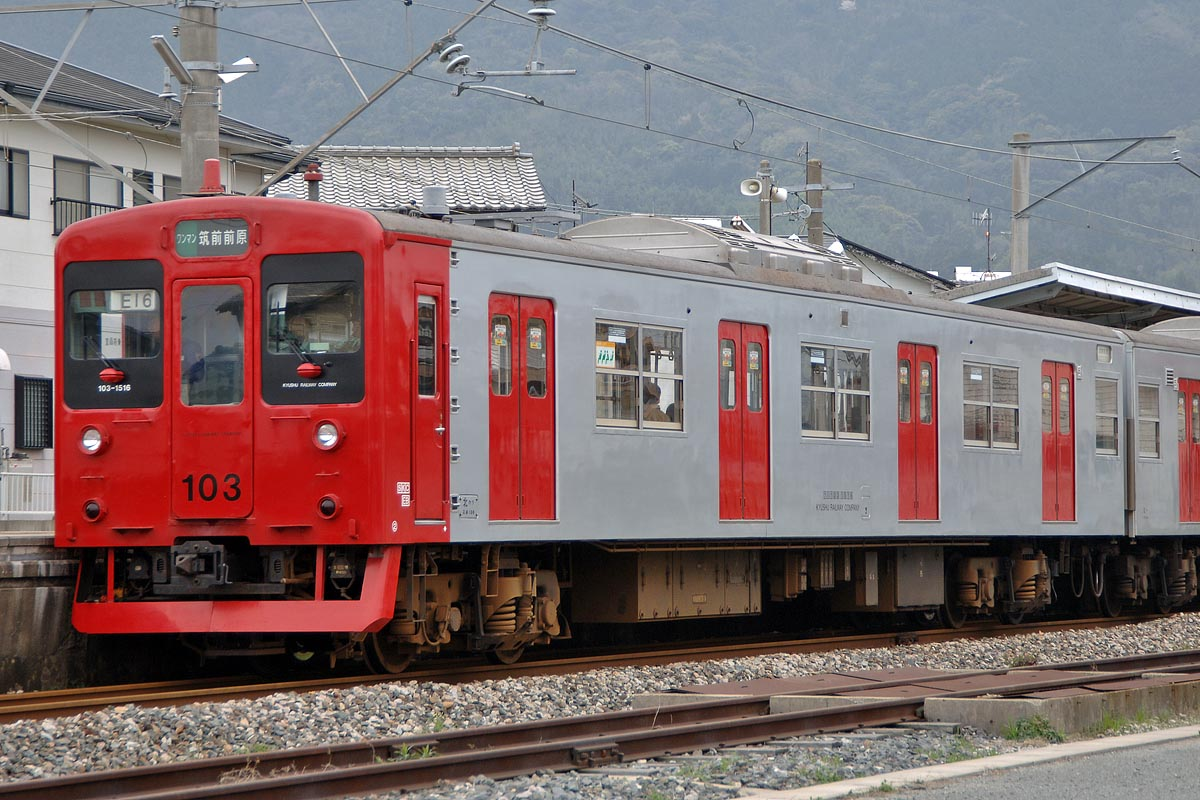
JR Kyushu 103–1500 series in revised livery, April 2006

== 103-3000 series ==
103-3000 series
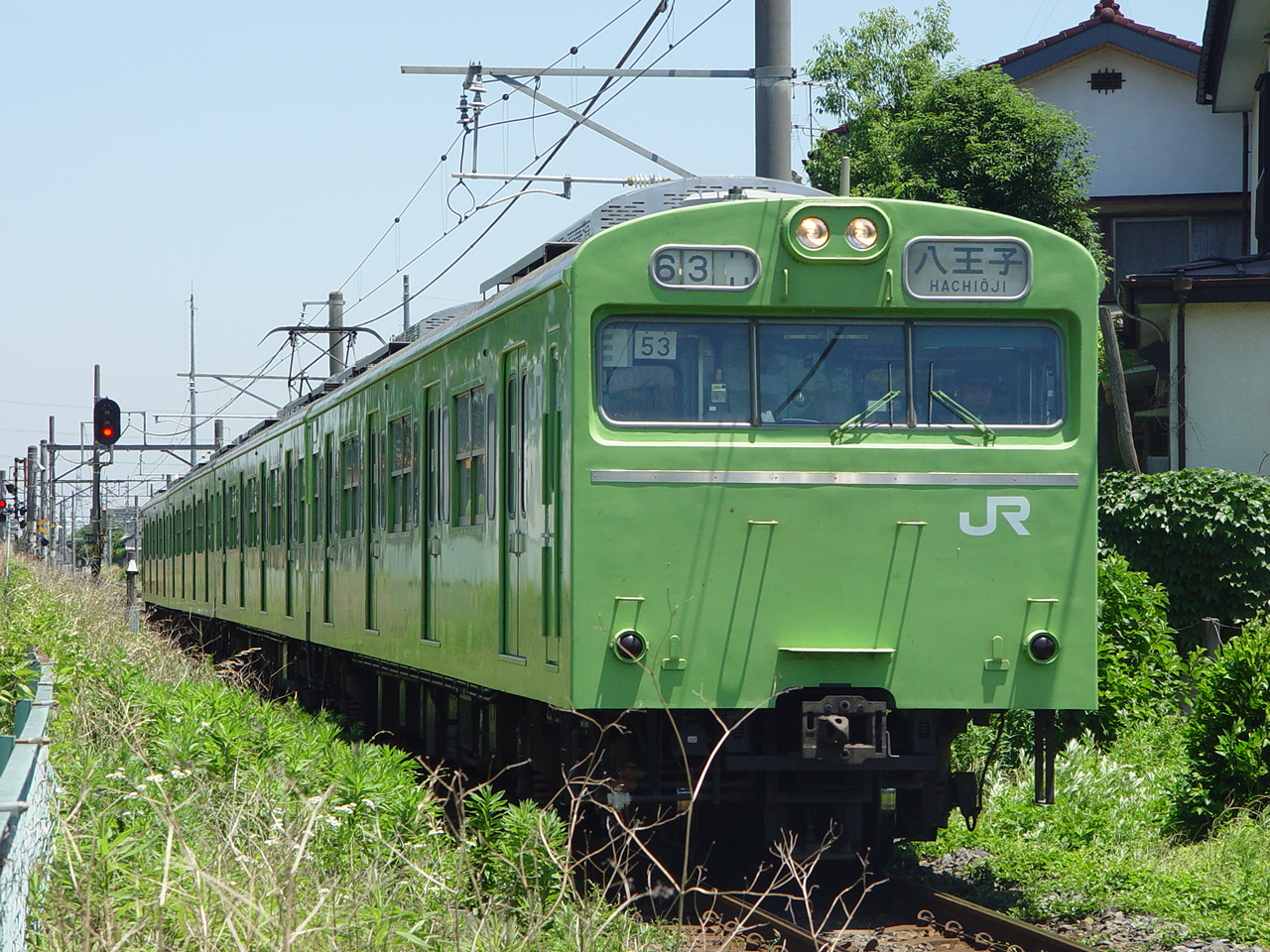
- 4-car Kawagoe Line set 53, June 2004
- In service: 1985–2005
- Replaced: KiHa 35
- Constructed: 1972–1974 (remodeled 72-970 series)
- Entered service: 1985
- Scrapped: 2004-2005
- Number built: 15 vehicles (5 sets, initially 3-cars per set)
- Number in service: None
- Number scrapped: 15 vehicles
- Formation: 3/4 cars per trainset
- Operators: JNR (1985-1987); JR East (1987-2005)
- Lines served: Kawagoe Line, Hachiko Line

Five three-car 103–3000 series sets (numbered 51 to 55) were formed in 1985 from former 72–970 series EMU cars for use on the Kawagoe Line following electrification in September 1985. Five MoHa 72970 cars were also converted to SaHa 103-3000 cars to augment Ome Line trains. These cars were fitted with passenger-operated door controls. The five Kawagoe Line sets were lengthened to four cars between October 1995 and March 1996 ahead of Hachiko Line electrification in March 1996. The last set was withdrawn in October 2005.

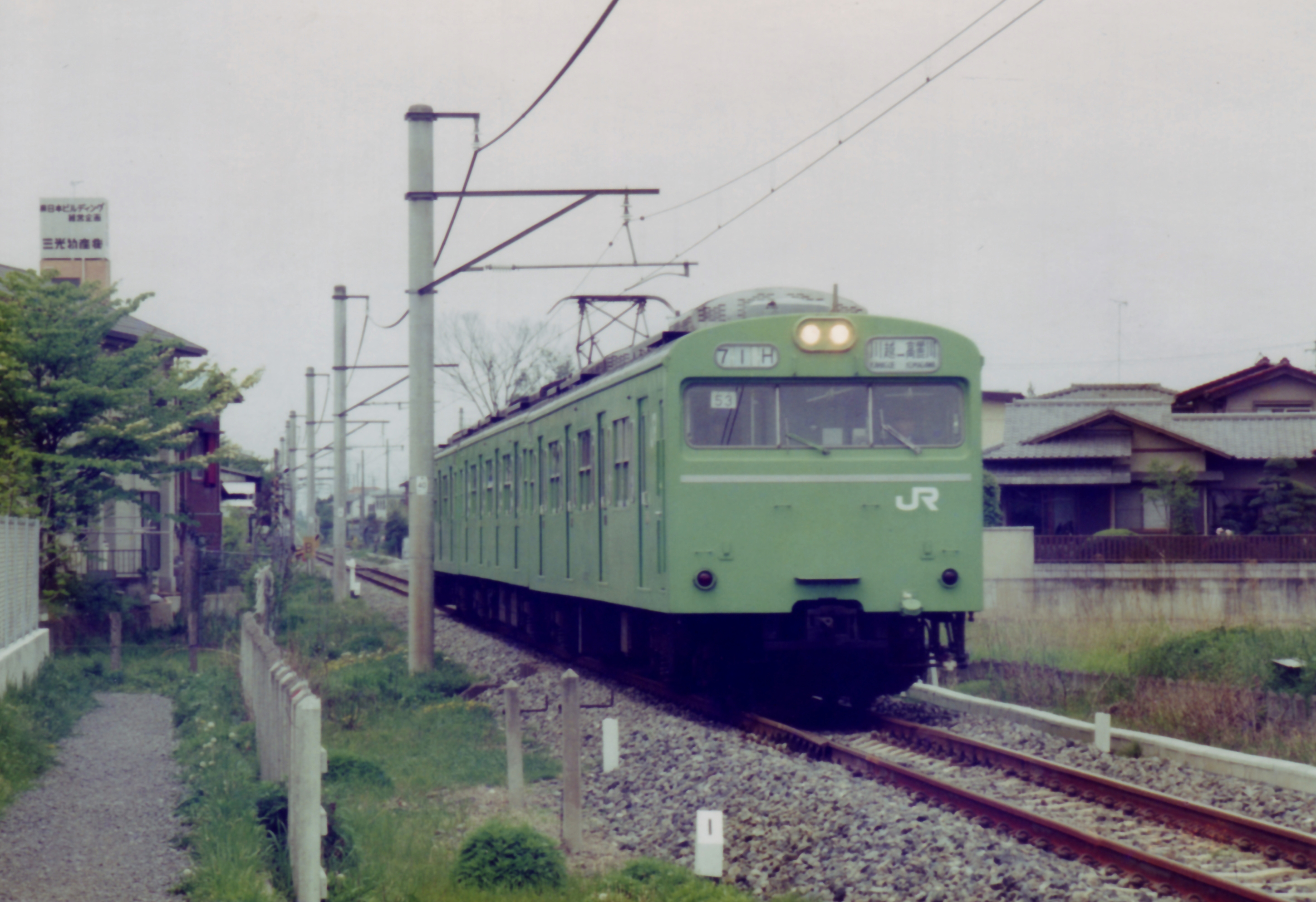
Kawagoe Line 103–3000 series set 53 as a three-car set in May 1993
- Formation
1. KuMoHa 102-3000
2. MoHa 103-3000 (with pantograph)
3. SaHa 103-3000
4. KuHa 103-3000

== 103-3500 series (JR East) ==
103-3500 series (JR East)
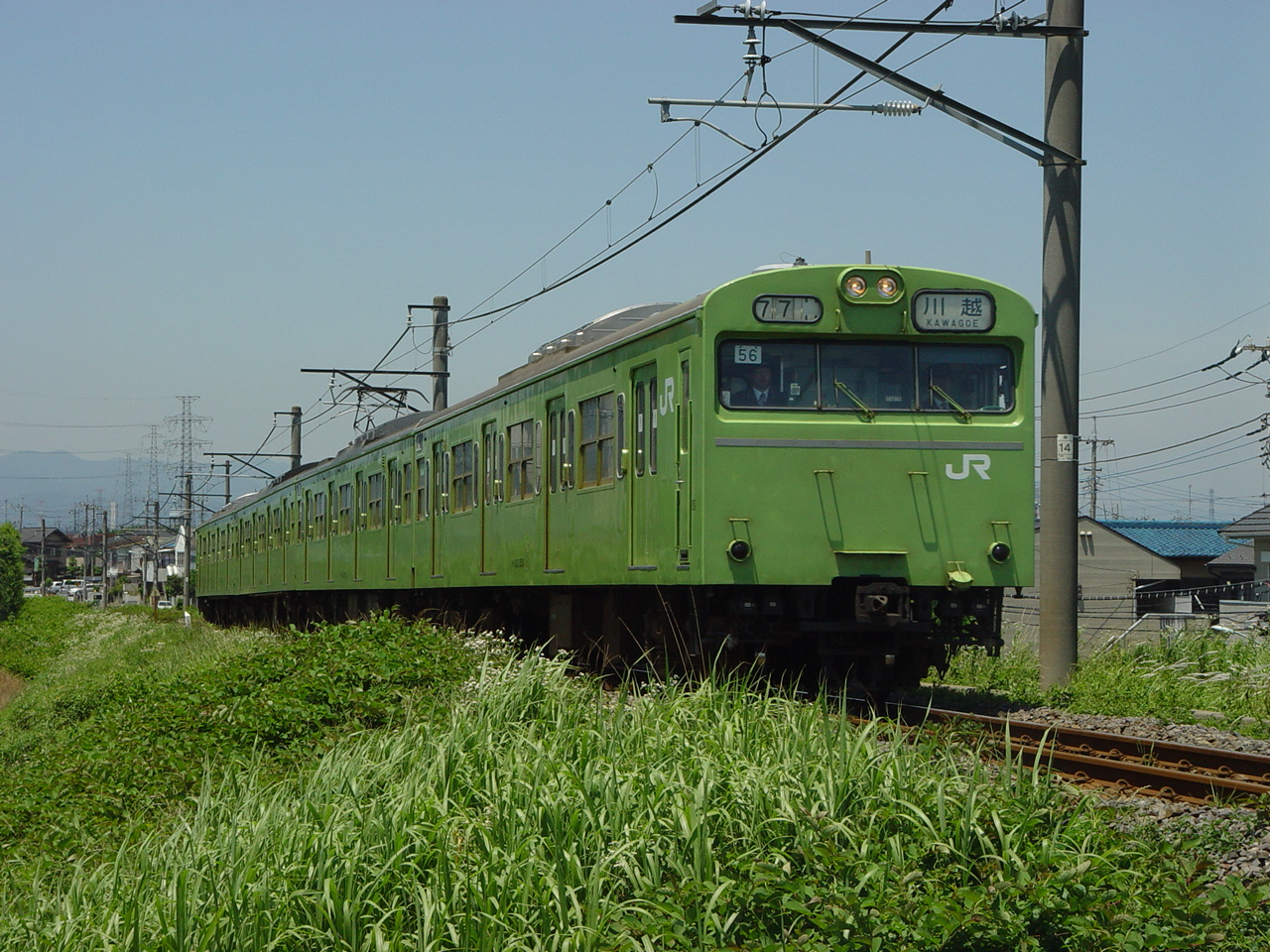
- 4-car Kawagoe Line set 56, June 2004
- In service: 1996–2005
- Replaced: KiHa 35
- Constructed: 1967-1968 (remodeled 103-0 series)
- Entered service: 1996
- Refurbished: 1995
- Scrapped: 2005
- Number built: 4 vehicles (1 set)
- Number in service: None
- Number scrapped: 4 vehicles (1 set)
- Formation: 4 cars per trainset
- Operator: JR East (1996-2005)
- Lines served: Kawagoe Line, Hachiko Line

One 4-car 103–3500 series set was formed in December 1995 from surplus 103–0 series cars to augment the fleet ahead of Hachikō Line electrification in March 1996. As with the 103–3000 series sets, passenger-operated door controls were fitted. The motor/trailer car configuration differed from that of the 103–3000 series sets. The single set was withdrawn in March 2005.

- Formation
1. KuHa 103-3502 (formerly KuHa 103–738)
2. MoHa 102-3501 (formerly MoHa 102–2047)
3. MoHa 103-3501 (with pantograph) (formerly MoHa 103–790)
4. KuHa 103-3501 (formerly KuHa 103–725)

== 103-3500 series (JR West) ==
103-3500 series (JR West)
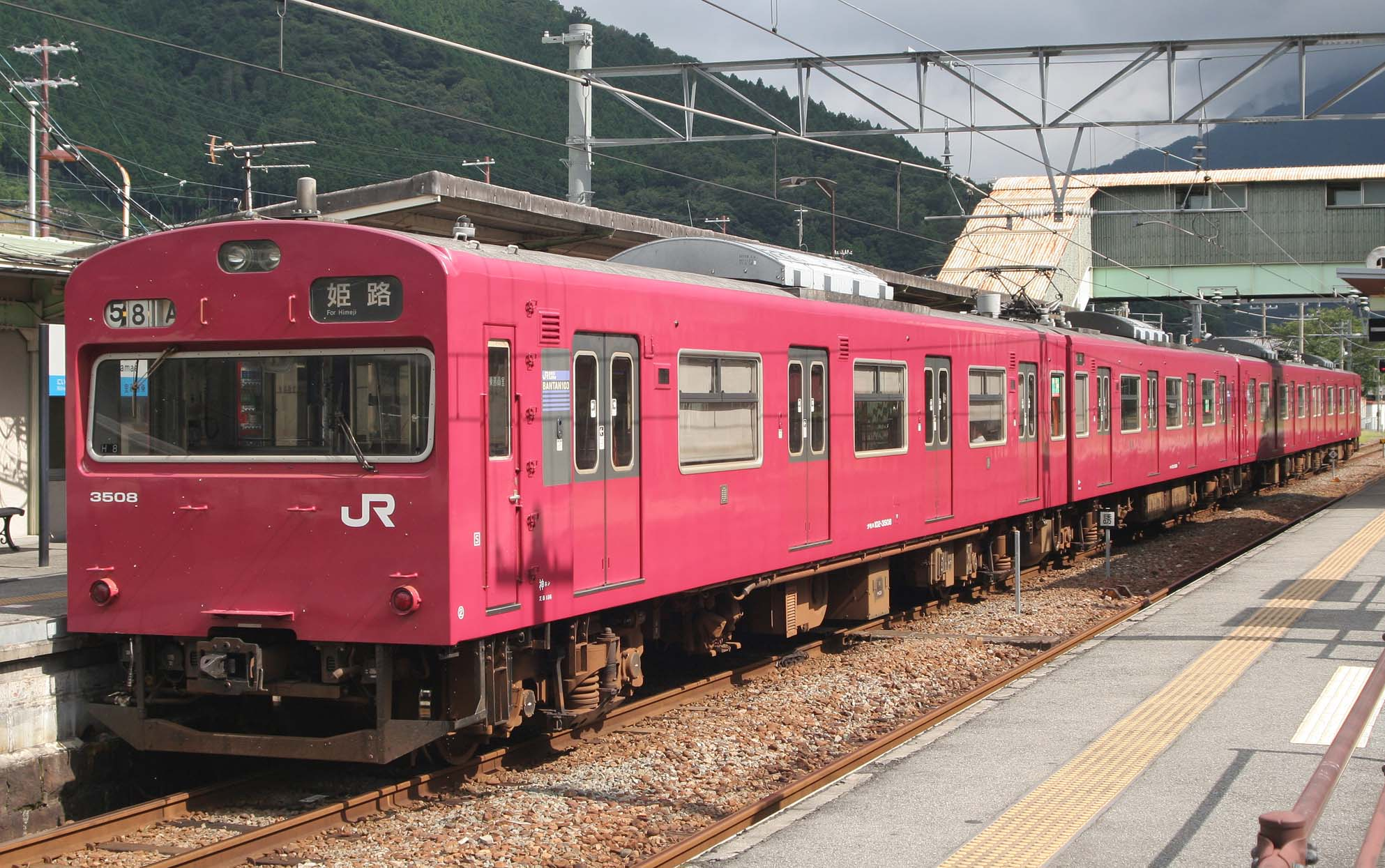
- JR-West refurbished 2-car 103-3500 series sets in Bantan Line livery, August 2007
- In service: 1998–present
- Entered service: 1998
- Refurbished: 1997–1998
- Number built: 18 vehicles (9 sets)
- Number in service: 18 vehicles (9 sets)
- Formation: 2 cars per trainset
- Operator: JR West (1998-present)
- Line served: Bantan Line

Nine 2-car 103–3500 series refurbished sets (H1 to H9) were formed between September 1997 and March 1998 ahead of Bantan Line electrification in March 1998. Toilets were added between 2005 and 2006.

- Formation
1. KuMoHa 102-3500 (with toilet)
2. KuMoHa 103-3500 (with pantograph)

== 103-3550 series ==
103-3550 series
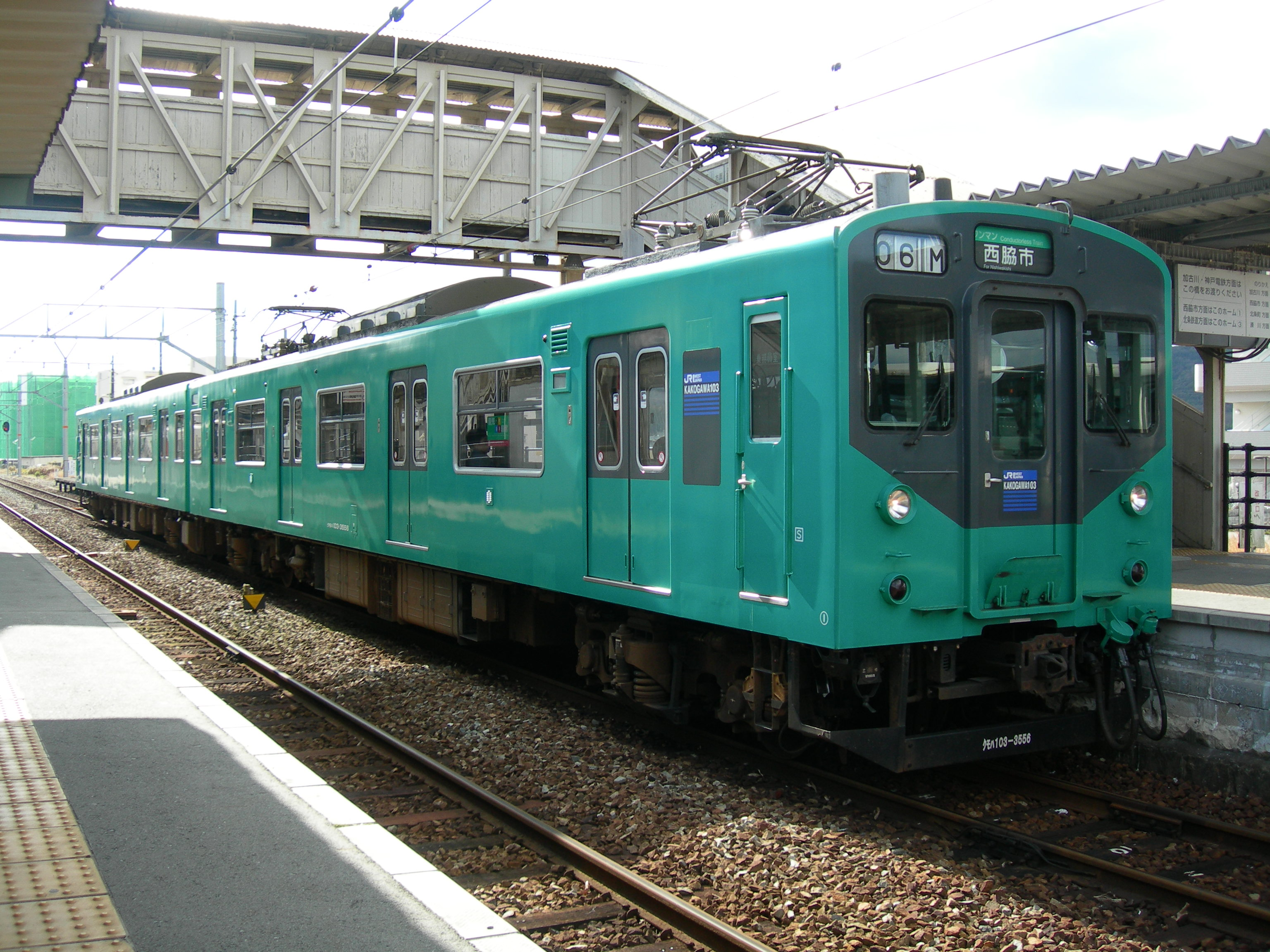
- JR-West refurbished Kakogawa Line 2-car 103-3550 series set, January 2008
- In service: 2005–present
- Replaced: KiHa 37, KiHa 40, KiHa 47
- Entered service: 2005
- Refurbished: 2004
- Number built: 16 vehicles (8 sets)
- Number in service: 16 vehicles (8 sets)
- Formation: 2 cars per trainset
- Operator: JR West (2005-present)
- Line served: Kakogawa Line

Eight 2-car 103–3550 series refurbished sets (M1 to M8) were formed between January and October 2004 ahead of Kakogawa Line electrification in March 2005. These sets feature cab gangway connections and toilets.

- Formation
1. KuMoHa 102-3550 (with toilet)
2. KuMoHa 103-3550 (with pantograph)
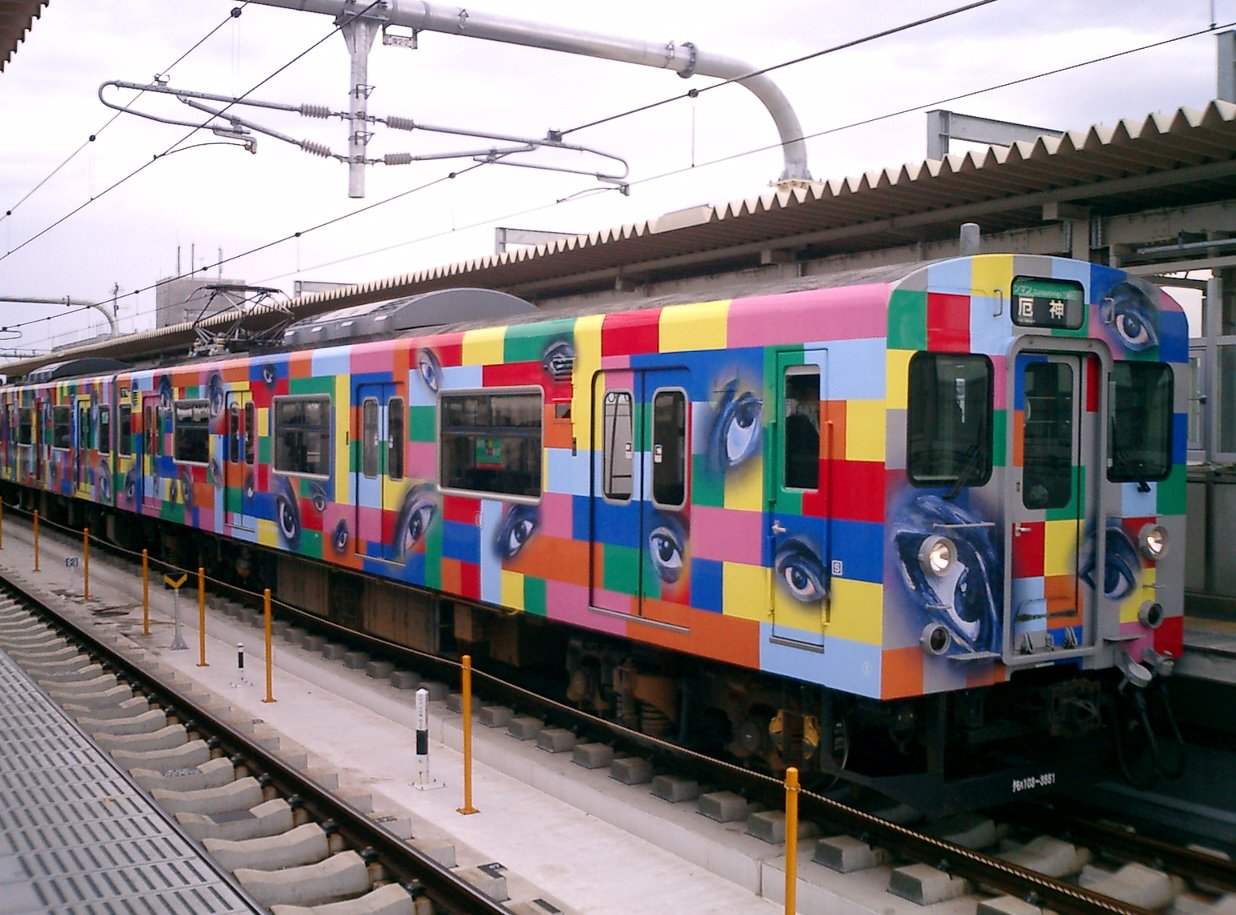
Kakogawa Line 2-car 103–3550 series set M1 with Train with eyes livery by Tadanori Yokoo, October 2005

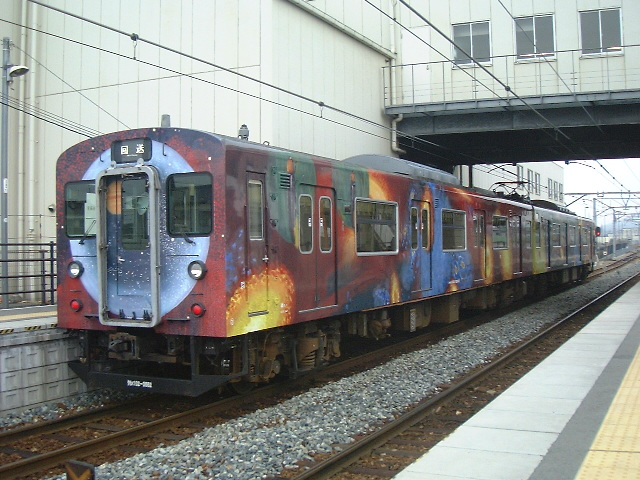
Kakogawa Line 2-car 103–3550 series set M2 with Travel in a galaxy livery by Tadanori Yokoo, February 2006

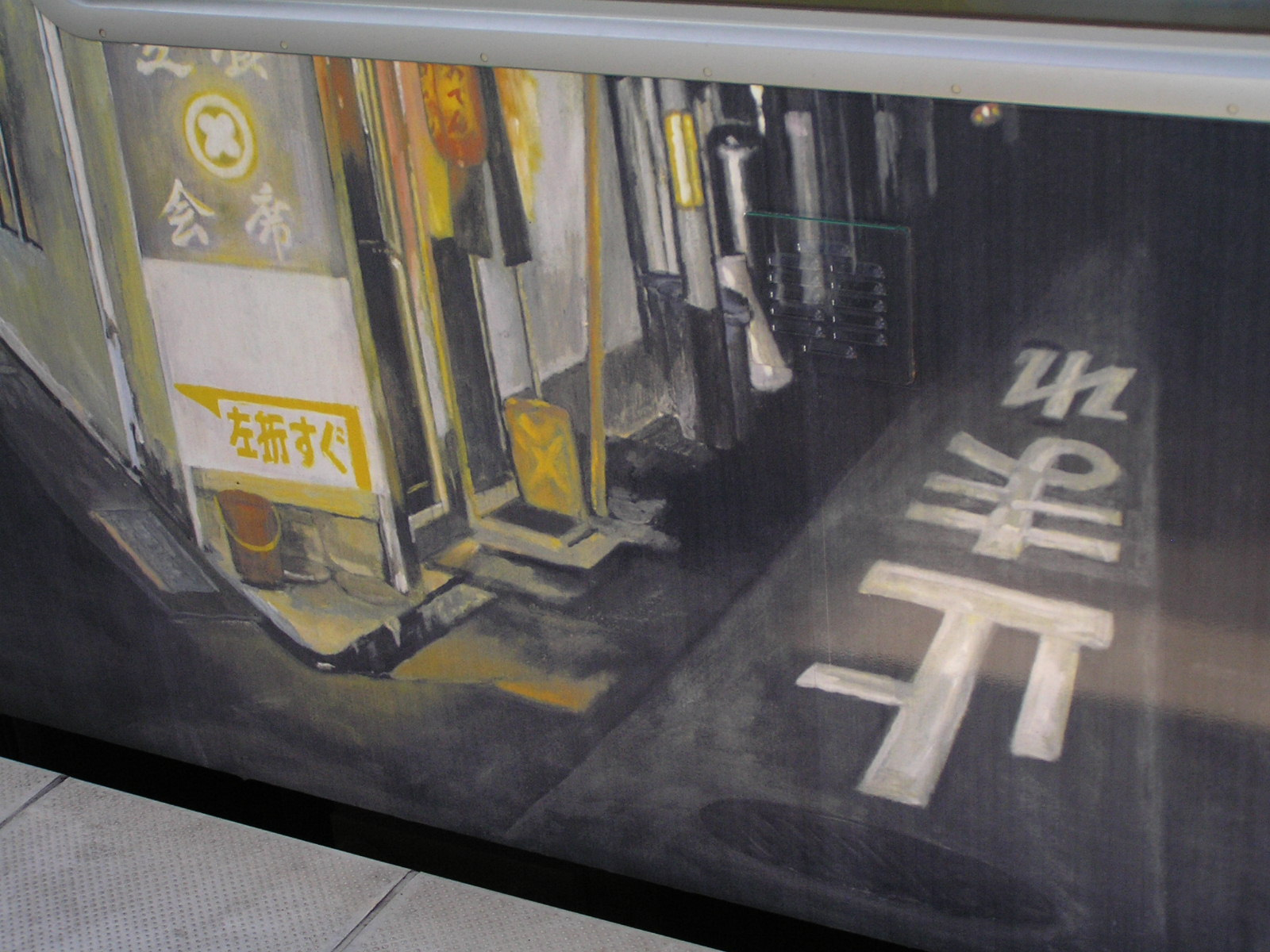
Kakogawa Line 2-car 103–3550 series set M8 with Run! Three-way junction livery side view by Tadanori Yokoo, August 2007

== Internal training sets ==
One internal crew training set, formed as KuMoHa 103-100 + MoHa 102–224, was used for internal crew training at the JR East Crew Training Center at Higashi-Omiya Depot. The set had different cab end designs, as MoHa 102-224 used the cab of former ATC equipped KuHa 103–332, sets. It was withdrawn in 2009 following the delivery of a new 209 series-based training set in 2008.

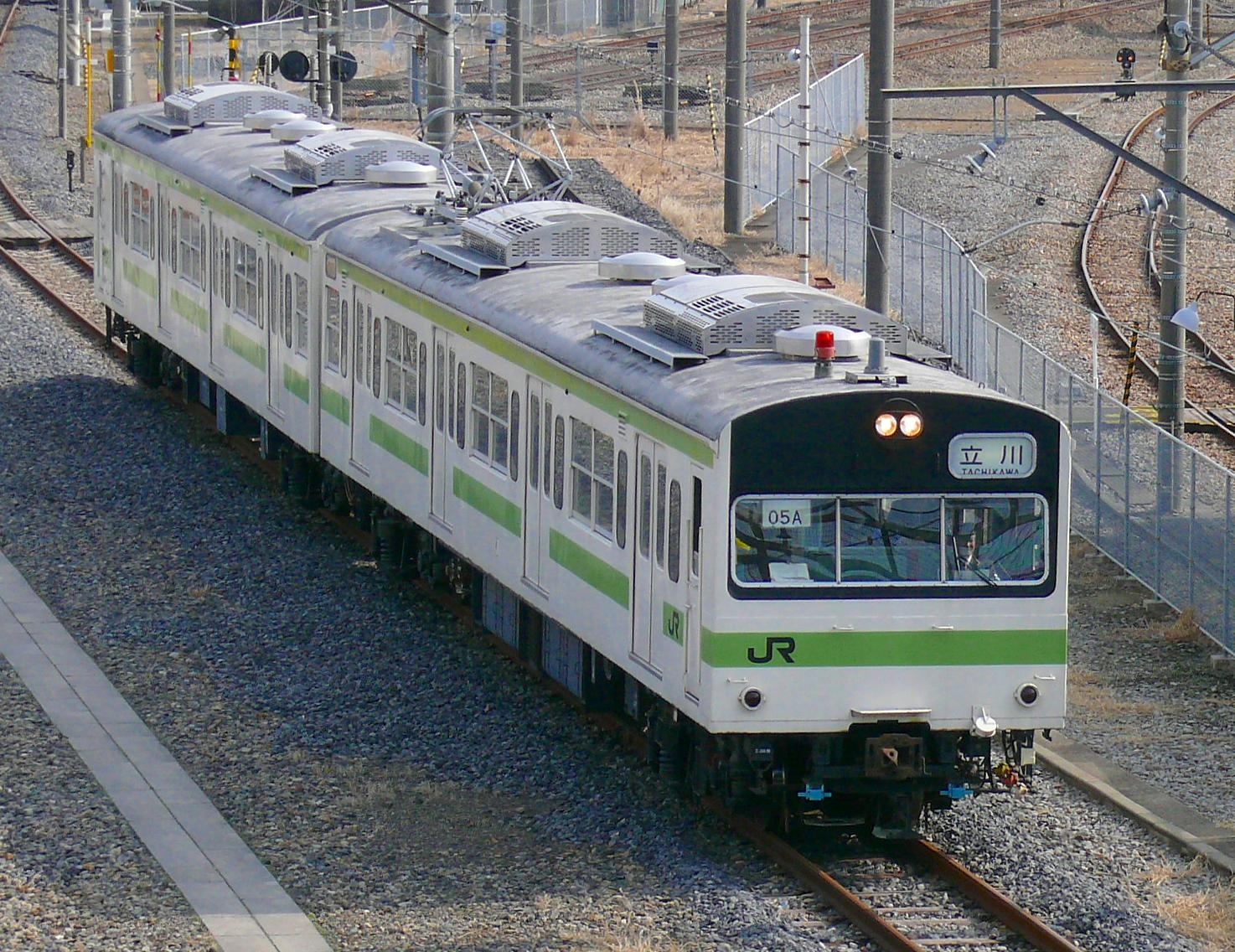
Higashi-Ōmiya set, 2008

== Preserved examples ==
- KuHa 103-1: Preserved at the Kyoto Railway Museum in Kyoto since April 2016.
- KuHa 103-525: Stored at Toshiba factory in Fuchu, Tokyo
- KuHa 103-713: Preserved at the Railway Museum in Saitama, Saitama (front end only).
- KuMoHa 103-18: Stored at Mino-Ōta Depot in Minokamo, Gifu.
- KuMoHa 103-58: Previously Used at the Toshiba factory in Fuchu, Tokyo. Scrapped in 2011.
- KuMoHa 103-110: Used for training purposes at the Osaka Prefectural Firefighting College in Daito, Osaka.
- KuMoHa 103-147: Privately preserved in Ibaraki Prefecture.
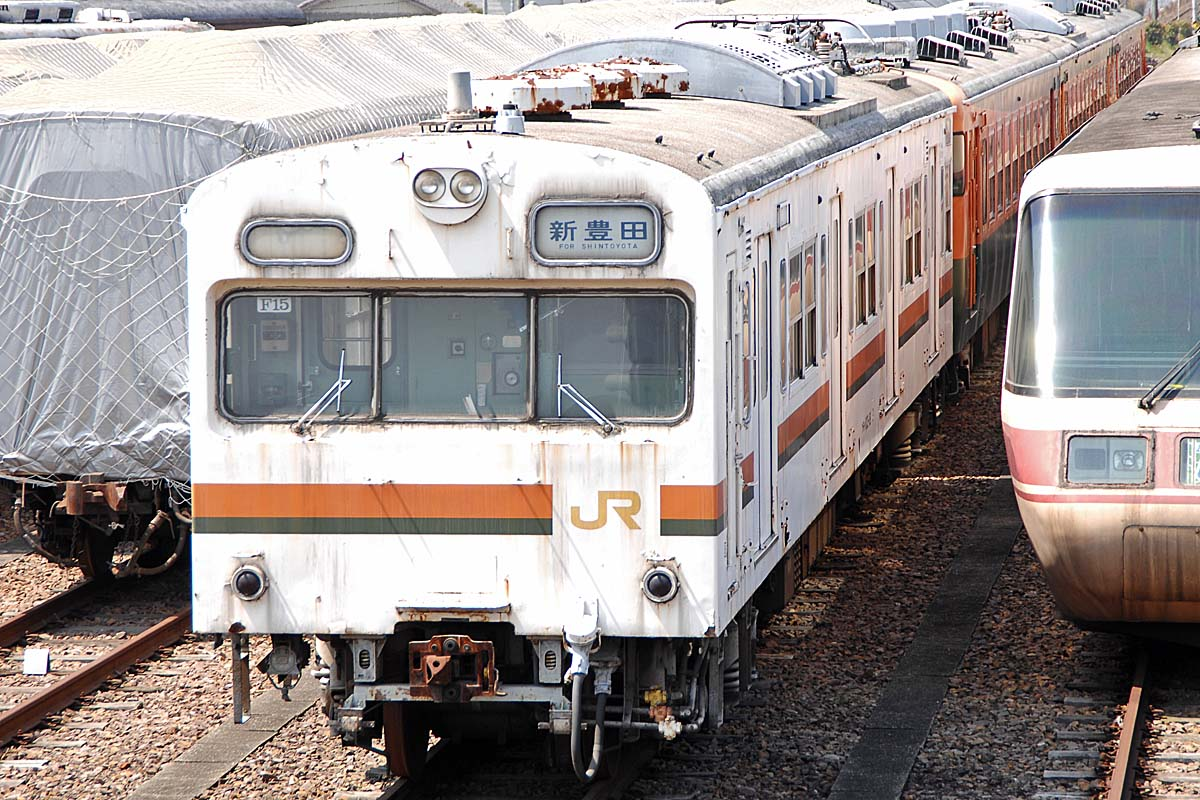
KuMoHa 103–18 at Mino-Ōta Depot in April 2007

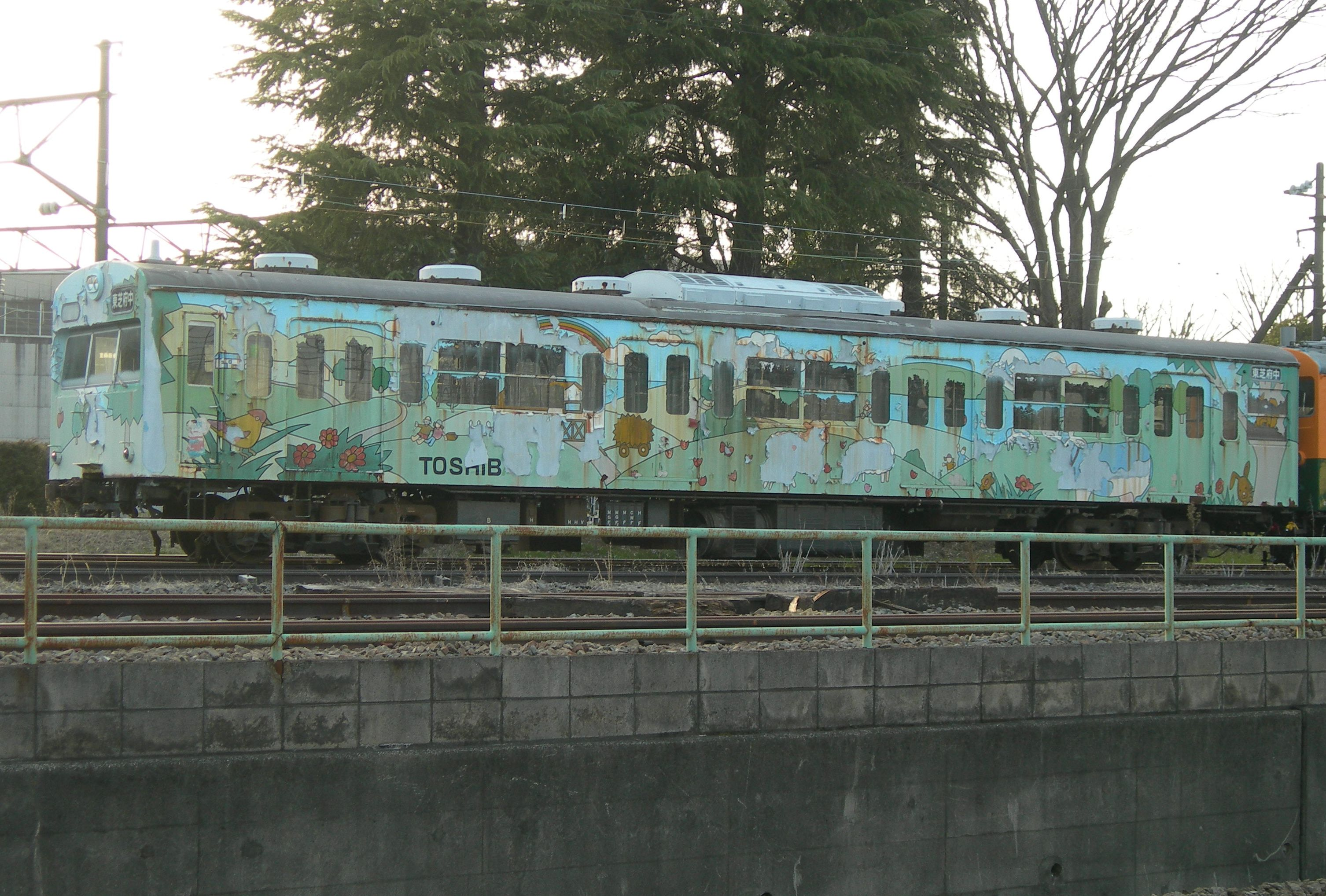
KuHa 103–525 at the Toshiba factory in Fuchu in March 2010

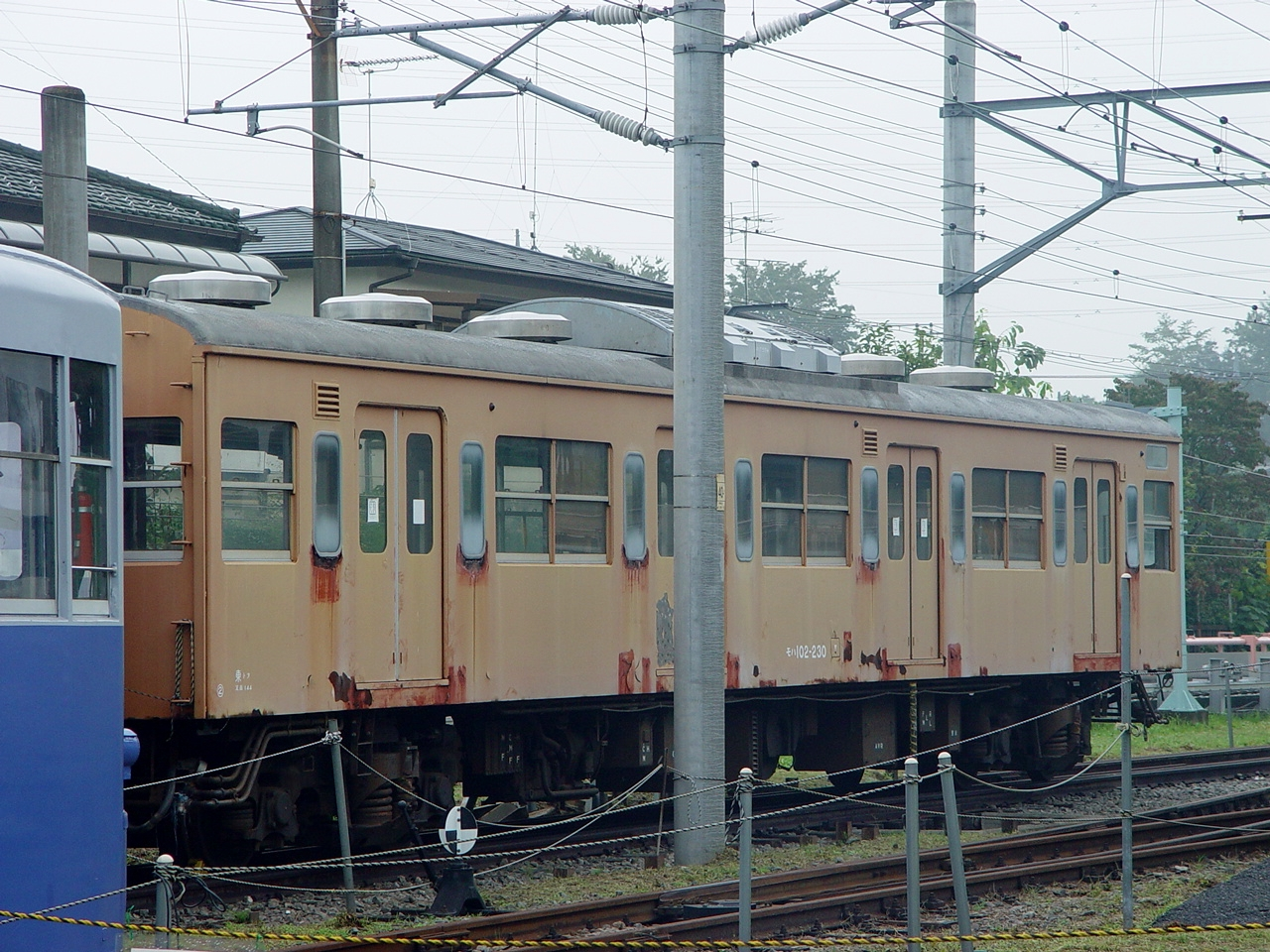
MoHa 102-230 stored at the RTRI facility in Kokubunji, Tokyo, in October 2010
