= Izukyu 3000 series =

Japanese electric multiple unit train type

Izukyu 3000 series Aloha Train
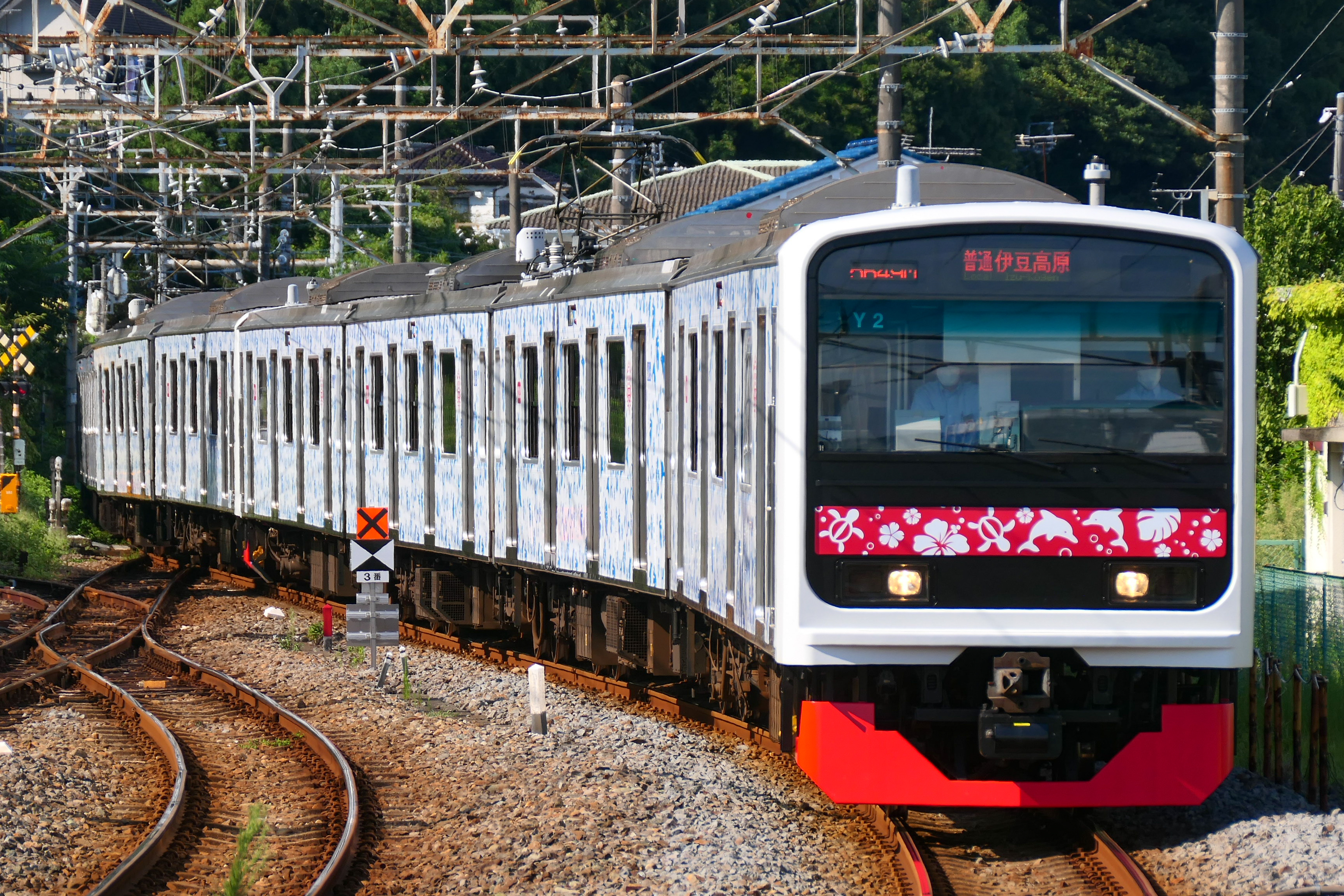
- A 3000 series set, August 2022
- In service: 30 April 2022 – present
- Constructed: 1994–1996
- Number built: 10 vehicles
- Number in service: 8 vehicles (2 sets)
- Formation: 4 cars per set
- Operators: Izukyu Corporation
- Lines served: Izu Kyuko Line; Ito Line

The Izukyu 3000 series (Japanese: 伊豆急行3000系, romanized: Izu Kyūkō 3000-kei), branded "Aloha Train", is an electric multiple unit train type operated by the private railway operator Izukyu Corporation. Entering service on 30 April 2022, the fleet of two 4-car sets was inherited in 2021 from former East Japan Railway Company (JR East) 209 series EMUs, which were previously used on services throughout the Bōsō Peninsula.

== History ==
=== Background ===
JR East introduced the 209 series in 1993, initially on the Keihin–Tōhoku Line and Negishi Line, to replace the 103 series trains that were previously used. 209 series sets were later deployed on other lines, including the Nambu and Kawagoe lines. Designed to be a low-cost, lightweight, minimal-lifespan vehicle, the 209 series design set the standard for subsequent JR East commuter train designs.

From 2009, some Keihin–Tōhoku–Negishi Line-allocated sets were transferred and refurbished to operate throughout the Bōsō Peninsula, following the introduction of newer E233 series trains. Much of the Bōsō-allocated fleet was replaced from 2021 by new E131 series trains, following many of the lines within the region being modified to accommodate one-man operation.

=== Inheritance by Izukyu Corporation ===
In July 2021, Izukyu Corporation announced its plan to procure 209 series trains that were previously operated by JR East on services throughout the Bōsō Peninsula. Ten former 209 series cars were inherited by November of that year. The following month, Izukyu announced that the fleet would be given the classification "3000 series".

The 3000 series incorporates a Hawaii-inspired theme; this is reflected through the brand name "Aloha Train", a Honu-inspired external wrapping pattern, a color scheme borrowed from the "Resort 21" trainsets, and internal door wrappings of various seas in Izu. They are also the first trains operated by Izukyu to use variable-frequency drive (VVVF) technology and also did not require large-scale refurbishment. In contrast, the older 8000 series trains inherited from Tokyu Corporation required the installation of toilets, onboard passenger information displays, electrical coupling, and transverse seating; these features were already included with the 3000 series sets upon their inheritance by Izukyu Corporation.

The 3000 series fleet was introduced into service on 30 April 2022. Originally, the fleet was only used on the Izu Kyuko Line, but on 13 June 2022, they began use on the JR Ito Line as well.
