= 209 series =

Japanese train type

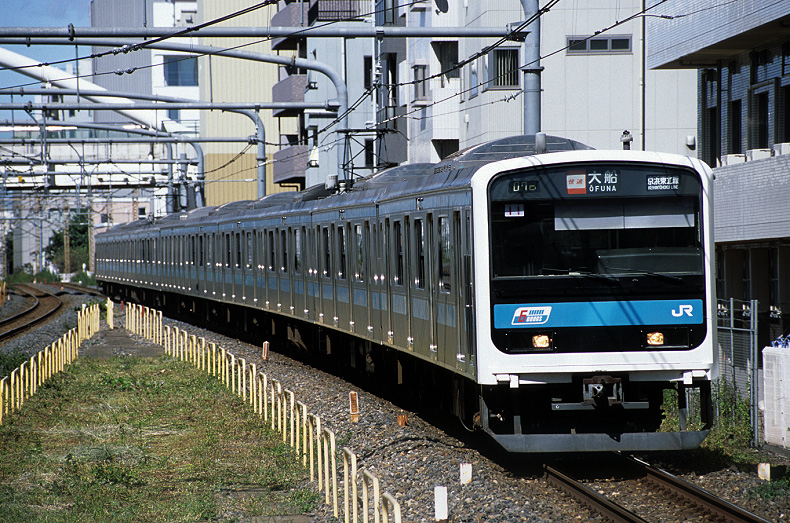
- A 209-0 series set on the Keihin–Tōhoku Line approaching Saitama-Shintoshin Station, October 2006
- In service: 1992–present
- Manufacturers: JR East, Kawasaki Heavy Industries, Tokyu Car Corporation
- Replaced: KiHa 35, 103 series, 113 series, 211 series
- Constructed: 1992–2005
- Entered service: 7 May 1992 (901/209-900 series); 15 February 1993 (209-0 series)
- Number built: 1,046 vehicles
- Number in service: 442 vehicles (as of December 2021)
- Number preserved: 1 vehicle
- Successor: E131 series, E231 series, E233 series
- Formation: 4/6/8/10 cars per trainset
- Operator: JR East
- Depots: Kawagoe, Keiyō, Makuhari, Nakahara, Toyoda
- Lines served: Chūō Line (Rapid), Hachikō Line, Kashima Line, Kawagoe Line, Keiyō Line, Musashino Line, Narita Line, Ōme Line, Sotobō Line, Sōbu Main Line, Tōgane Line, Uchibō Line

Specifications
- Car body construction: Stainless steel
- Car length: 20,000 mm (65 ft 7 in)
- Width: 2,966 mm (9 ft 8.8 in) (209-500 series); 2.87 m (9 ft 5 in) (other)
- Doors: 4/6 pairs per side
- Maximum speed: 110 km/h (68.4 mph)
- Traction system: Variable frequency (GTO, IGBT)
- Power output: 1,520 kW (6 motors)
- Acceleration: 2.5 km/(h⋅s) (1.6 mph/s); 3.3 km/(h⋅s) (2.1 mph/s) (209-1000 series)
- Deceleration: 4.0 km/(h⋅s) (2.5 mph/s)(service); 4.5 km/(h⋅s) (2.8 mph/s) (emergency)
- Electric system: 1,500 V DC overhead
- Current collection: PS28 diamond-shaped pantograph PS21 diamond-shaped pantograph (209-1000 series); PS33A single-arm pantograph (209-500 series)
- Braking systems: Regenerative brake, electronically controlled pneumatic brakes
- Safety systems: ATS-P, ATS-SN, ATC, Digital ATC
- Track gauge: 1,067 mm (3 ft 6 in)

The 209 series (209系) is an electric multiple unit (EMU) commuter train type operated by East Japan Railway Company (JR East) in the Tokyo area of Japan since 1993.

The series was introduced in 1992 for experimental operations (as the 901 series) and in 1993 for commercial operations to replace the aging 103 series stock on the Keihin–Tōhoku and Negishi lines. The concept of the 209 series was to create a lower-cost, limited lifespan train (approximately 15 years) that would be replaced rather than rebuilt when they reached the end of their operational lives.

The 209 series was the first of the "new series trains" (新系列電車, Shin-keiretsu densha), and served as the basis for the E501, E217, 701, and E127 series rolling stock, as well as the succeeding E231 series stock, which in turn became the blueprint for successive trains developed by JR East and other railway companies in Japan.

== Variants ==
JR East

- / 209-500 series: 10-car set used on the Keiyō Line since 2008, and 8-car sets on the Musashino Line since 2010
- 209-2000/2100 series: 6/4-car sets converted from former Keihin–Tōhoku—Negishi Line 209-0 series units, used on Narita Line, Sōbu Main Line, Sotobō Line, Tōgane Line, and Uchibō Line services since 2009
- 209-2200 series: 6-car set used from January 2018 as the Boso Bicycle Base
- 209-3500 series: 4-car sets converted from former Chūō–Sōbu Line 209-500 series units, used on the Kawagoe Line and Hachikō Line since 2018

Izukyū Corporation

- Izukyu 3000 series: 4-car set used on the Izu Kyūkō Line since 2022

=== Former operations ===
- / 209-0 series: 10-car sets used on the Keihin–Tōhoku—Negishi Line from 1993 until January 2010, and 6-car sets on the Nambu Line until February 2015
- / 209-500 series: 10-car sets used on the Chūō–Sōbu Line from 1998 until April 2019 and the Keihin–Tōhoku—Negishi Line from 2001 to 2009
- 209-900/910/920 series: 10-car prototypes initially classified as 901 series used on the Keihin–Tōhoku—Negishi Line
- 209-950 series: 10-car set used on the Chūō–Sōbu Line until it was redesignated as the E231-900 series
- / Two 209-1000 series 10-car sets used on the Jōban Line from 1999 until October 2018, then later on the Chūō Line (Rapid) (and occasionally the Ōme Line) from March 2019 until September 2024
- 209-2000/2100 series: 4-car sets used on the Kashima Line from 2009 until March 2021
- 209-2200 series: 6-car sets used on the Nambu Line from 2009 until March 2017
- 209-3000 series: 4-car sets used on the Kawagoe Line and Hachikō Line from March 1996 until February 2019
- 209-3100 series: 4-car sets converted from surplus TWR 70-000 series units, used on the Kawagoe Line and Hachikō Line from April 2005 until January 2022

== 209-0 series ==
209-0 series
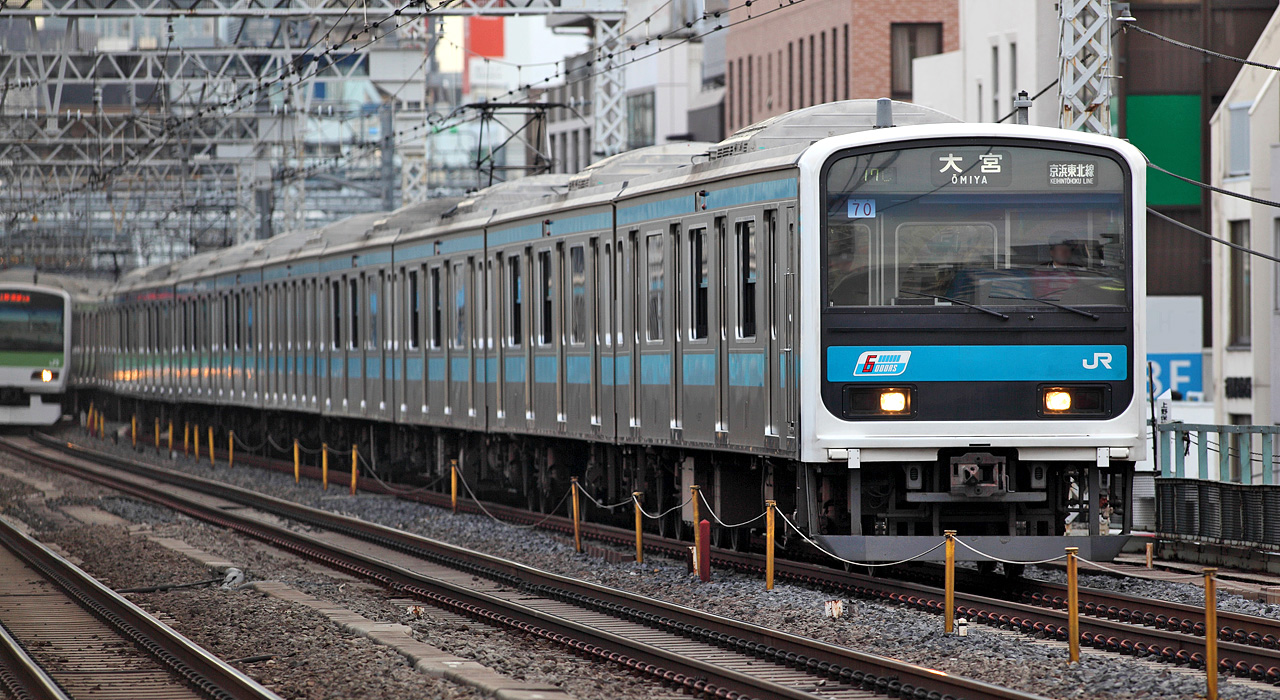
- A Keihin–Tōhoku 10-car 209-0 series set in March 2009
- In service: 1993–2015
- Replaced: 103 series, 205 series
- Constructed: 1992–1997
- Entered service: 1993
- Scrapped: 2008–2016
- Number built: 792 vehicles
- Number in service: None (324 vehicles converted to 209-2000/2100 series; 18 vehicles converted to 209-2200 series; 7 vehicles converted to MUE-Train; 6 vehicles converted for training units)
- Number scrapped: 437 vehicles
- Formation: 10 cars per trainset (Keihin-Tōhoku & Negishi Lines); 6 cars per trainset (Nambu Line)
- Operator: JR East
- Depots: Urawa, Nakahara
- Lines served: Keihin–Tōhoku Line, Nambu Line, Negishi Line

Specifications
- Car body construction: Stainless steel
- Width: 2,870 mm (9 ft 5 in)
- Doors: 4/6 pairs per side
- Traction system: Mitsubishi GTO-VVVF
- Traction motors: MT68
- Electric system: 1,500 V DC overhead catenary
- Track gauge: 1,067 mm (3 ft 6 in)

The original full-production version introduced on both the Keihin–Tōhoku—Negishi (78 ten-car sets numbered 1–78) and Nambu (2 six-car sets numbered 1 and 32) lines in 1993. Six-door SaHa 208 cars were inserted into the Keihin–Tōhoku—Negishi Line sets in 1995.

The 209 series trains on the Keihin–Tōhoku—Negishi Line were replaced by new E233-1000 series trains from autumn 2007, with the last sets withdrawn by 24 January 2010. A large number of these units were subsequently rebuilt as 209-2000/2100 series four-car and six-car sets for use in the Chiba area, while some were converted as training sets, MUE-Train, or 209-2200 series sets for the Nambu Line.

=== Formations ===
==== Keihin–Tōhoku—Negishi Line 10-car sets ====
Previously, 78 ten-car sets (1–78) were based at Urawa depot and were formed as shown below, with four motored ("M") cars and six non-powered trailer ("T") cars.

	← Ōmiya Ōfuna →									
Car No.	10	9	8	7	6	5	4	3	2	1
Designation	Tc	T	M	M'	T'	T		M	M'	Tc'
Numbering	KuHa 209	SaHa 209	MoHa 209	MoHa 208	SaHa 208	SaHa 209		MoHa 209	MoHa 208	KuHa 208

- Cars 3 and 8 were each equipped with one PS28 pantograph.
- Car 6 was a "6-door" car with six pairs of doors on each side.

==== Nambu Line 6-car sets ====
Previously, two six-car sets (1 and 32) were based at Nakahara Depot and were formed as shown below, with four motored ("M") cars and two non-powered trailer ("T") cars.

	← Kawasaki Tachikawa →					
Car No.	1	2	3	4	5	6
Designation	Tc	M	M'	M	M'	Tc'
Numbering	KuHa 209	MoHa 209	MoHa 208	MoHa 209	MoHa 208	KuHa 208

- Cars 2 and 4 were each equipped with one PS28 lozenge-type pantograph.
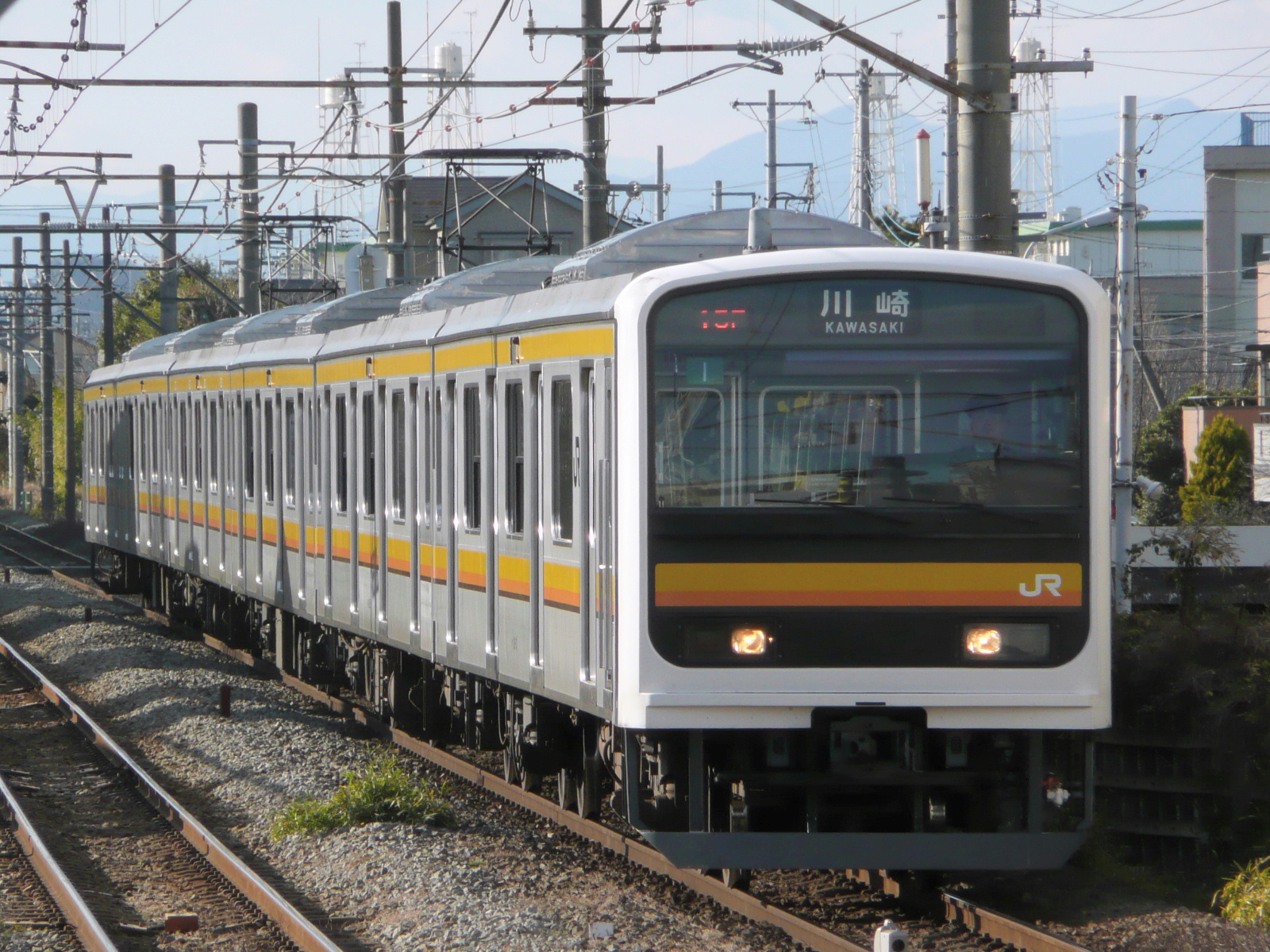
A Nambu Line 6-car 209-0 series train in January 2008

== 209-500 series ==
209-500 series
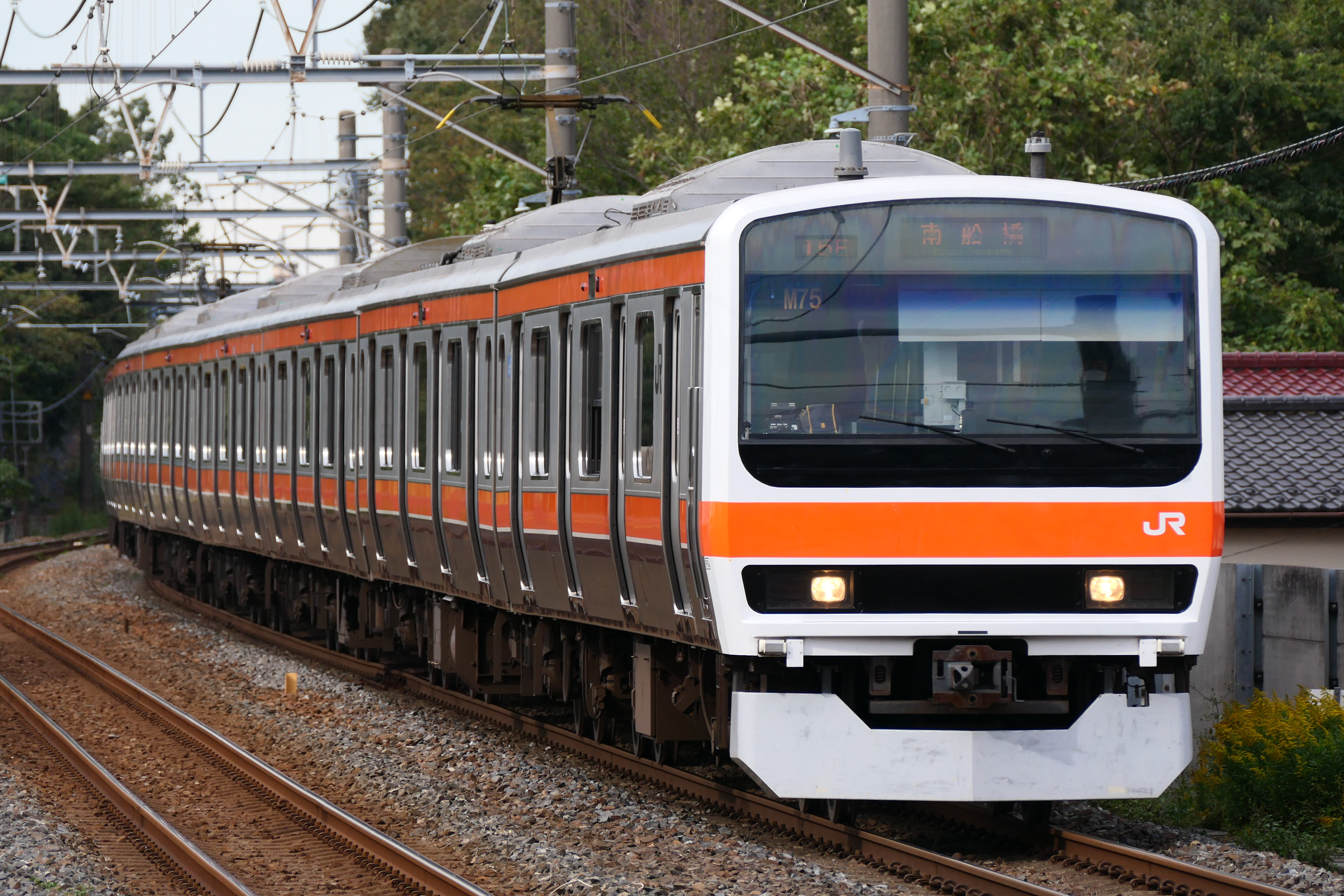
- Musashino Line 209-500 series set M75 on a Local service in October 2019
- In service: 1998–present
- Replaced: 103 series, 201 series, 205 series
- Constructed: 1998–2000
- Entered service: 29 December 1998
- Refurbished: 2016–2019
- Scrapped: 2017–
- Number built: 170 vehicles
- Number in service: 98 vehicles (12 sets) (+20 vehicles converted to 209-3500 series)
- Number scrapped: 52 vehicles
- Formation: 8/10 cars per trainset
- Fleet numbers: Keiyō Line: 34; Musashino Line: M71-M77, M81-M84
- Operator: JR East
- Depots: Keiyō; Previously: Mitaka, Narashino, Urawa
- Lines served: Keiyō Line, Musashino Line, Sotobō Line, Uchibō Line; Previously: Chūō–Sōbu Line, Keihin–Tōhoku Line, Negishi Line

Specifications
- Car body construction: Stainless steel
- Width: 2,950 mm (9 ft 8 in)
- Doors: 4 pairs per side
- Traction system: IGBT-VVVF (Mitsubishi); Previously: GTO-VVVF
- Electric system: 1,500 V DC overhead catenary
- Track gauge: 1,067 mm (3 ft 6 in)

This sub-series represented a stop-gap for use from 1998 on the Chūō–Sōbu Line until the full-production E231 series trains were delivered, and a total of 17 ten-car sets (numbered 51–67) were delivered to Narashino Depot in Chiba. These sets differ noticeably from the other 209 series variants in having 2.95 m (9 ft 8 in) wide cars (compared to 2.87 m (9 ft 5 in) for earlier flat-sided stock), as well as LED destination indicators, replacing the earlier roller blind type. While externally similar in appearance to the later E231 series sets, the 209-500 series are distinguishable by their white cab fronts and lack of six-door cars.

In November 2000, two sets (66 and 67) were transferred to the Keihin–Tōhoku—Negishi Line and renumbered 80 and 81. In December 2003, the Chūō–Sōbu Line sets were reallocated to Mitaka Depot and renumbered 501–515. Between 2005 and 2006, set 515 was lent to the Keihin–Tōhoku—Negishi Line as a spare during car maintenance. Between 2006 and 2007, three more sets (513–515) were transferred to the Keihin–Tōhoku—Negishi Line to replace the prototype 209-900/910/920 series trains and renumbered 82–84. From October 2008, following the introduction of E233-1000 series trains on the Keihin–Tōhoku—Negishi Line, one set (80) was transferred back to the Chūō–Sōbu Line (as set 516) while the other four sets (81–84) were modified (with ATS-P/S_{N} instead of ATC) and transferred to the Keiyō Line (as sets 31–34).

From September 2010 to January 2011, three former Keiyō Line sets (31–33) were reduced to eight cars and reliveried for use on the Musashino Line, renumbered M71–M73, and entered service from 4 December 2010. In 2012, a "C" suffix was added to all Chūō–Sōbu Line sets (C501–C512 and C516).

From 2018, five Chūō–Sōbu Line sets (C501–C505) were converted to 4-car 209-3500 series sets for use on Kawagoe Line and Hachikō Line services, while the remaining eight sets (C506–C512 and C516) were reduced to 8 cars and reallocated to the Musashino Line and renumbered M74–M77 and M81–M84. The last Chūō–Sōbu Line set, set C511, was withdrawn from service on 19 April 2019.

All sets were refurbished between 2016 and 2019, when the GTO-VVVF traction system was replaced with an IGBT-VVVF traction system.

=== Set transfer history ===
The following table shows the transfer history for each of the 17 sets.

	1998–2018						2018–present
501–505 (5 sets)	Chūō–Sōbu Line; 51–55→501–505→C501–C505						Converted to 209-3500 series for Hachikō/Kawagoe Line
	1999–2018						2018–present
506–509 (4 sets)	Chūō–Sōbu Line; 56–59→506–509→C506–C509						Musashino Line; M81–M84
	1999–2019						2019–present
510–512 (3 sets)	Chūō–Sōbu Line; 60–62→510–512→C510–C512						Musashino Line; M75–M77
	2000–2006			2006–2008	2008–2010		2010–present
513–514 (2 sets)	Chūō–Sōbu Line; 63–64→513–514			Keihin–Tōhoku Line; 82–83	Keiyō Line; 31–32		Musashino Line; M71–M72
	2000–2005	2005–2006	2006	2006–2008	2008–2010		2010–present
515	Chūō–Sōbu Line; 65→515	Keihin–Tōhoku Line; 515	Chūō–Sōbu Line; 515	Keihin–Tōhoku Line; 84	Keiyō Line; 33		Musashino Line; M73
	2000	2001–2009				2009–2018	2018–present
516	Chūō–Sōbu Line; 66	Keihin–Tōhoku Line; 80				Chūō–Sōbu Line; 516→C516	Musashino Line; M74
	2000	2001–2008			2009–present		
517	Chūō–Sōbu Line; 67	Keihin–Tōhoku Line; 81			Keiyō Line; 34		

=== Formations ===
==== 10-car sets ====
As of 1 October 2018, one set (34) is allocated to Keiyō Depot for use on the Keiyō Line (and through services to the Sotobō and Uchibō Lines). The set is formed as follows with four motored ("M") cars and six non-powered trailer ("T") cars.

	← Kazusa-Minato, Kazusa-Ichinomiya, Kimitsu, Soga Tokyo →									
Car No.	10	9	8	7	6	5	4	3	2	1
Designation	Tc	T	M	M'	T			M	M'	Tc'
Numbering	KuHa 209-500	SaHa 209-500	MoHa 209-500	MoHa 208-500	SaHa 209-500			MoHa 209-500	MoHa 208-500	KuHa 208-500

- Cars 3 and 8 each have one single-arm pantograph.
- Cars 1 and 10 have a wheelchair space.
- Car 4 is designated as a mildly air-conditioned car.

==== 8-car sets ====
As of 1 January 2020, 11 eight-car sets (M71 to M77, M81 to M84) were allocated to Keiyō Depot for use on Musashino Line (and through services to the Keiyō Line). These sets are formed as follows with four motored ("M") cars and four non-powered trailer ("T") cars.

	← Tokyo, Kaihinmakuhari, Nishi-Funabashi Fuchūhommachi →							
Car No.	1	2	3	4	5	6	7	8
Designation	Tc	M	M'	T		M	M'	Tc'
Numbering	KuHa 209-500	MoHa 209-500	MoHa 208-500	SaHa 209-500		MoHa 209-500	MoHa 208-500	KuHa 208-500

- Cars 2 and 6 each have one pantograph (single-arm on sets M71–M77, lozenge-type on sets M81– M84).
- Cars 1 and 8 have a wheelchair space.
- Car 4 is designated as a mildly air-conditioned car.

=== Previous formations ===
==== Chūō–Sōbu Line 10-car sets (1998 to 2019) ====
	← Chiba, Tsudanuma Nakano, Mitaka →									
Car No.	1	2	3	4	5	6	7	8	9	10
Designation	Tc	T	M	M'	T			M	M'	Tc'
Numbering	KuHa 209-500	SaHa 209-500	MoHa 209-500	MoHa 208-500	SaHa 209-500			MoHa 209-500	MoHa 208-500	KuHa 208-500

==== Keihin–Tōhoku—Negishi Line 10-car sets (2001 to 2009) ====
	← Ōmiya Ōfuna →									
Car No.	10	9	8	7	6	5	4	3	2	1
Designation	Tc	T	M	M'	T			M	M'	Tc'
Numbering	KuHa 209-500	SaHa 209-500	MoHa 209-500	MoHa 208-500	SaHa 209-500			MoHa 209-500	MoHa 208-500	KuHa 208-500

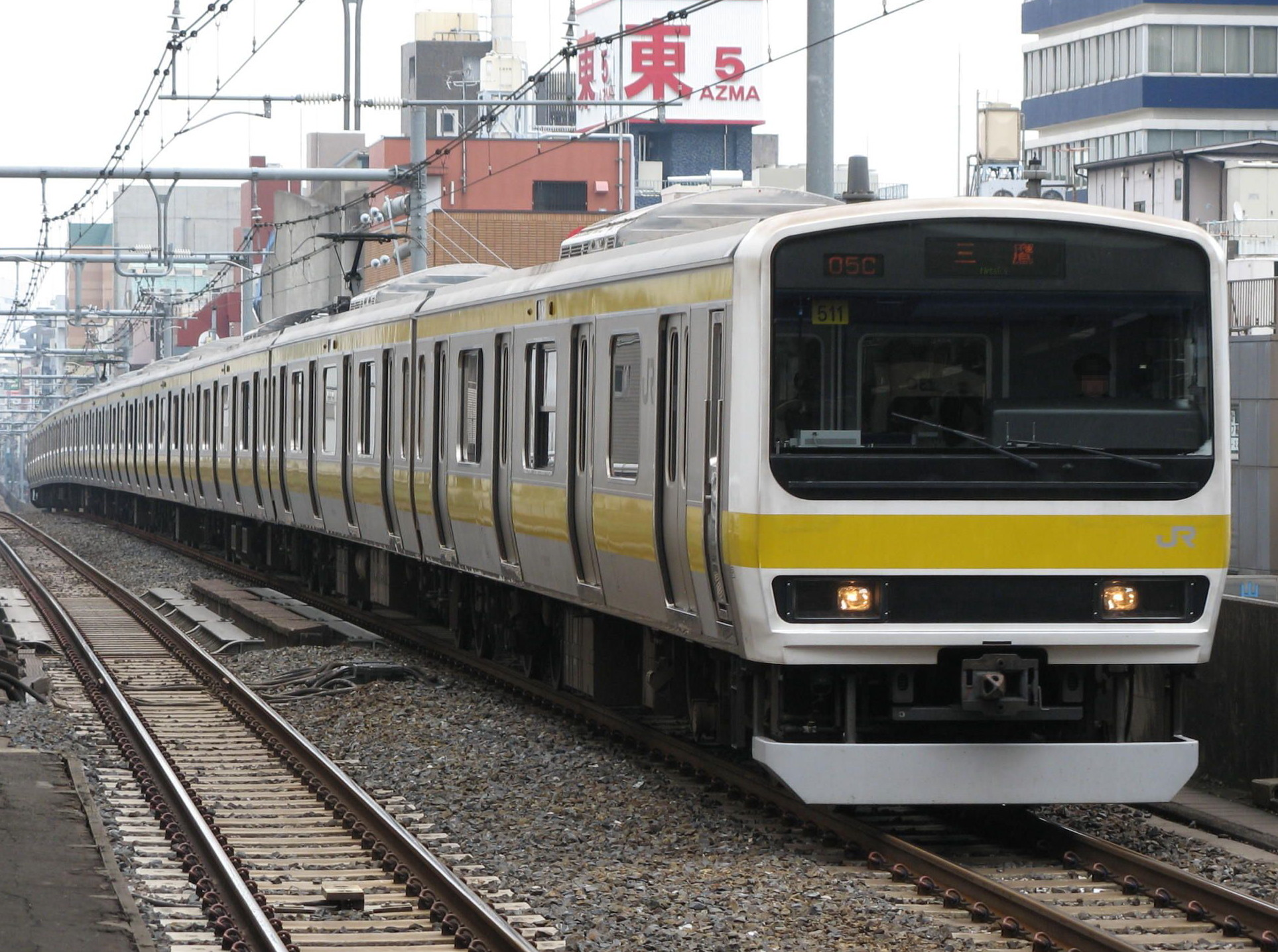
A Chūō–Sōbu Line 209-500 series train at Akihabara station in April 2009

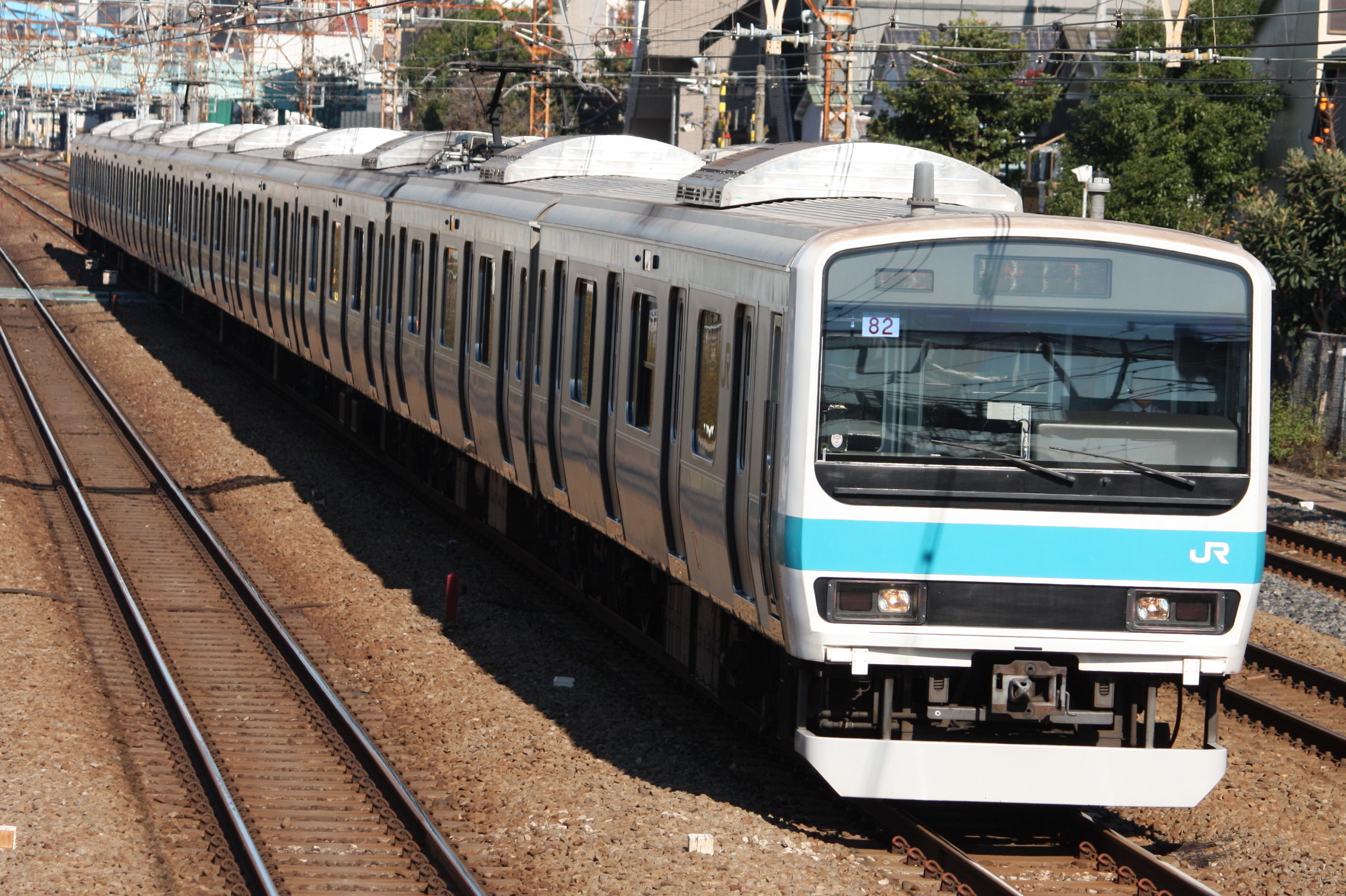
A Keihin–Tōhoku—Negishi Line 209-500 series in November 2008

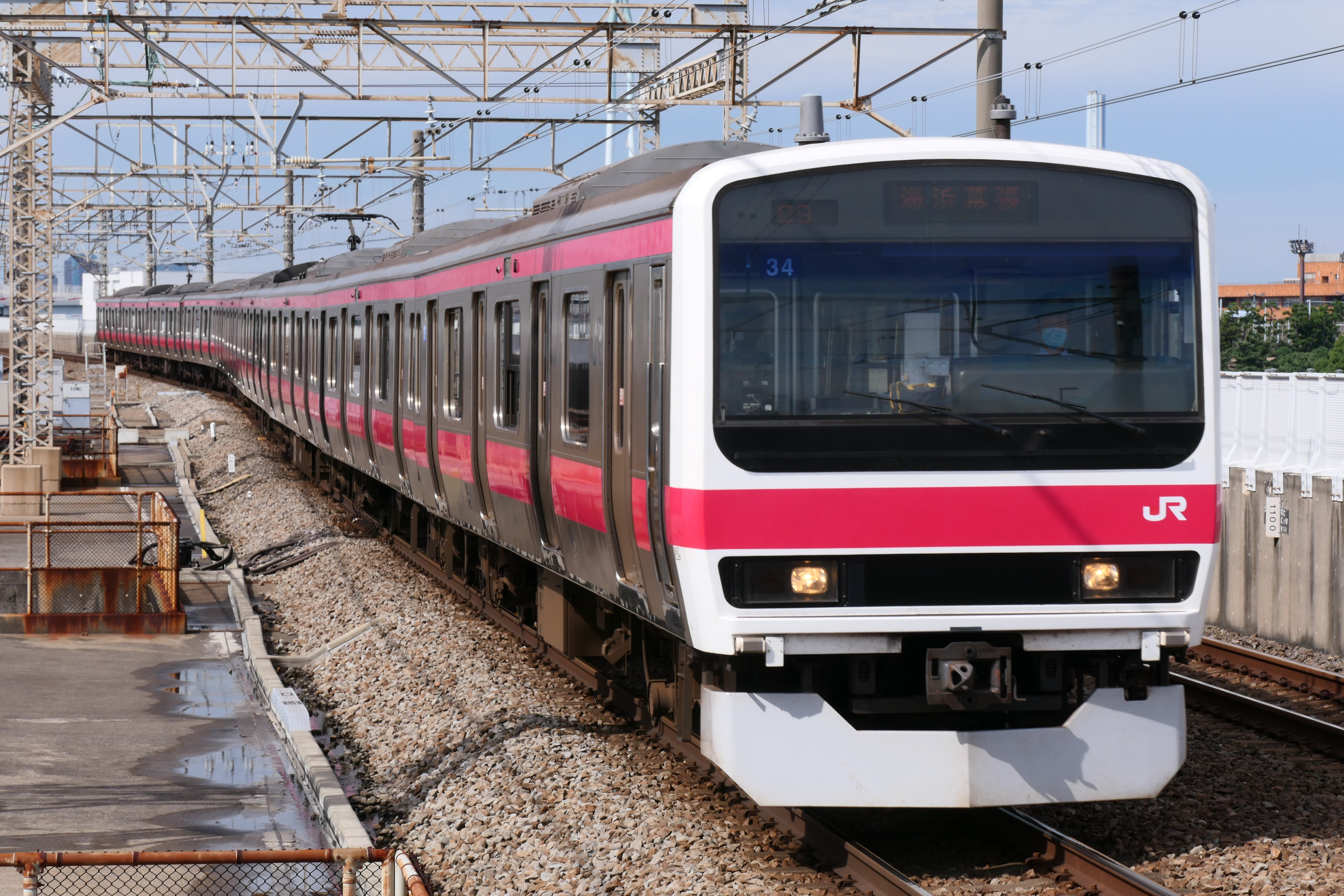
A Keiyō Line 209-500 series in October 2020

== 209-900/910/920 series ==
209-900/910/920 series
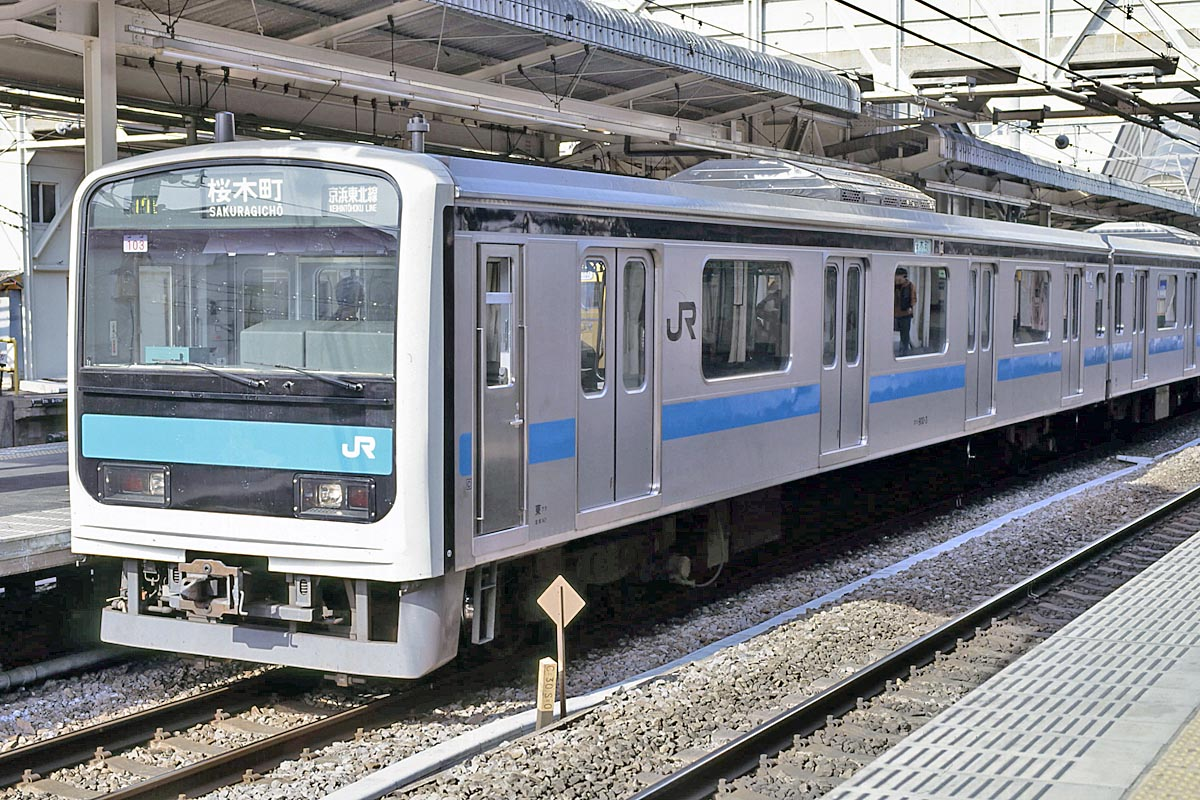
- 901 series Set C (later 209-920 series) in March 1993
- In service: 1992–2007
- Constructed: 1992
- Entered service: 7 May 1992
- Scrapped: 2007–2008
- Number built: 30 vehicles
- Number preserved: 1 vehicle (at Tōkyō General Rolling Stock Center)
- Number scrapped: 29 vehicles
- Formation: 10 cars per trainset
- Operator: JR East
- Depot: Urawa
- Lines served: Keihin–Tōhoku Line, Negishi Line

Specifications
- Car body construction: Stainless steel
- Width: 2,870 mm (9 ft 5 in)
- Doors: 4 pairs per side
- Electric system: 1,500 V DC overhead catenary
- Track gauge: 1,067 mm (3 ft 6 in)

Three ten-car prototypes were built in 1992 for testing and passenger evaluation on the Keihin–Tōhoku—Negishi Line, initially classified as 901 series. Set A was built by Kawasaki Heavy Industries, set B by Tokyu Car Corporation, and set C was built by Kawasaki Heavy Industries and JR East's Ōfuna factory (cars 4 and 5). The three sets incorporated a number of different design features for evaluation, but were converted in 1994 to bring them in line with the full-production specifications. Set A became 209-900 series set 90, set B became 209-910 series set 91, and set C became 209-920 series set 92. They differed from the full-production 209-0 series sets in not having six-door SaHa 208 cars.

209-910 series set 91 was withdrawn in December 2006, and the last of the three prototype sets, set 90, was withdrawn in August 2007. Car KuHa 209-901 from the original 901 series set A was stored at Nagano Works, and later preserved at Tōkyō General Rolling Stock Center.

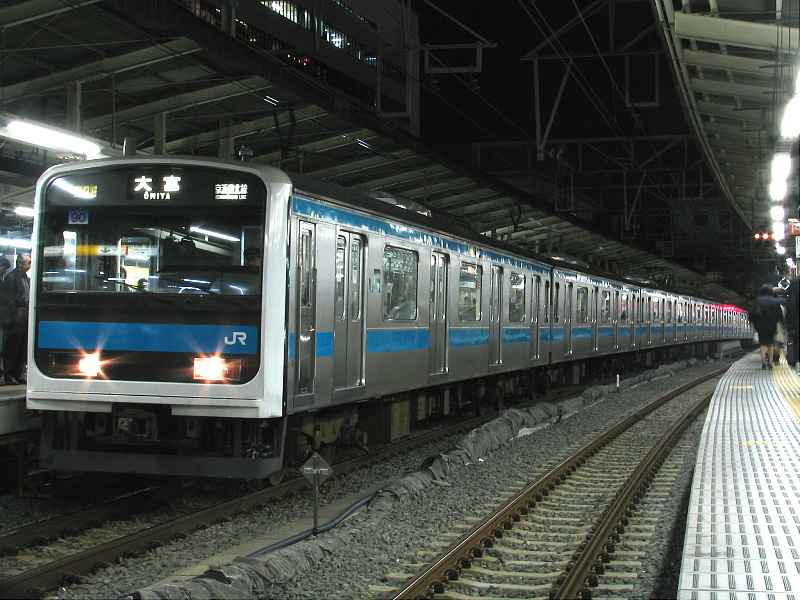
209-900 series set 90 in November 2006

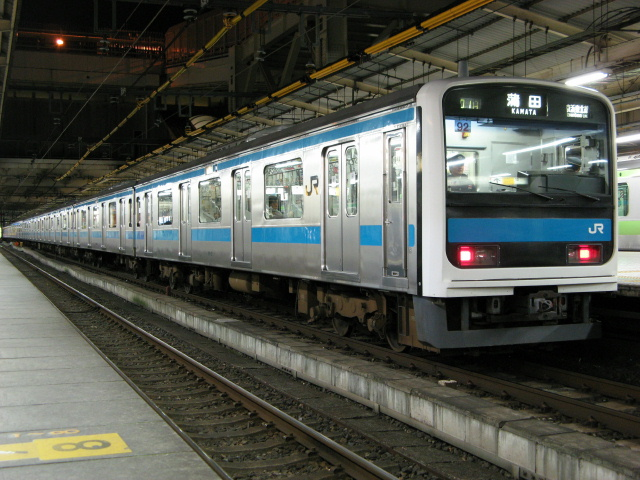
209-920 series set 92 in January 2007

=== Formation ===
	← Ōmiya Ōfuna →									
Car No.	10	9	8	7	6	5	4	3	2	1
Designation	Tc	T	M	M'	T			M	M'	Tc'
Numbering (1992 to 1994)	KuHa 901	SaHa 901	MoHa 901	MoHa 900	SaHa 901			MoHa 901	MoHa 900	KuHa 900
Numbering (1994 to 2007)	KuHa 209-900	SaHa 209-900	MoHa 209-900	MoHa 208-900	SaHa 208-900	SaHa 209-900		MoHa 209-900	MoHa 208-900	KuHa 208-900
Numbering (1994 to 2007)	KuHa 209-910	SaHa 209-910	MoHa 209-910	MoHa 208-910	SaHa 208-910	SaHa 209-910		MoHa 209-910	MoHa 208-910	KuHa 208-910
Numbering (1994 to 2007)	KuHa 209-920	SaHa 209-920	MoHa 209-920	MoHa 208-920	SaHa 208-920	SaHa 209-920		MoHa 209-920	MoHa 208-920	KuHa 208-920

== 209-950 series ==
This was the original classification given to the prototype E231 series 10-car set delivered in October 1998, to test out the then-new insulated-gate bipolar transistor (IGBT) traction system and TIMS passenger information system. It was reclassified as E231-900 series in June 2000 following conversion to the full-production E231 standard.

== 209-1000 series ==
209-1000 series
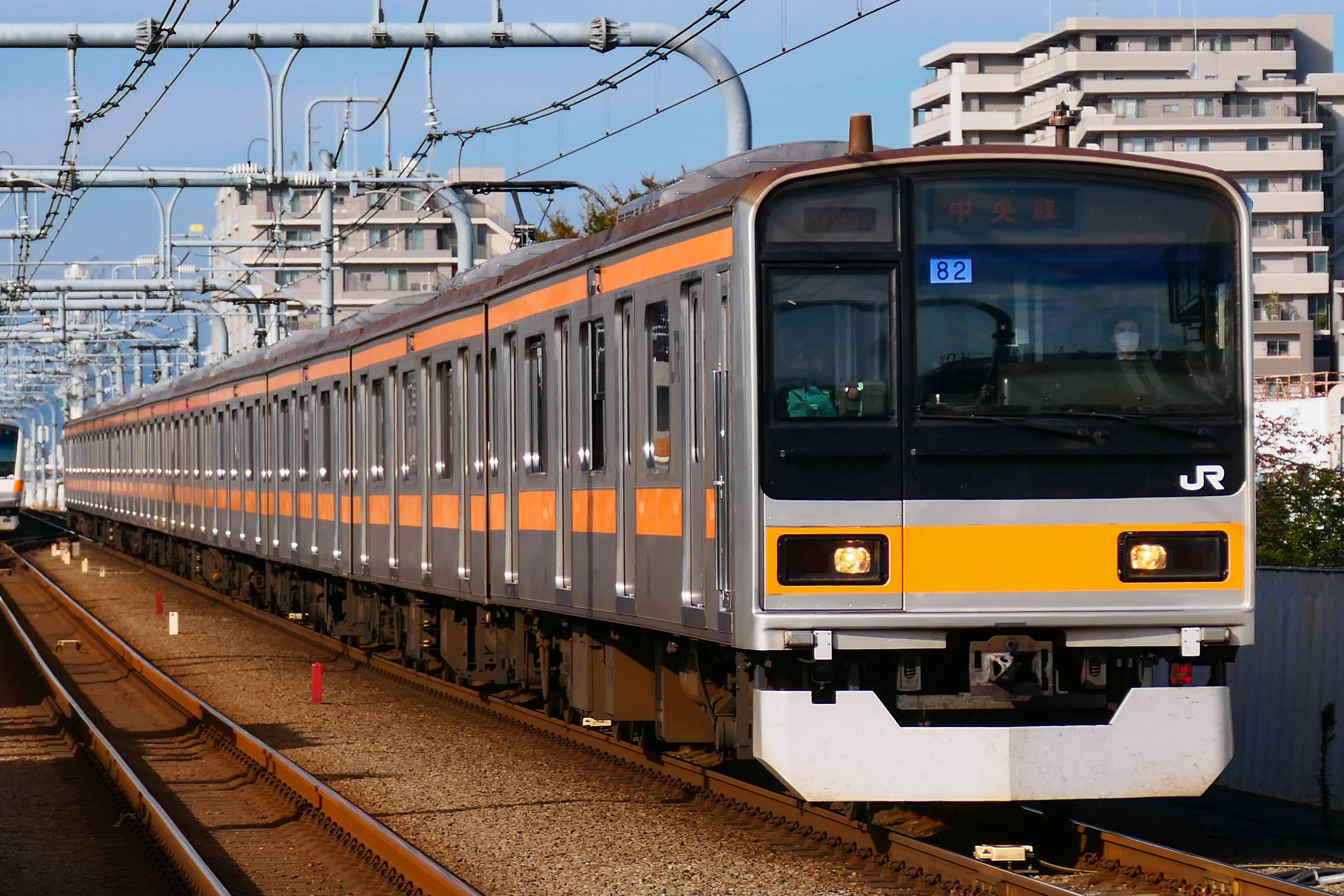
- A Chūō Line (Rapid) 10-car 209-1000 series set in November 2022 near Musashi-Sakai
- In service: 1999–2024
- Constructed: 1999
- Entered service: December 1999
- Number built: 20 vehicles (2 sets)
- Number in service: 0 vehicles
- Number scrapped: 20 vehicles (2 sets)
- Formation: 10 cars per trainset
- Fleet numbers: 81–82
- Operator: JR East
- Depots: Toyoda (2019-2024); Matsudo (1999-2018)
- Lines served: Chūō Line (Rapid), Ōme Line, Jōban Line, Tokyo Metro Chiyoda Line

Specifications
- Car body construction: Stainless steel
- Width: 2,870 mm (9 ft 5 in)
- Doors: 4 pairs per side
- Traction system: GTO-VVVF (Mitsubishi)
- Electric system: 1,500 V DC overhead catenary
- Track gauge: 1,067 mm (3 ft 6 in)

Two 10-car sets (81 and 82) were delivered from Tokyu Car Corporation in August and September 1999, entering service from 4 December 1999 on Jōban Line and Tokyo Metro Chiyoda Line inter-running services. Based on the 209-0 series, these trains have end doors for use in emergencies inside tunnels. These sets were based at JR East's Matsudo depot. These train sets have since been withdrawn from the Jōban Line in October 2018 and reallocated to the Chūō Line (Rapid) in December 2018, being based at JR East's Toyoda Depot after the reallocation. Operations officially started on the Chūō Line in March 2019.

While these sets usually operate only between Tokyo and Takao, on rare occasions (such as a shortage of train sets due to an accident) they may operate as far as Ōtsuki, or on the Ōme Line as far as Ōme. Furthermore, unlike the E233 series in use, due to the lack of passenger-operated door controls, all doors open on these sets while in use on the Ōme Line.

After the introduction of 12-car E233-0 series sets with Green cars on the Chūō Line, these sets were withdrawn from service on 6 September 2024. Set 82 was locomotive-hauled to the Nagano General Rolling Stock Center in January 2025, followed by set 81 in February. Both sets were then scrapped on 7 April 2025.

=== Formation ===
==== 10-car Jōban Line sets (1999 to 2018) ====
	← Toride, Ayase Yoyogi-Uehara →									
Car No.	10	9	8	7	6	5	4	3	2	1
Designation	Tc	M	M'	T	M	M'	T	M	M'	Tc'
Numbering	KuHa 209-1000	MoHa 209-1000	MoHa 208-1000	SaHa 209-1000	MoHa 209-1000	MoHa 208-1000	SaHa 209-1000	MoHa 209-1000	MoHa 208-1000	KuHa 208-1000

- Cars 3, 6 and 9 were originally fitted with PS21 lozenge type pantographs, but were converted to single-arm models in 2014.
- Cars 2 and 9 had wheelchair space.
- Car 4 was designated as a mildly air-conditioned car.

==== 10-car Chūō Line sets (2019 to 2024) ====
	← Tōkyō Ōtsuki →									
Car No.	1	2	3	4	5	6	7	8	9	10
Designation	Tc	M	M'	T	M	M'	T	M	M'	Tc'
Numbering	KuHa 209-1000	MoHa 209-1000	MoHa 208-1000	SaHa 209-1000	MoHa 209-1000	MoHa 208-1000	SaHa 209-1000	MoHa 209-1000	MoHa 208-1000	KuHa 208-1000

- Cars 2, 5 and 8 each had one single-arm pantograph.
- Cars 2 and 9 had wheelchair space.
- Car 4 was designated as a mildly air-conditioned car.
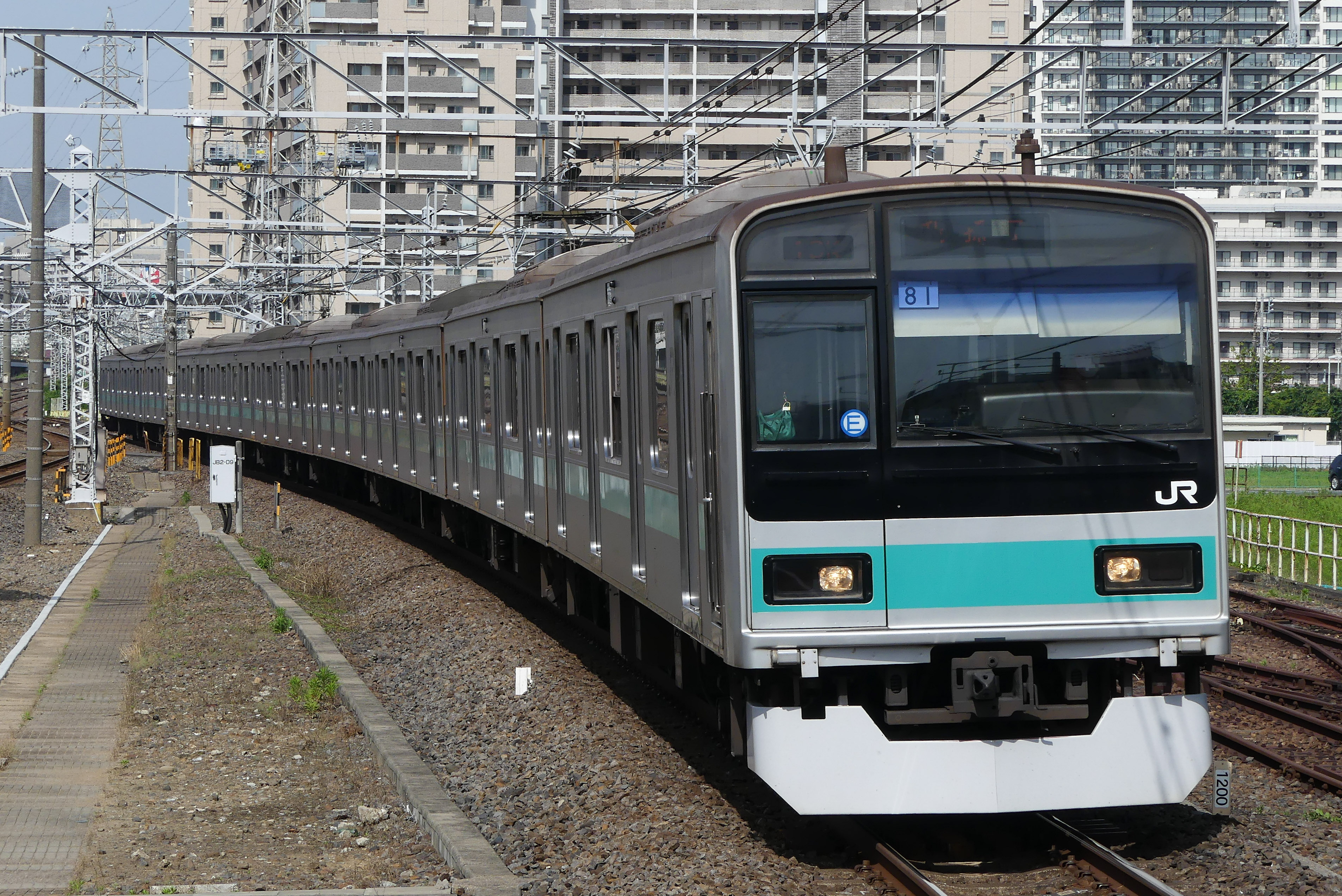
Set 81 in original Jōban Line livery, May 2018

=== Interior ===
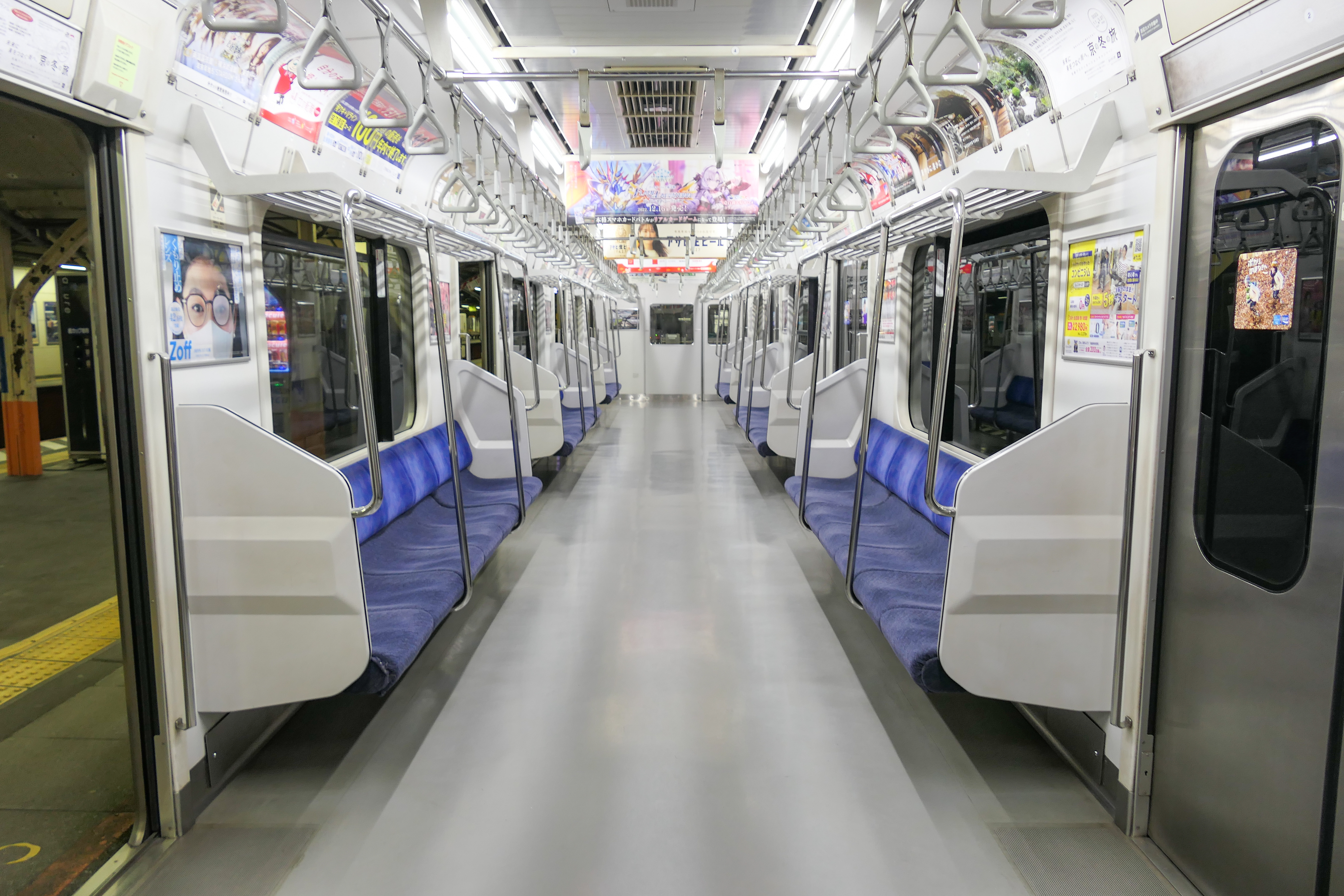
209-1000 series interior view in 27 December 2022

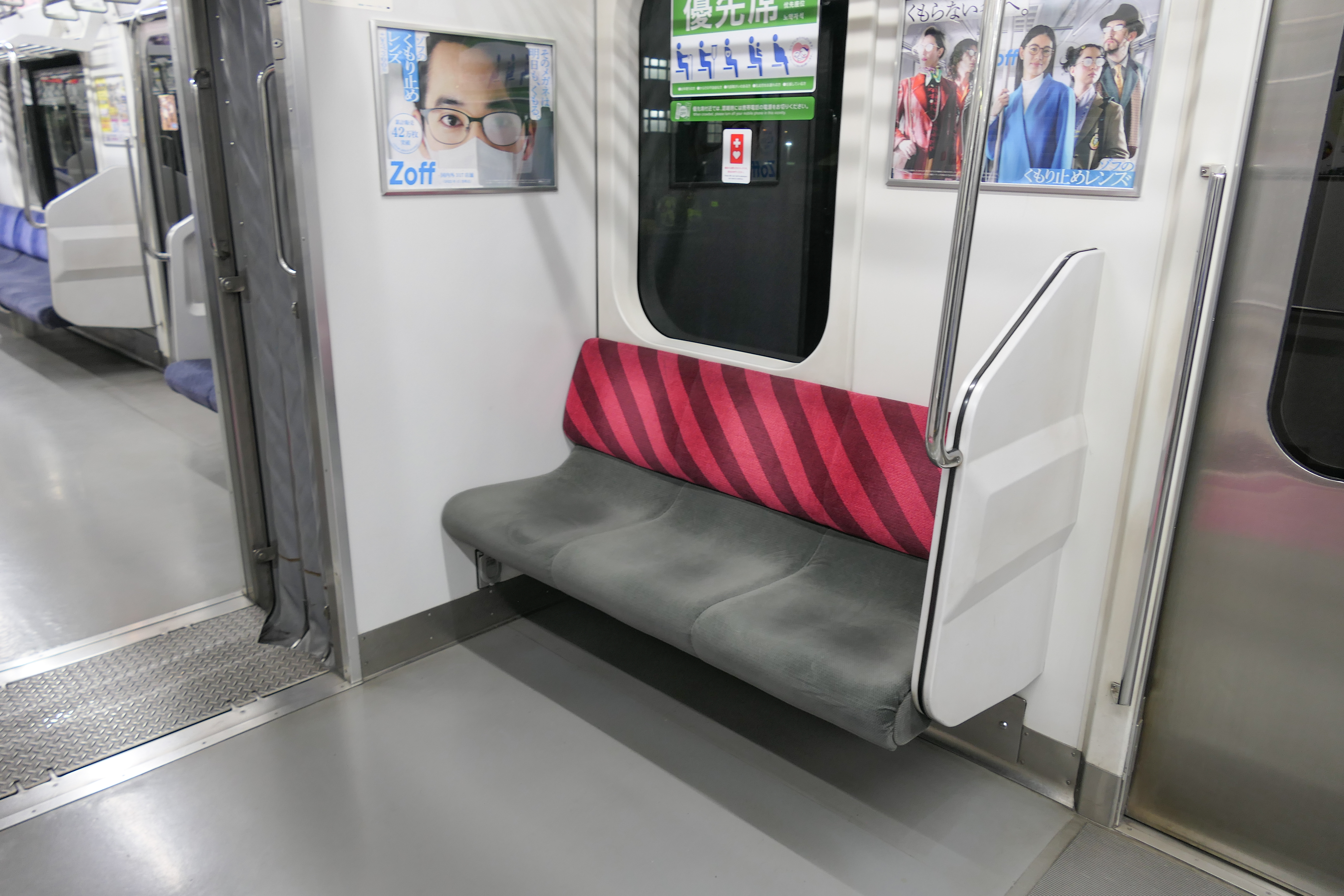
Priority seating in 27 December 2022

== 209-2000/2100 series ==
209-2000/2100 series
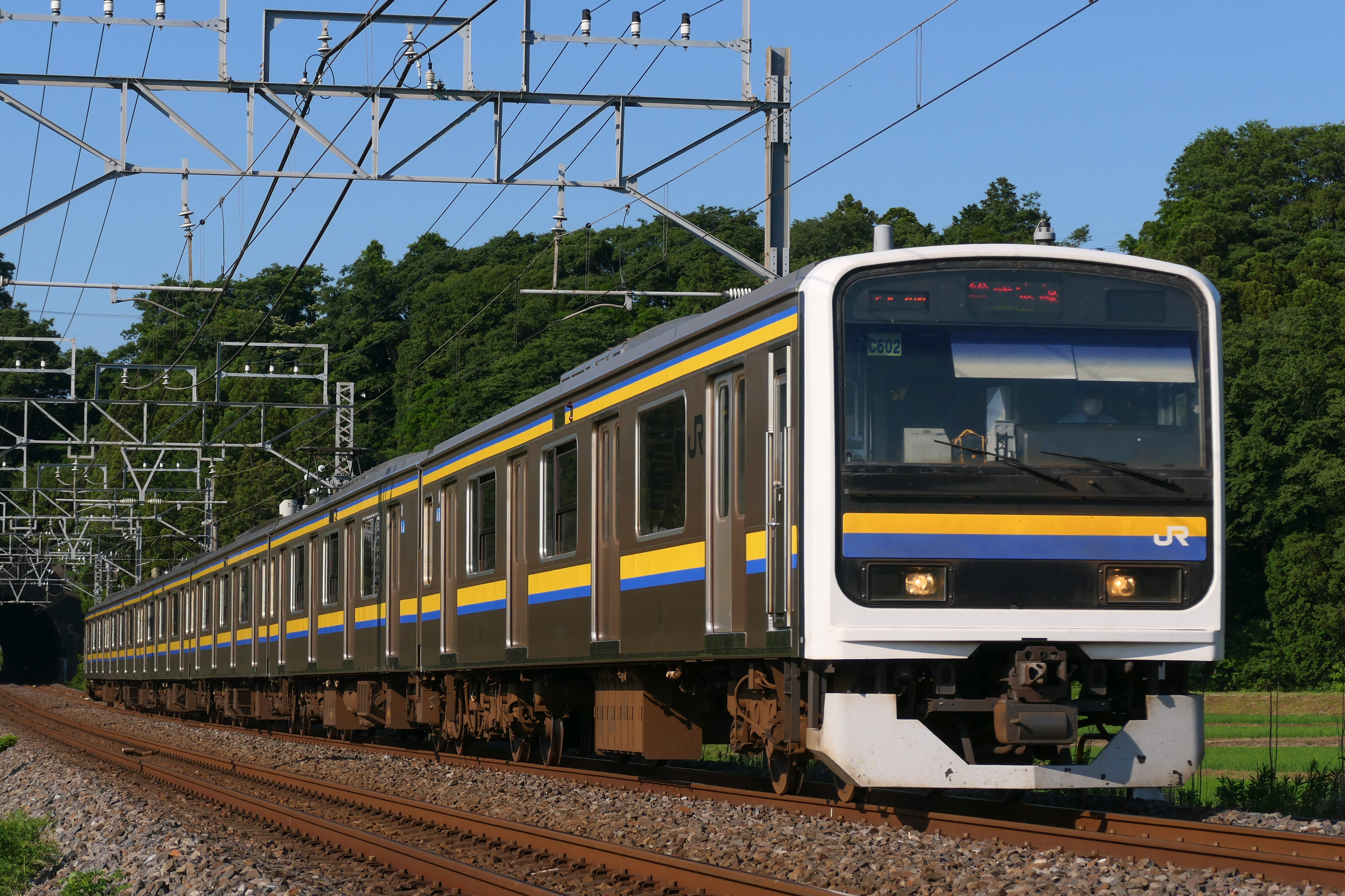
- A Chiba-area 209-2100 series 6-car train in June 2021
- In service: 2009–present
- Replaced: 211 series
- Entered service: 1 October 2009
- Refurbished: 2009–2013 (converted from 209-0 series)
- Number built: 324 vehicles
- Number in service: 276 vehicles (62 sets)
- Number preserved: 8 vehicles stored
- Number scrapped: 30 vehicles
- Successor: E131 series (rural services) E233 series
- Formation: 4/6 cars per trainset
- Fleet numbers: C401–C448, C602–C604, C606–C608, C610, C615, C617, C621–C625
- Operator: JR East
- Depot: Makuhari
- Lines served: Narita Line, Sōbu Main Line, Sotobō Line, Tōgane Line, Uchibō Line, Izu Kyūkō Line; Previously: Kashima Line

Specifications
- Car body construction: Stainless steel
- Width: 2,870 mm (9 ft 5 in)
- Doors: 4 pairs per side
- Traction system: Mitsubishi IGBT-VVVF
- Traction motors: MT73 (prior to conversion – MT68)
- Electric system: 1,500 V DC overhead catenary
- Track gauge: 1,067 mm (3 ft 6 in)

These are four- and six-car sets based at Makuhari Depot modified between 2009 and 2013 from former Keihin–Tōhoku—Negishi Line 209-0 series ten-car sets for use on Chiba area and Bōsō Peninsula local services from 1 October 2009 to replace ageing 211 series trains. Modifications include new electrical equipment, the addition of transverse seating to end cars, LED destination indicator panels, and a toilet. The cars are numbered in the -2100 series, although nine four-car sets have end cars numbered in the -2000 series. The -2000 series cars are converted from early batch 209-0 series units with air-operated doors rather than the electrically operated doors of later batch units.

The first four-car set (C417) was outshopped from Nagano Works in June 2009, while the first six-car set (C602) was outshopped from Ōmiya Works in July 2009. The entire conversion process was completed in 2013, and a total of 42 four-car sets (C401–C442) and 26 six-car sets (C601–C626) were formed.

From 13 March 2021, they were replaced on rural services with new E131 series trains. Six 6-car sets were shortened to 4-car sets between February and March 2021; the two surplus cars from each set along with three others 6-car sets (C612, C618, C626) were scrapped between April and May 2021.

In July 2021, 6-car set C609 was removed from JR service and delivered to Izukyū Corporation, and four cars from set C601 were delivered in November 2021. These sets entered service on 30 April 2022 as the Izukyu 3000 series.

This series will be replaced by E131 series 3-car and 6-car, and E233 series 6-car from October 2026 to March 2028. And then, JR lines on Chiba Prefecture will begin One-person operation excluding though-service from/to Tokyo and Limited Express service.

The table below shows the converted sets.

Former 6-car set	Conversion date	New 4-car set
C605	15 March 2021	C443
C611	4 March 2021	C444
C613	1 March 2021	C445
C614	22 March 2021	C446
C616	8 March 2021	C447
C620	24 February 2021	C448

=== Formations ===
==== 6-car sets ====
As of 22 December 2021, 14 six-car sets (C602–C604, C606–C608, C610, C615, C617, C621–C625) are based at Makuhari Depot and were formed as shown below, with four motored ("M") cars and two non-powered trailer ("T") cars.

	← Awa-Kamogawa, Chōshi Chiba →					
Car No.	6	5	4	3	2	1
Designation	Tc	M	M'	M	M'	Tc'
Numbering	KuHa 209-2100	MoHa 209-2100	MoHa 208-2100	MoHa 209-2100	MoHa 208-2100	KuHa 208-2100

- Cars 3 and 5 are each equipped with one lozenge-type pantograph.

==== 4-car sets ====
As of 24 March 2021, 48 four-car sets (C401–C448) are based at Makuhari Depot and were formed as shown below, with two motored ("M") cars and two non-powered trailer ("T") cars.

	← Awa-Kamogawa, Chōshi Chiba →			
Car No.	4	3	2	1
Designation	Tc	M	M'	Tc'
Numbering	KuHa 209-2000/2100	MoHa 209-2100	MoHa 208-2100	KuHa 208-2000/2100

- Car 3 is equipped with one lozenge-type pantograph.

=== Interior ===
Passenger accommodation consists primarily of longitudinal seating, with the end cars featuring some transverse seating bays. Car 2 is fitted with a toilet in all sets.

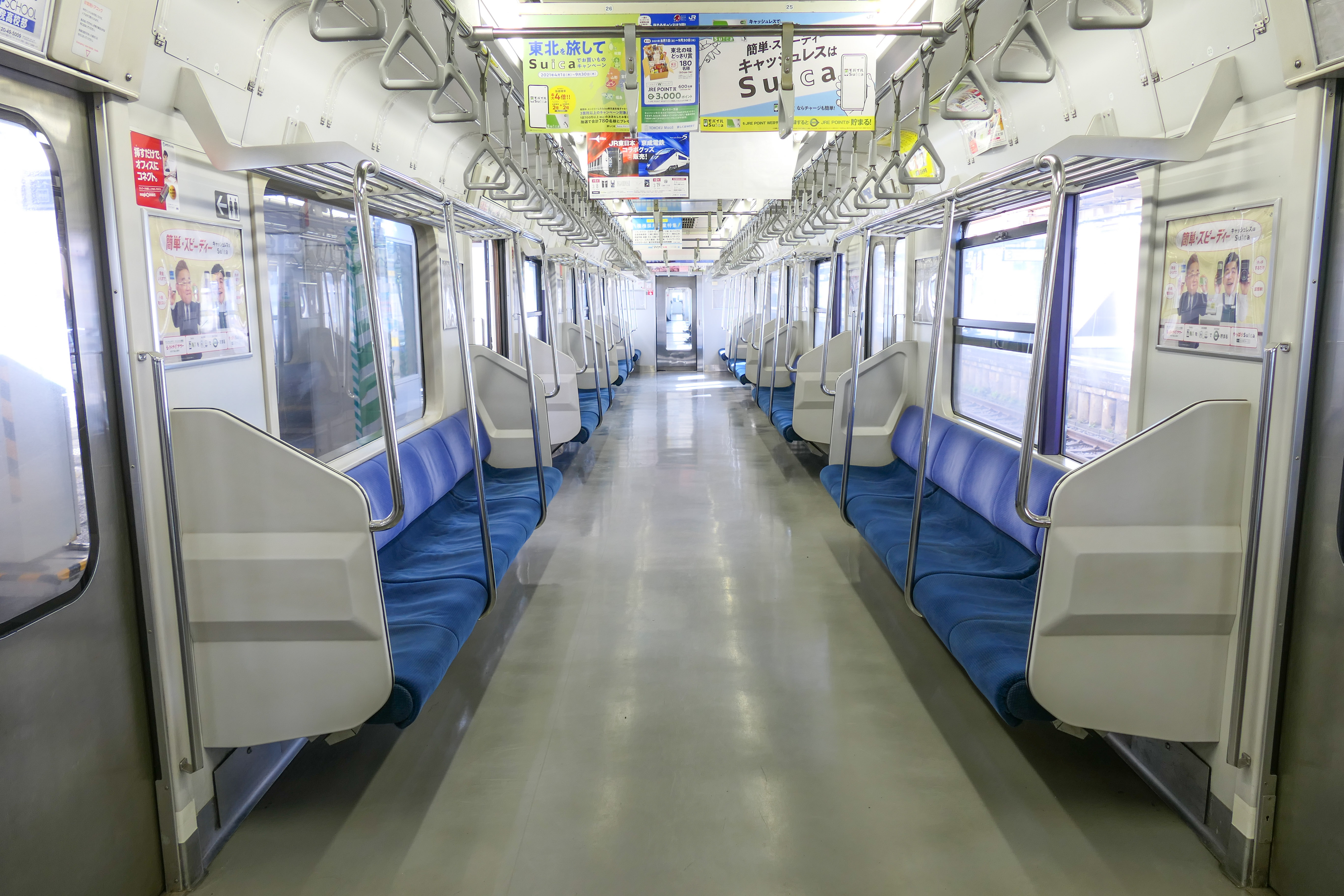
Interior of 209-2100 series car with longitudinal seating in March 2021

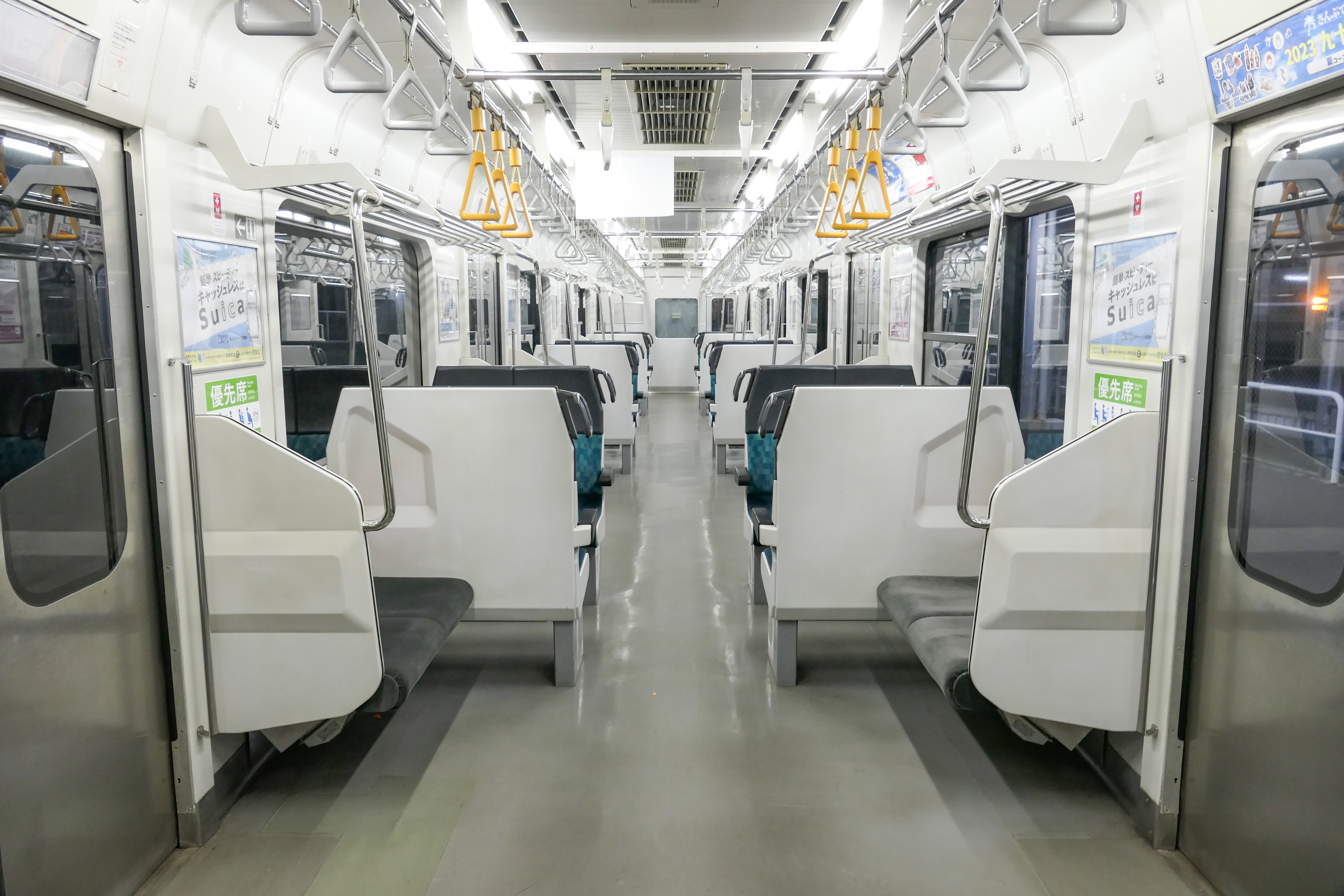
Interior of 209-2100 series car with transverse seating in 20 August 2023

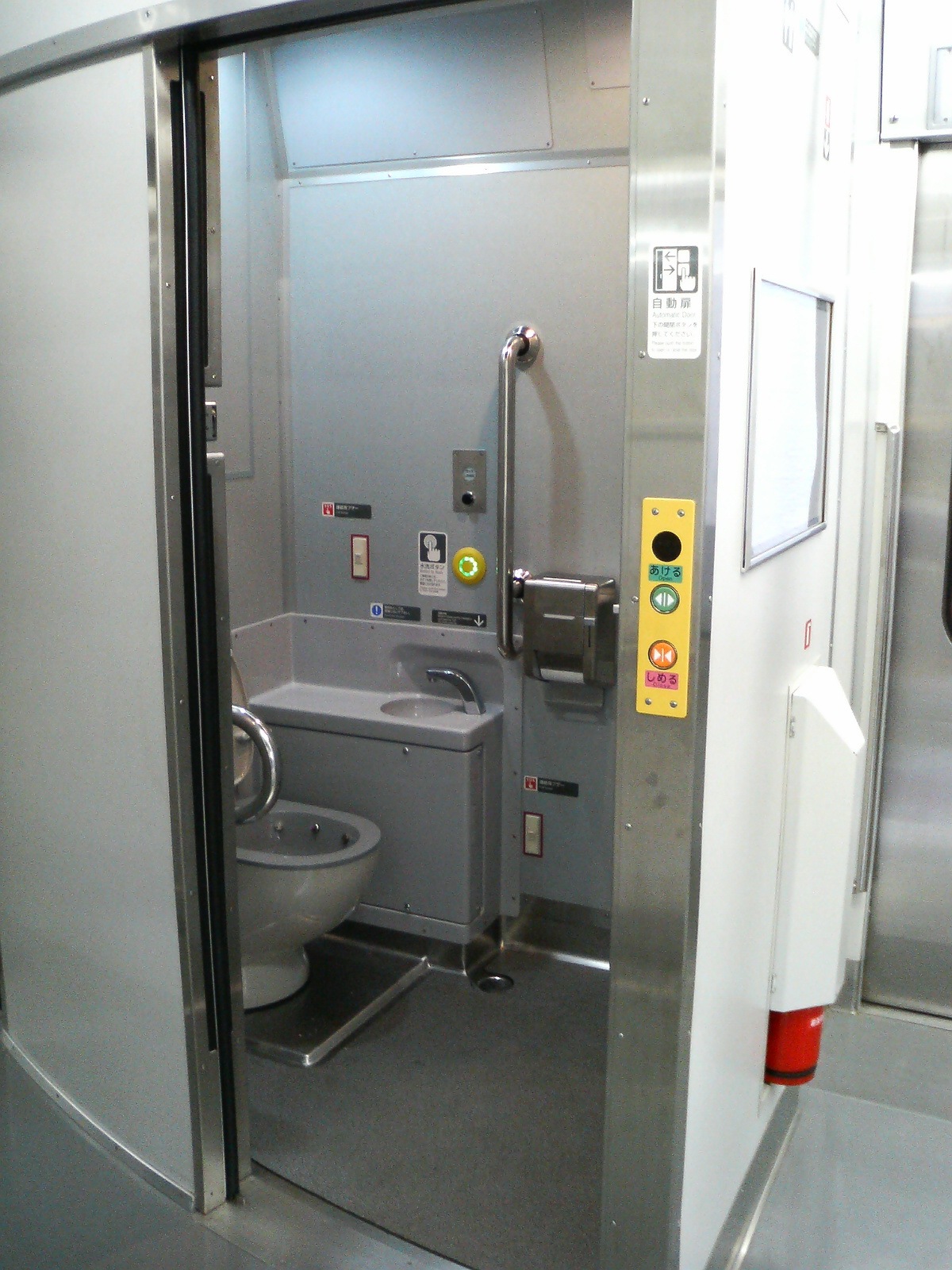
Toilet of a 209-2100 series set

== 209-2200 series ==
209-2200 series
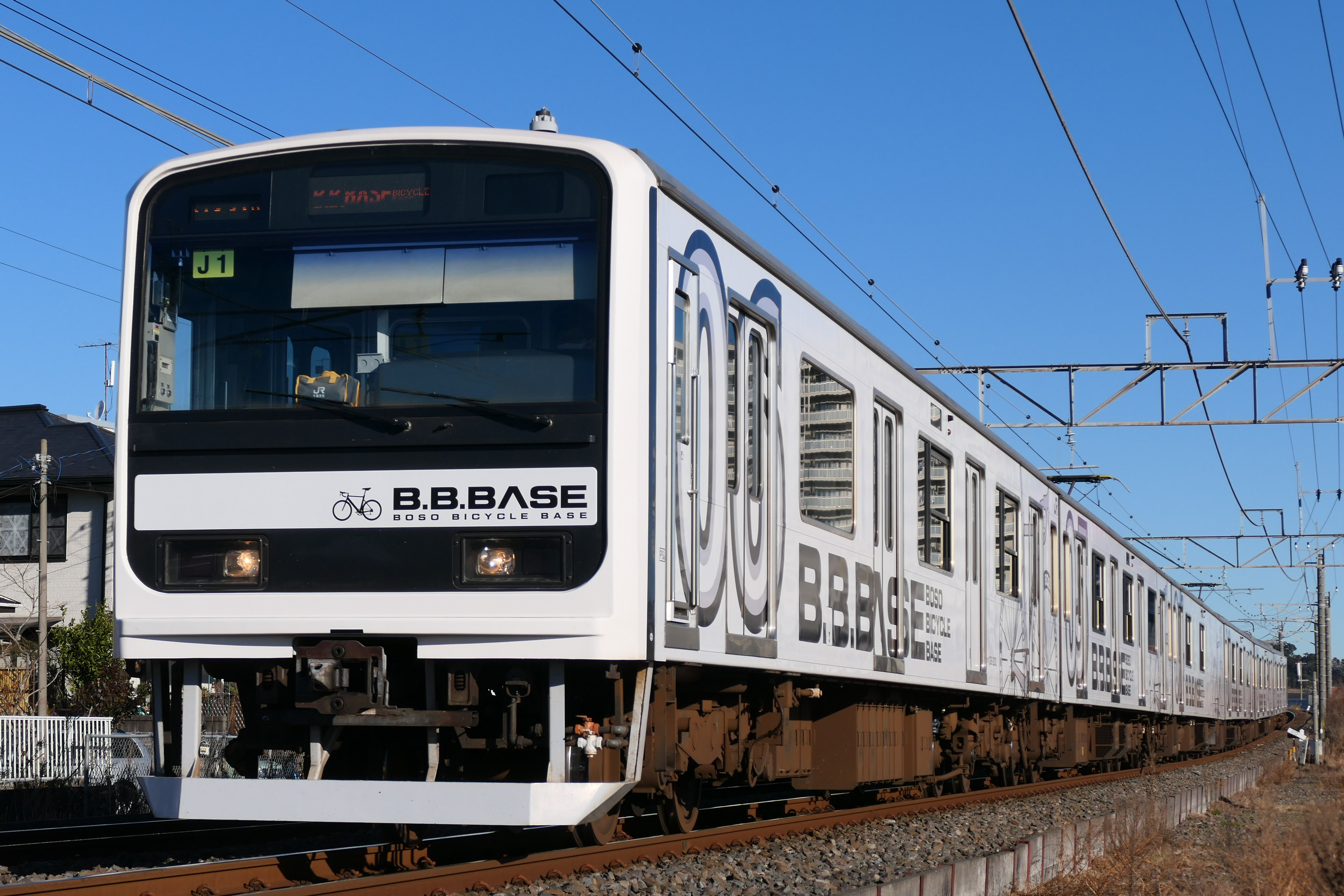
- 209-2200 series "B.B.Base" set J1 in January 2021
- In service: 2009–present
- Replaced: 209-0 series 205-1200 series
- Constructed: 1993–1995
- Entered service: Nambu Line: June 2009; B.B.Base: January 2018
- Refurbished: 2009–2010, 2017
- Scrapped: 2015
- Number built: 18 vehicles (3 sets)
- Number in service: 6 vehicles (1 set)
- Number scrapped: 12 vehicles (2 sets)
- Formation: 6 cars per trainset
- Fleet numbers: J1; Previously: 52–54
- Operator: JR East
- Depots: Makuhari; Previously: Nakahara
- Lines served: Uchibō Line, Sotobō Line, Narita Line, Sōbu Main Line; Previously: Nambu Line

Specifications
- Car body construction: Stainless steel
- Width: 2,870 mm (9 ft 5 in)
- Doors: 4 pairs per side
- Electric system: 1,500 V DC overhead catenary
- Track gauge: 1,067 mm (3 ft 6 in)

Between 2009 and 2010, three six-car sets were reformed from former Keihin–Tōhoku—Negishi Line 209-0 series ten-car sets for use on Nambu Line services, replacing the early-batch 209-0 series set and a 205-1200 series set. The first set, number 52, was outshopped in May 2009, and entered service on 12 June 2009. Modifications include new electrical equipment and the addition of LED destination indicator panels.

Two sets (52 and 54) were removed from service and replaced by new E233-8000 series trains in 2015. These two sets were scrapped.

The last remaining Nambu Line 209-2200 series trainset, set 53, was removed from services from 15 March 2017, being replaced by an E233-8500 series set. The set was modified for use as a train for carrying cyclists and their bicycles from Ryogoku in Tokyo to various destinations on the Uchibō Line, Sotobō Line, Narita Line, and Sōbu Main Line on the Bōsō Peninsula. Branded "B.B.Base" (an abbreviation for "Boso Bicycle Base"), it re-entered service on 6 January 2018.

=== Formation ===
==== B.B.Base 6-car set ====
One six-car set (J1) is based at Makuhari Depot and is formed as shown below, with four motored ("M") cars and two non-powered trailer ("T") cars.

	← Wadaura, Awa-Kamogawa, Chōshi, Sawara Ryōgoku →					
Car No.	6	5	4	3	2	1
Designation	Tc	M	M'	M	M'	Tc'
Numbering	KuHa 209-2200	MoHa 209-2200	MoHa 208-2200	MoHa 209-2200	MoHa 208-2200	KuHa 208-2200
Seating capacity	20	20	-	20	19	20

- Cars 3 and 5 each have one PS33F single-arm pantograph.
- Cars 1 to 3 and 5 to 6 have fixed seating bays arranged 2+1 abreast with cycle racks provided next to each of the doorways, while car 4 has an open configuration with bench seating on one side and a bar counter.
- Wheelchair-accessible toilets are provided in cars 2 and 4.

=== Previous formations ===
==== Nambu Line 6-car sets ====
Previously, three six-car sets (52–54) were based at Nakahara Depot and were formed as shown below, with four motored ("M") cars and two non-powered trailer ("T") cars.

	← Kawasaki Tachikawa →					
Car No.	1	2	3	4	5	6
Designation	Tc	M	M'	M	M'	Tc'
Numbering	KuHa 209-2200	MoHa 209-2200	MoHa 208-2200	MoHa 209-2200	MoHa 208-2200	KuHa 208-2200

- Cars 2 and 4 were each equipped with one PS28A lozenge-type pantograph.
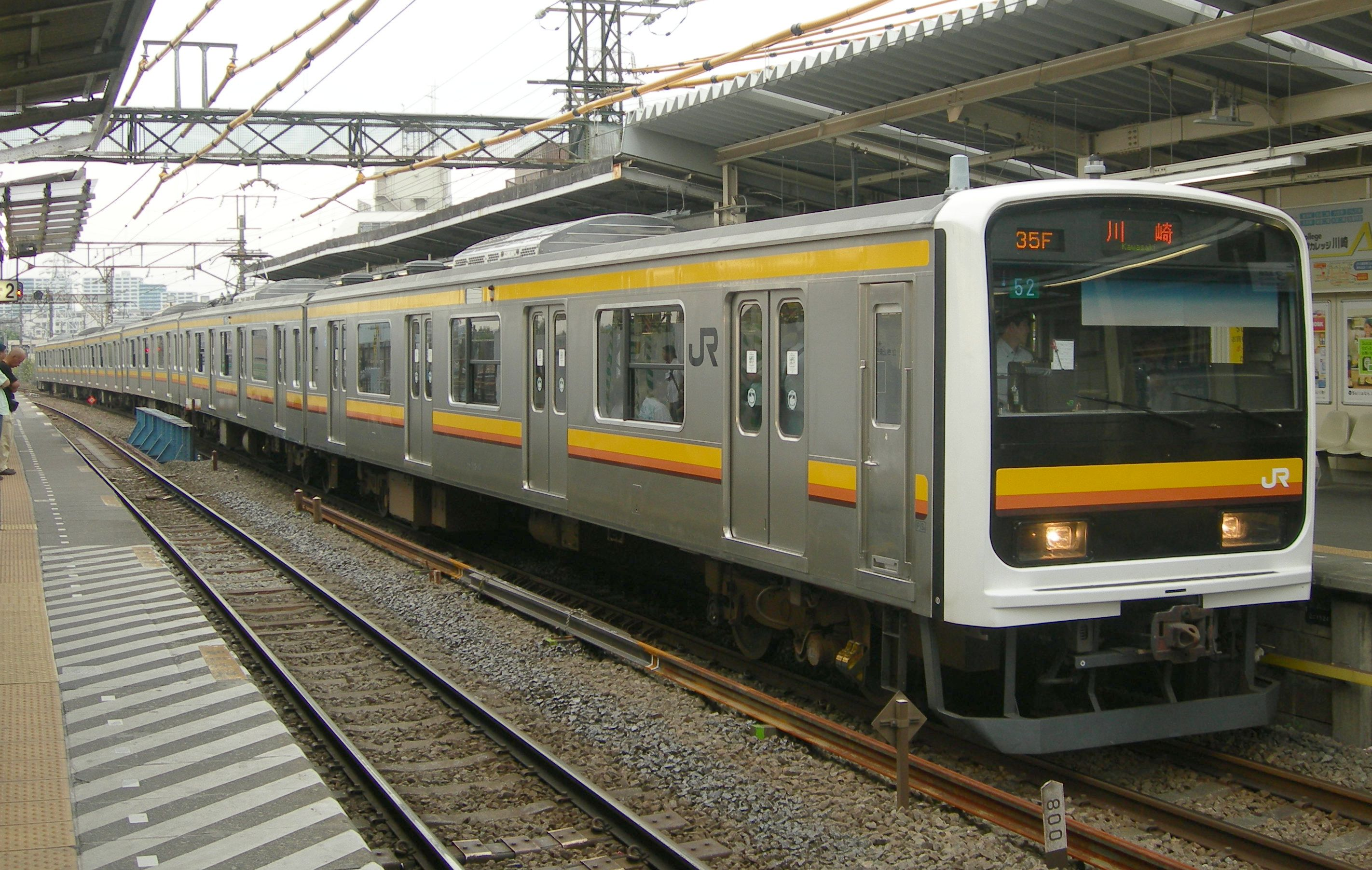
Nambu Line 209-2200 series set Naha52 at Shitte Station in September 2010

== 209-3000 series ==
209-3000 series
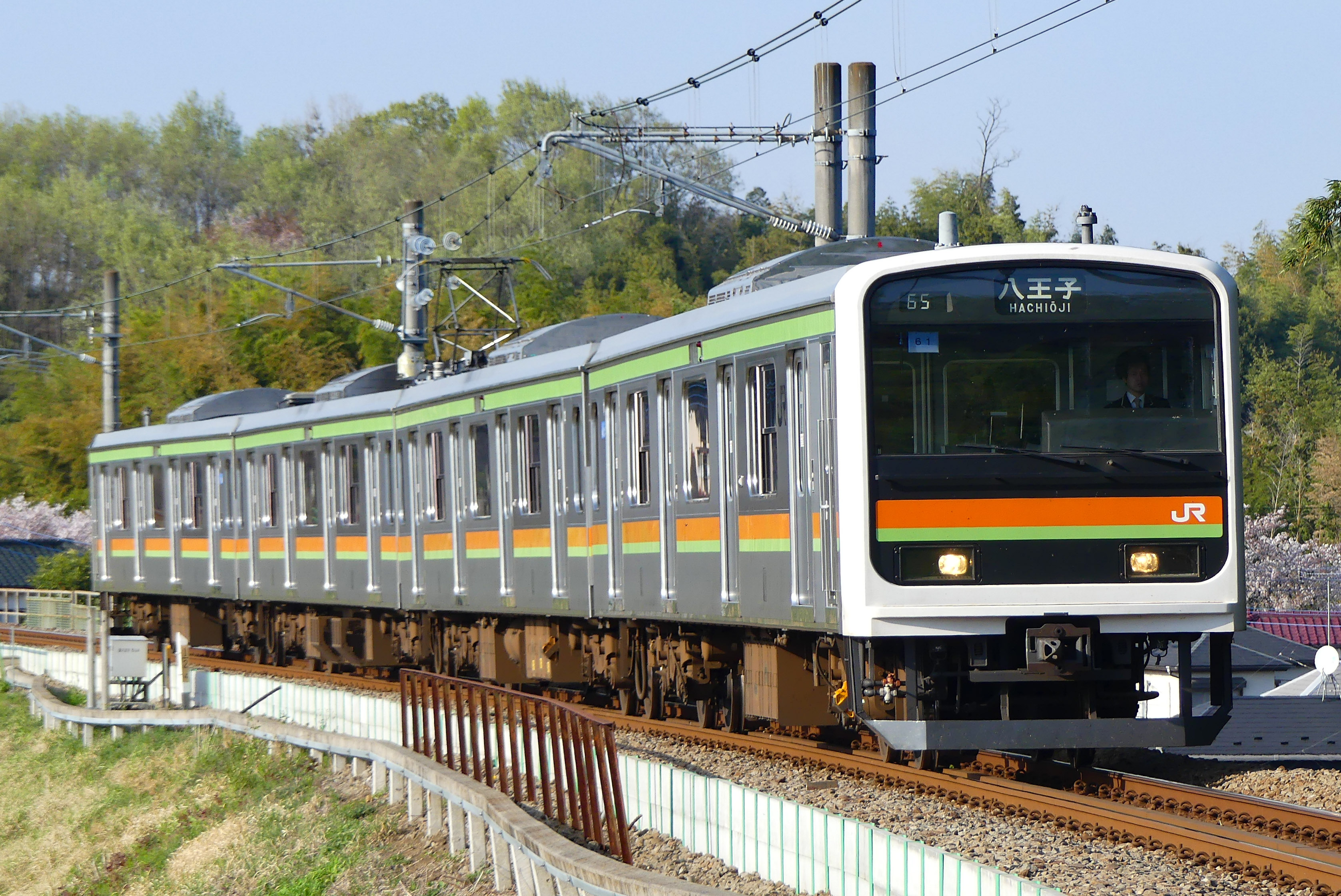
- Kawagoe/Hachikō Line 209-3000 series set 61 in April 2017
- In service: 1996–2019
- Replaced: KiHa 35
- Constructed: 1996
- Entered service: 16 March 1996
- Scrapped: 2018 (2 vehicles), 2020 (12 vehicles)
- Number built: 16 vehicles (4 sets)
- Number in service: None (2 vehicles converted to training units)
- Number scrapped: 14 vehicles
- Successor: 209-3500 series, E231-3000 series
- Formation: 4 cars per trainset
- Fleet numbers: 61–64
- Operator: JR East
- Depot: Kawagoe
- Lines served: Hachikō Line, Kawagoe Line

Specifications
- Car body construction: Stainless steel
- Width: 2,870 mm (9 ft 5 in)
- Doors: 4 pairs per side
- Electric system: 1,500 V DC overhead catenary
- Track gauge: 1,067 mm (3 ft 6 in)

Four four-car 6th-batch sets were introduced on 16 March 1996 for use on the Kawagoe Line and newly electrified southern section of the Hachikō Line. These sets (numbers 61 to 64) were based at JR East's Kawagoe depot. While visually similar to the original 209-0 sub-series, these sets differ in having passenger-operated door controls.

These sets were displaced by newly refurbished E231-3000 series and 209-3500 series sets entering service from 2017 and 2018, with the last set withdrawn in February 2019. In late 2018, two cars of set 62 were formed into a training unit and the other two cars were scrapped; the remaining three sets were scrapped in early 2020.

=== Interior ===
For a short period in 2004, KuHa 209-3003 of set 63 was fitted with transverse seating bays to increase seating capacity. It was later reverted to standard longitudinal bench seating.

Between February and March 2007, some of the previously sealed windows in each car were modified to allow them to be opened.

=== Formation (former Hachikō and Kawagoe Line sets) ===
The four four-car sets were based at Kawagoe depot in Saitama and formed as shown below with two motored ("M") cars and two non-powered trailer ("T") cars.

	← Kawagoe Hachiōji →			
Car No.	4	3	2	1
Designation	Tc	M	M'	Tc'
Numbering	KuHa 209-3000	MoHa 209-3000	MoHa 208-3000	KuHa 208-3000

- Car 3 was fitted with one PS28 lozenge-type pantograph.

=== Build details ===
Set	Manufacturer	Date delivered
61	Kawasaki Heavy Industries	January 1996
62	Tokyu Car Corporation	January 1996
63	Tokyu Car Corporation	February 1996
64	Tokyu Car Corporation	February 1996

== 209-3100 series ==
209-3100 series
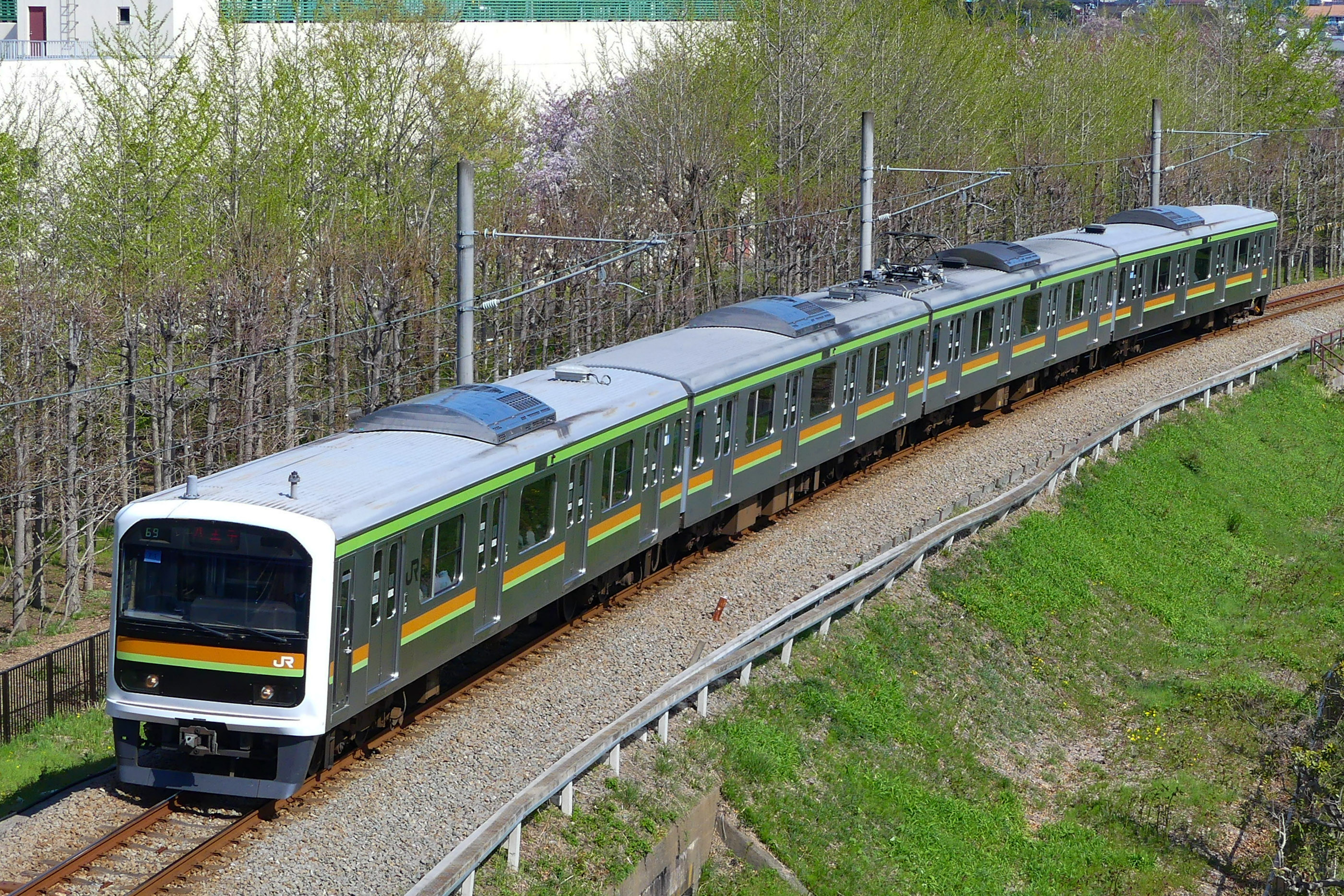
- Kawagoe/Hachikō Line 209-3100 series train at Between Haijima and Komiya station
- In service: 2005–2022
- Replaced: 103-3000 series, 103-3500 series
- Constructed: 1995, 1996, 2002 (former TWR 70-000 series cars); 2005 (new build cars)
- Entered service: 17 April 2005
- Refurbished: 2004–2005
- Number built: 8 vehicles (2 sets)
- Number in service: None
- Successor: 209-3500 series, E231-3000 series
- Formation: 4 cars per trainset
- Fleet numbers: 71–72
- Operator: JR East
- Depot: Kawagoe
- Lines served: Hachikō Line, Kawagoe Line

Specifications
- Car body construction: Stainless steel
- Width: 2,870 mm (9 ft 5 in)
- Doors: 4 pairs per side
- Traction system: GTO-VVVF (Mitsubishi)
- Electric system: 1,500 V DC overhead catenary
- Track gauge: 1,067 mm (3 ft 6 in)

This sub-series of two four-car sets was introduced on 17 April 2005 as part of the scheme to eliminate 103 series sets from the Kawagoe Line and the Hachikō Line. Set number 71 consists of two former Tokyo Waterfront Railway 70-000 series control cars with two newly manufactured intermediate cars, while set number 72 consists entirely of former 70-000 series cars. The 70-000 series cars had become surplus when six-car sets were reformed into ten-car sets in 2004. Like the 209-3000 series, these sets have passenger-operated door controls.

After being displaced by the 209-3500 and E231-3000 series sets, these sets were taken out of service in October 2019. However, they re-entered service and served as additional trains as the 209-3500 and E231-3000 series sets were modified for wanman driver-only operations. They were removed from service in January 2022 after a special retirement tour event; the sets were then officially retired on 11 March 2022.

=== Formation ===
The two four-car sets were based at Kawagoe depot in Saitama and formed as shown below with two motored ("M") cars and two non-powered trailer ("T") cars.

	← Kawagoe Hachiōji →			
Car No.	4	3	2	1
Designation	Tc	M	M'	Tc'
Numbering	KuHa 209-3100	MoHa 209-3100	MoHa 208-3100	KuHa 208-3100

- Car 3 was fitted with one PS28 lozenge-type pantograph.

=== Former TWR 70-000 series conversions ===
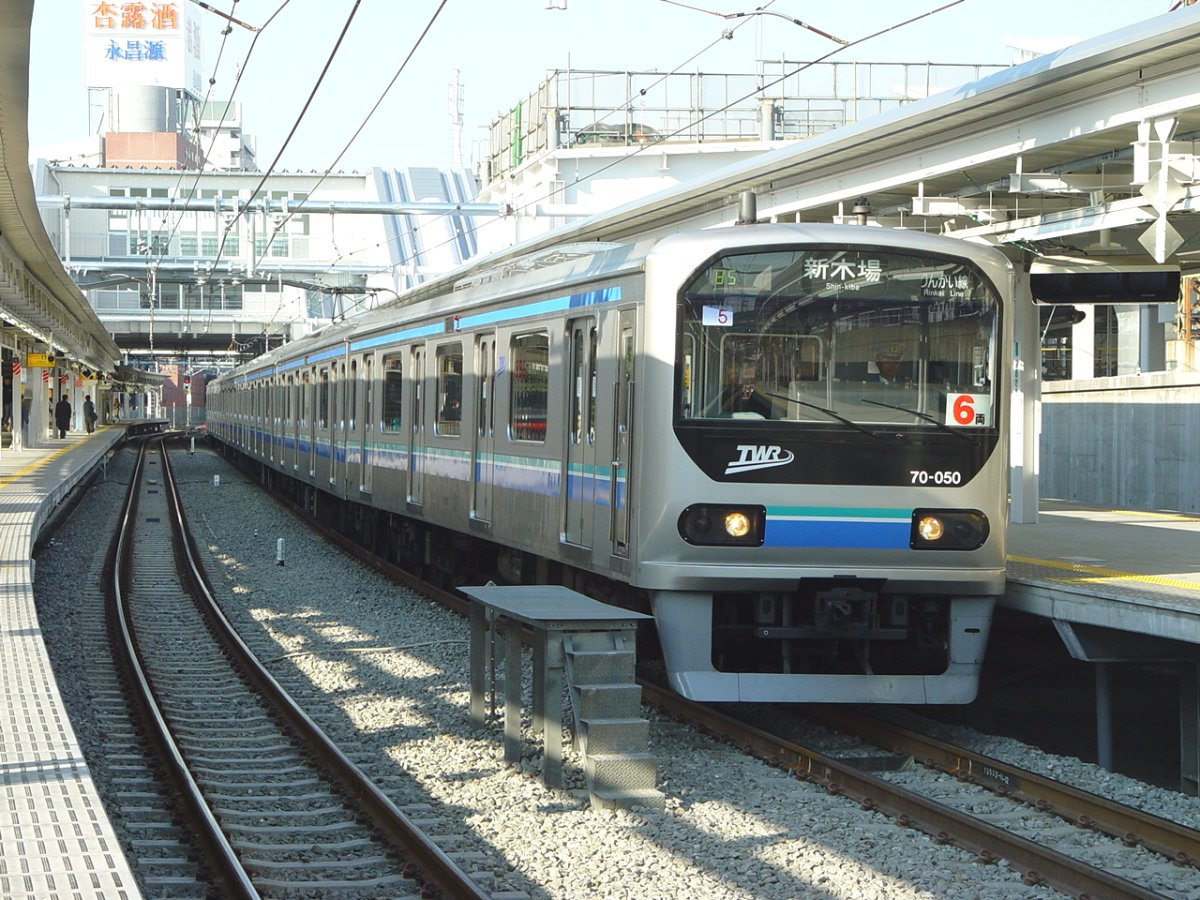
TWR 70-000 series EMU in December 2002

The identities of the six former 70-000 series cars converted in 2004 and 2005 to become 209-3100 series EMUs are as shown below.

Car number	Set number	Former car number	Date returned to traffic
KuHa 209-3101	71	70-020	14 March 2005
KuHa 208-3101	71	70-029	14 March 2005
KuHa 209-3102	72	70-030	16 December 2004
MoHa 209-3102	72	70-027	16 December 2004
MoHa 208-3102	72	70-028	16 December 2004
KuHa 209-3102	72	70-039	16 December 2004

== 209-3500 series ==
209-3500 series
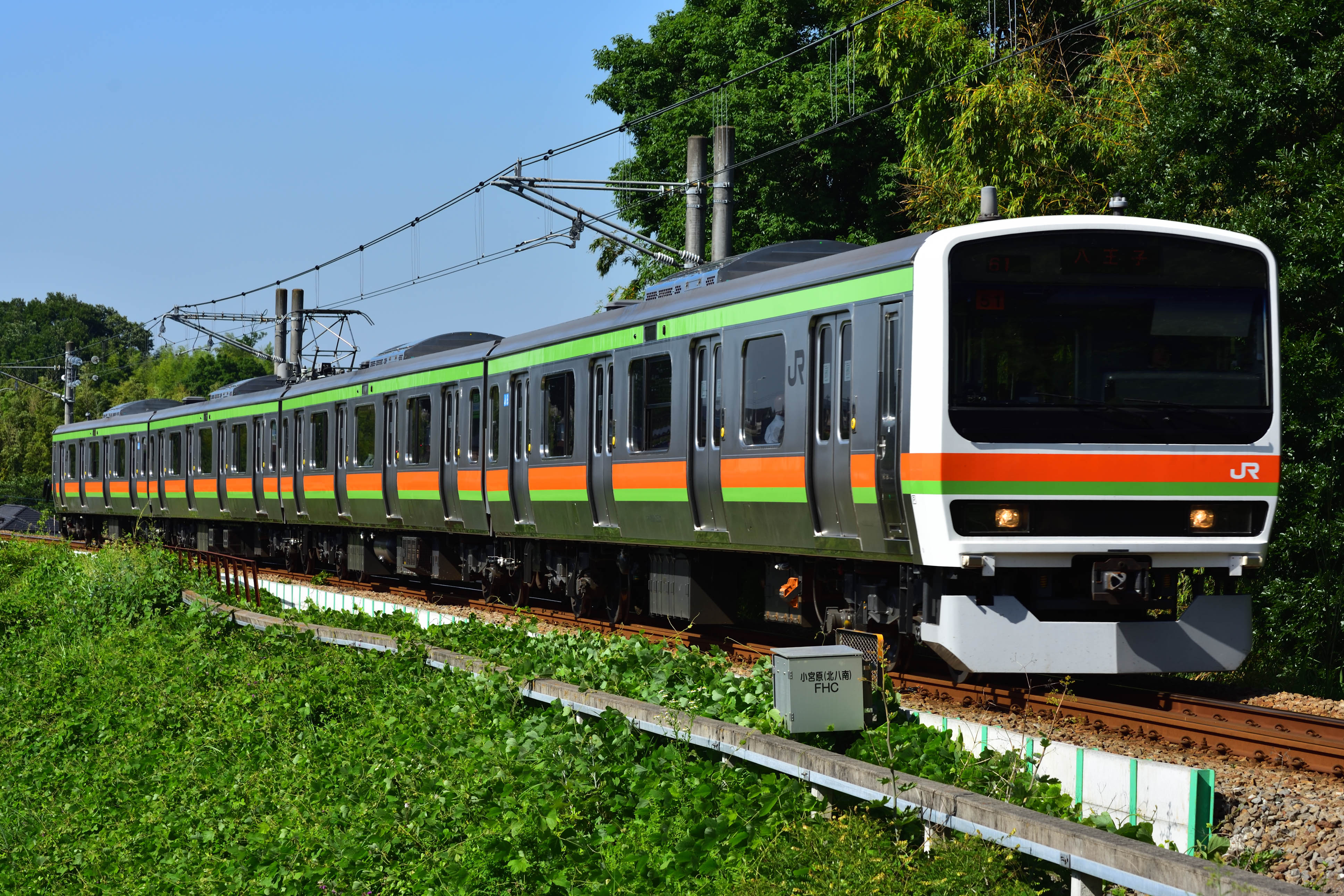
- Kawagoe/Hachikō Line 209-3500 series set, June 2018
- In service: 2018–present
- Replaced: 205-3000 series, 209-3000 series, 209-3100 series
- Constructed: 1998–1999
- Entered service: 2018
- Refurbished: 2017–2018 (converted from 209-500 series); 2020–2021 (modified for driver-only operation)
- Number built: 20 vehicles (5 sets)
- Number in service: 20 vehicles (5 sets)
- Formation: 4 cars per trainset
- Fleet numbers: 51–55
- Operator: JR East
- Depot: Kawagoe
- Lines served: Hachikō Line, Kawagoe Line

Specifications
- Car body construction: Stainless steel
- Width: 2,950 mm (9 ft 8 in)
- Doors: 4 pairs per side
- Electric system: 1,500 V DC overhead catenary
- Track gauge: 1,067 mm (3 ft 6 in)

From 2018, five former 209-500 series ten-car sets based at Mitaka Depot for use on Chūō–Sōbu Line services were reformed and converted to become four-car 209-3500 series sets based at Kawagoe for use on Kawagoe Line and Hachikō Line services.

Between November 2020 and October 2021, the trains were modified for driver-only operation (wanman (ワンマン; "one man")).

=== Formation ===
	← Kawagoe Hachiōji →			
Car No.	4	3	2	1
Designation	Tc	M	M'	Tc'
Numbering	KuHa 209-3500	MoHa 209-3500	MoHa 208-3500	KuHa 208-3500

=== Former set/car identities ===
The former identities of the 209-3500 series sets are as follows.

Set No.	Car numbers				Former set No.	Former car numbers			
51	KuHa 209-3501	MoHa 209-3501	MoHa 208-3501	KuHa 208-3501	C501	KuHa 209-501	MoHa 209-502	MoHa 208-502	KuHa 208-501
52	KuHa 209-3502	MoHa 209-3502	MoHa 208-3502	KuHa 208-3502	C502	KuHa 209-502	MoHa 209-504	MoHa 208-504	KuHa 208-502
53	KuHa 209-3503	MoHa 209-3503	MoHa 208-3503	KuHa 208-3503	C503	KuHa 209-503	MoHa 209-506	MoHa 208-506	KuHa 208-503
54	KuHa 209-3504	MoHa 209-3504	MoHa 208-3504	KuHa 208-3504	C504	KuHa 209-504	MoHa 209-508	MoHa 208-508	KuHa 208-504
55	KuHa 209-3505	MoHa 209-3505	MoHa 208-3505	KuHa 208-3505	C505	KuHa 209-505	MoHa 209-510	MoHa 208-510	KuHa 208-505

== Training sets ==
Training sets
- In service: 2008–present
- Constructed: 1993, 1995–1996
- Entered service: 2008
- Refurbished: 2008, 2018–2019
- Number built: 8 vehicles (converted from 209-0 series and 209-3000 series)
- Number in service: 8 vehicles (4 sets)
- Formation: 2 cars per trainset
- Operator: JR East

Specifications
- Car body construction: Stainless steel
- Width: 2,950 mm (9 ft 8 in)
- Doors: 4 pairs per side
- Electric system: 1,500 V DC overhead catenary
- Track gauge: 1,067 mm (3 ft 6 in)

In 2008, three motored pairs from former Keihin–Tōhoku—Negishi Line 209-0 series sets (MoHa 209-39/208-39 and MoHa 209-40/208-40 from set Ura 19, and MoHa 209-76/208-76 from set Ura 37) were fitted with driving cabs and converted into training sets. These sets were assigned to Yokohama, Hachiōji, and Ōmiya Training Centers. In 2018, one motored pair from a former Kawagoe/Hachikō Line 209-3000 series set (MoHa 209-3002/208-3002 from set Hae 62) was also fitted with driving cabs and converted into a training set. The existing three training sets were subsequently refurbished and reallocated.

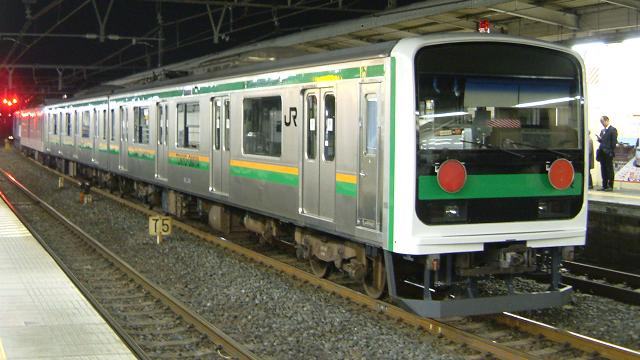
Ōmiya area 2-car training set in March 2008

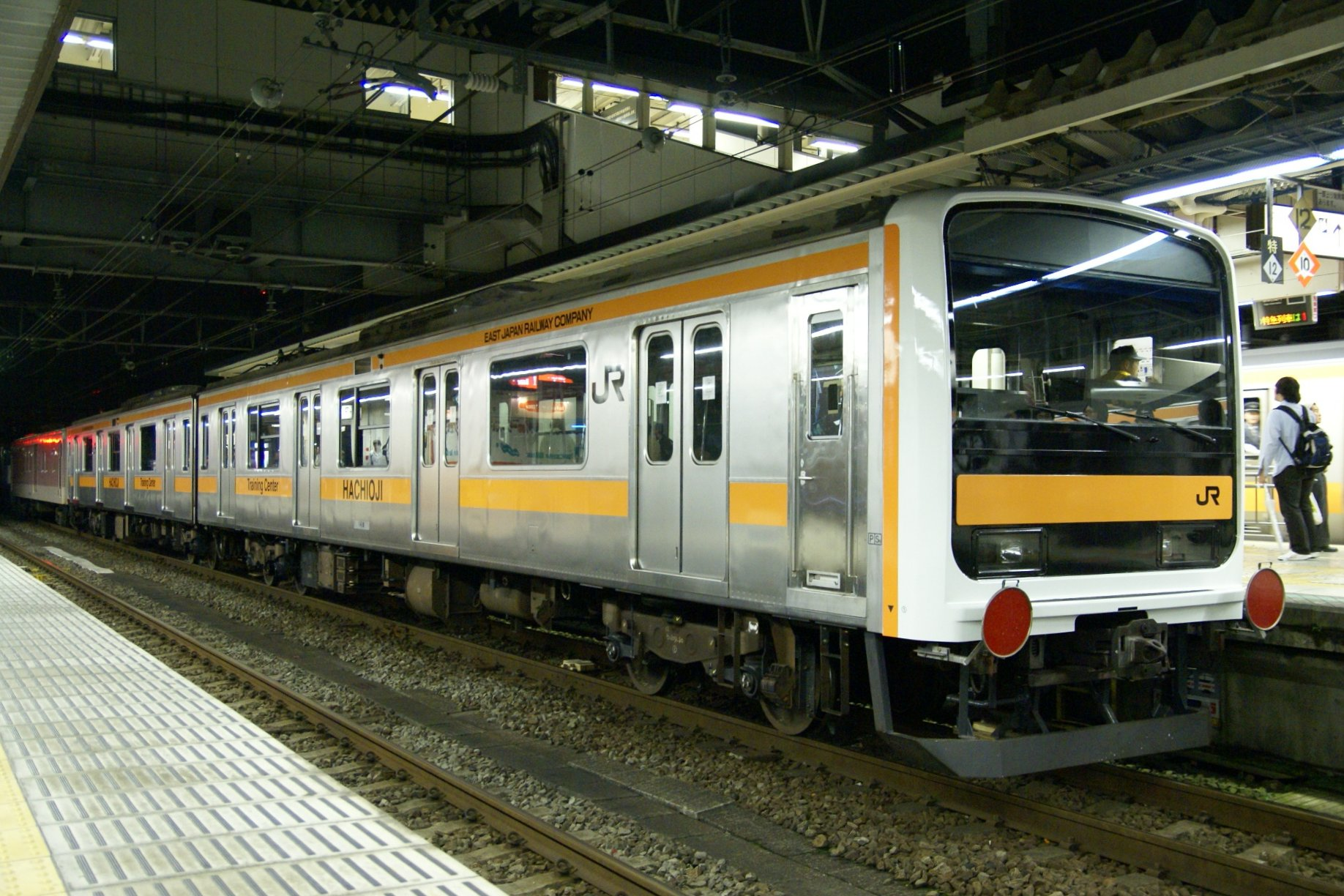
Hachiōji area 2-car training set in October 2008

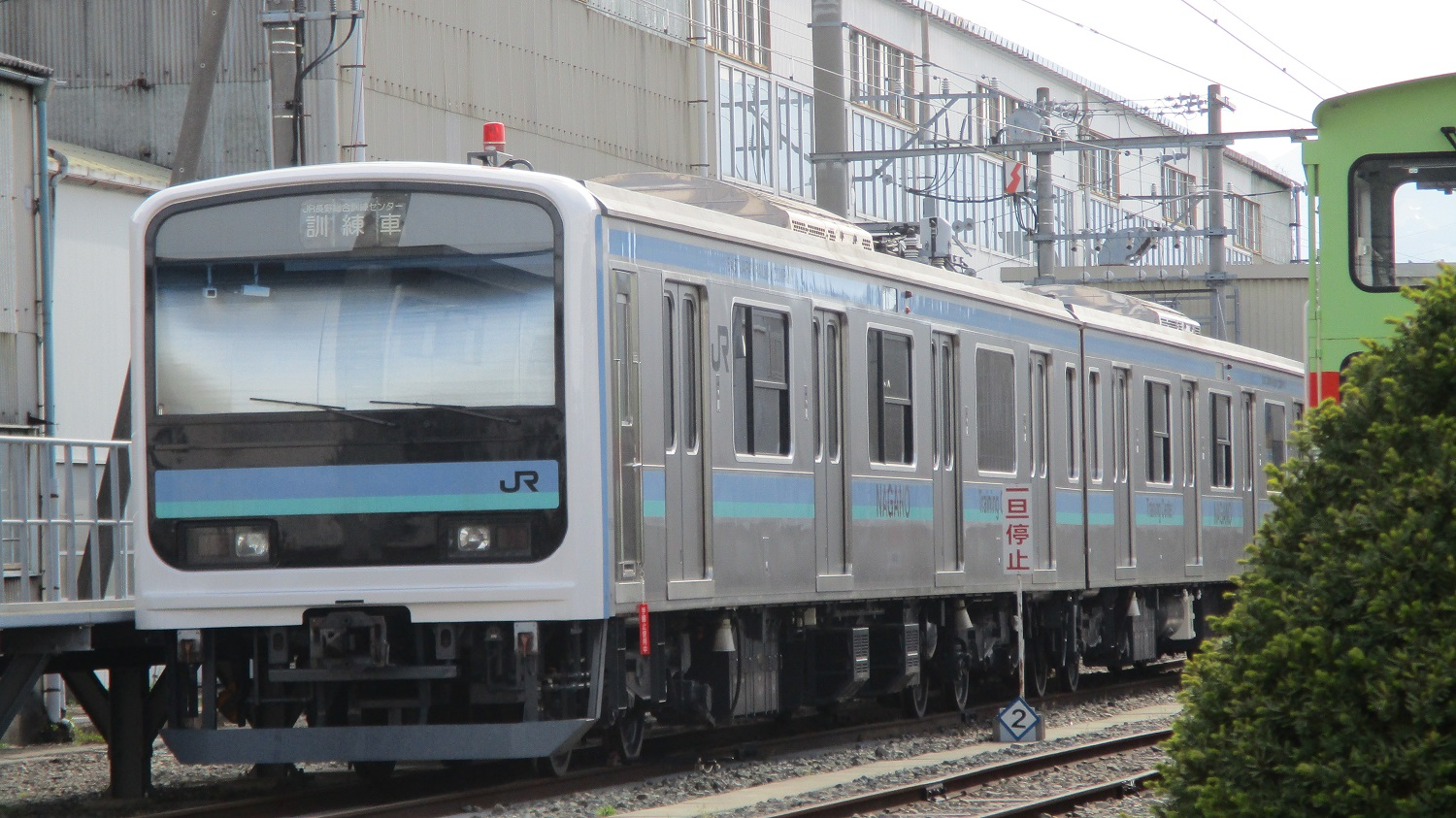
Nagano area 2-car training set in April 2021

=== Yokohama ===
From 2008, a training set consisting of KuMoHa 209-39/208-39 is allocated to Yokohama Training Center near Kurihama Station. The set is finished with pale yellow body stripes and bears the text "YOKOHAMA Training Center". It replaced the existing 105 series two-car training set located there.

=== Ōmiya ===
From 2018, a training set consisting of KuMoHa 209-3002/208-3002 is allocated to Ōmiya Training Center. The set is finished with Shōnan green/orange body stripes and bears the text "TOKYO•OMIYA Training Center".

Between 2008 and 2018, set KuMoHa 209-76/208-76 was allocated to Ōmiya. This replaced the existing 103 series two-car training set located there.

=== Hachiōji ===
From 2019, a training set consisting of KuMoHa 209-76/208-76 is allocated to Hachiōji Training Center near Shin-Akitsu Station. The set is finished with orange body stripes and bears the text "HACHIOJI Training Center".

Between 2008 and 2019, set KuMoHa 209-40/208-40 was allocated to Hachiōji. This replaced the existing 105 series two-car training set located there.

=== Nagano ===
From 2019, a training set consisting of KuMoHa 209-40/208-40 is allocated to Nagano Training Center. The set is finished in with Nagano blue body stripes and bears the text "NAGANO Training Center". It replaced the existing 115 series two-car training set located there.

=== Shirakawa E991 series ===
A purpose-built four-car set based directly on the 209-0 series design and classified E991 series was delivered to JR East's training center in Shirakawa, Fukushima in 2000 for internal training use. Externally, it is finished with green body stripes on unpainted stainless steel. It is not considered a 209 series variant. It cannot run on its own power and must be towed by a locomotive.

== MUE-Train ==
MUE-Train
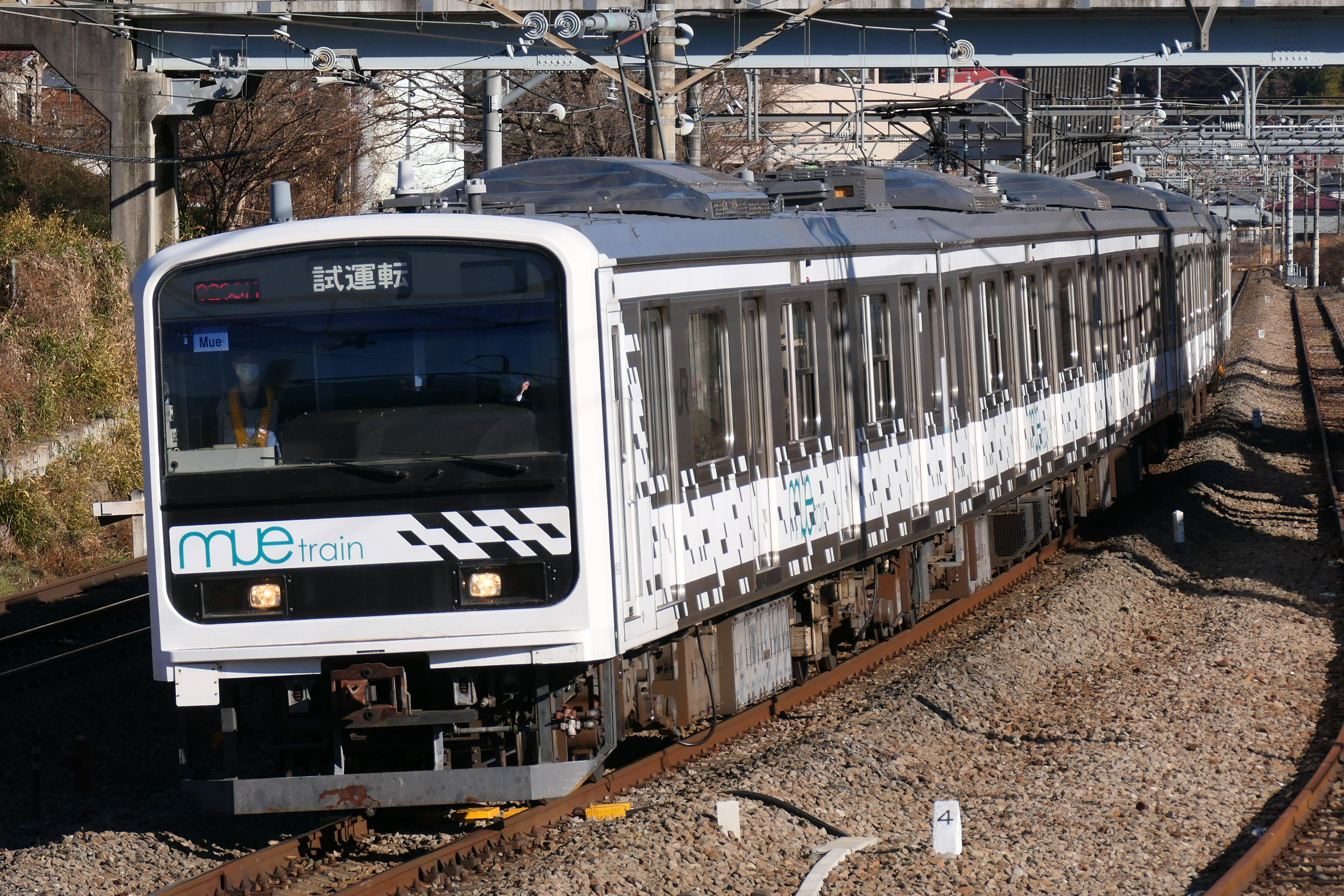
- MUE-Train undergoing testing in December 2020
- In service: 2008–present
- Constructed: 1992
- Entered service: November 2008
- Refurbished: 2008 (converted from 209-0 series)
- Number built: 7 vehicles
- Number in service: 6 vehicles (1 set)
- Number scrapped: 1 vehicle
- Formation: 6 cars per trainset
- Operator: JR East
- Depot: Kawagoe

Specifications
- Car body construction: Stainless steel
- Width: 2,950 mm (9 ft 8 in)
- Doors: 4 pairs per side
- Electric system: 1,500 V DC overhead catenary
- Track gauge: 1,067 mm (3 ft 6 in)

In October 2008, JR East unveiled the seven-car "MUE-Train" (MUltipurpose Experimental Train) experimental EMU converted from former Keihin–Tōhoku—Negishi Line 209 series set Ura 2. This set is used to test and develop new technology for use on future narrow-gauge trains. The train is based at Kawagoe Depot and began testing on the Utsunomiya Line from November 2008.

=== Formation ===
==== 2008–2009 ====
Car No.	1	2	3	4	5	6	7
Numbering	KuYa 208-2	MoYa 208-4	MoYa 209-4	SaYa 209-8	MoYa 208-3	MoYa 209-3	KuYa 209-2

==== 2010 onward ====
Car No.	1	2	3	5	6	7
Numbering	KuYa 208-2	MoYa 208-4	MoYa 209-4	MoYa 208-3	MoYa 209-3	KuYa 209-2

Cars 3 and 6 are each fitted with one PS33D single-arm pantograph.

== Accidents ==
On 8 May 2020, at 3:55 pm, the front carriage of a local service (6-car set C612) derailed between Awa-Kamogawa and Awa-Amatsu stations. Among the 21 passengers and crew on board the train when it derailed, nobody was injured.

== Preserved examples ==
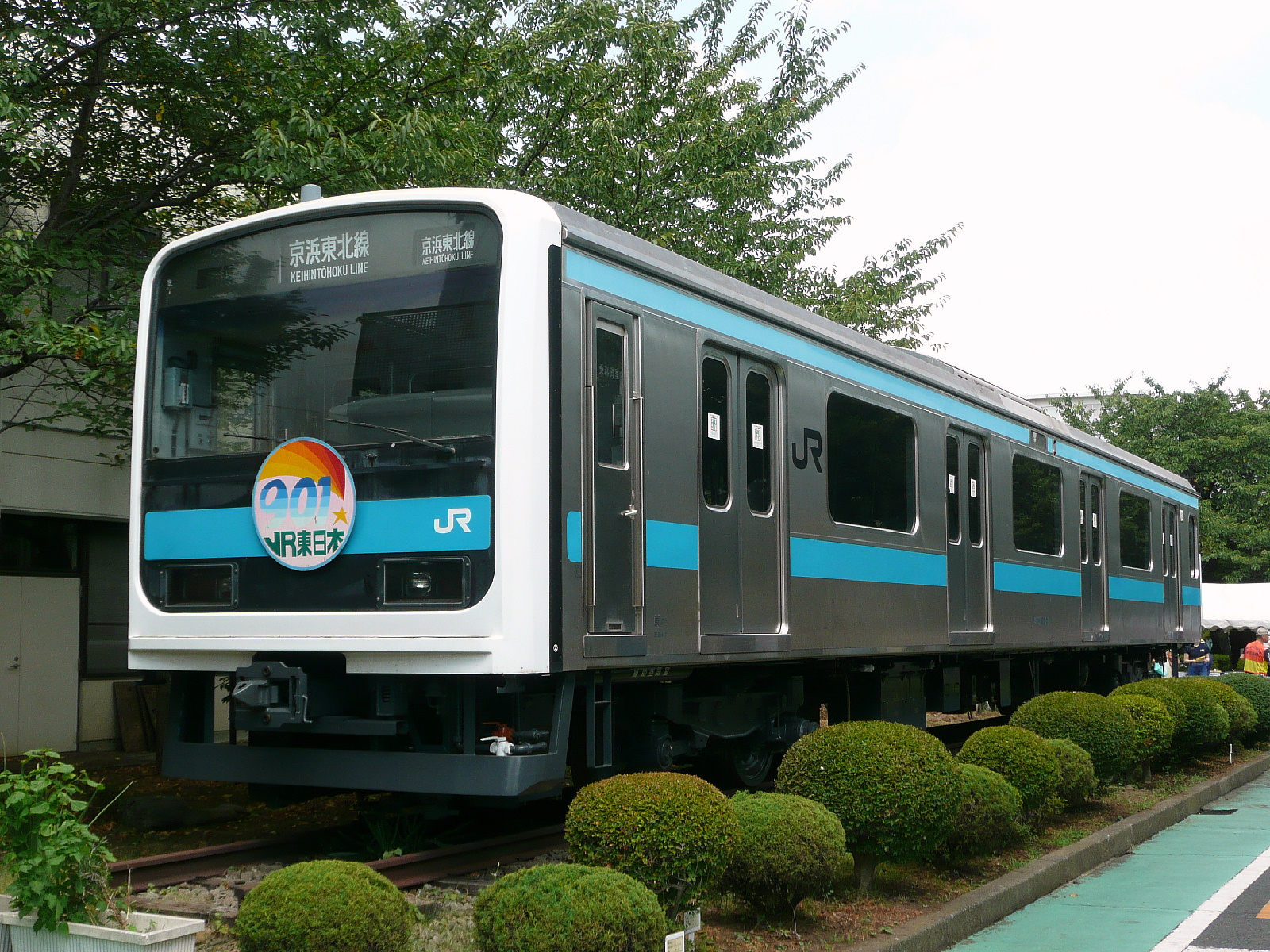
KuHa 901-1 preserved at Tokyo General Rolling Stock Center in August 2010

- KuHa 901-1 (previously KuHa 209-901), at the Tokyo General Rolling Stock Center in Shinagawa.

== See also ==
- E231 series, successor
- TWR 70-000 series, a 209 series derivative
