= 201 series =

Japanese train type

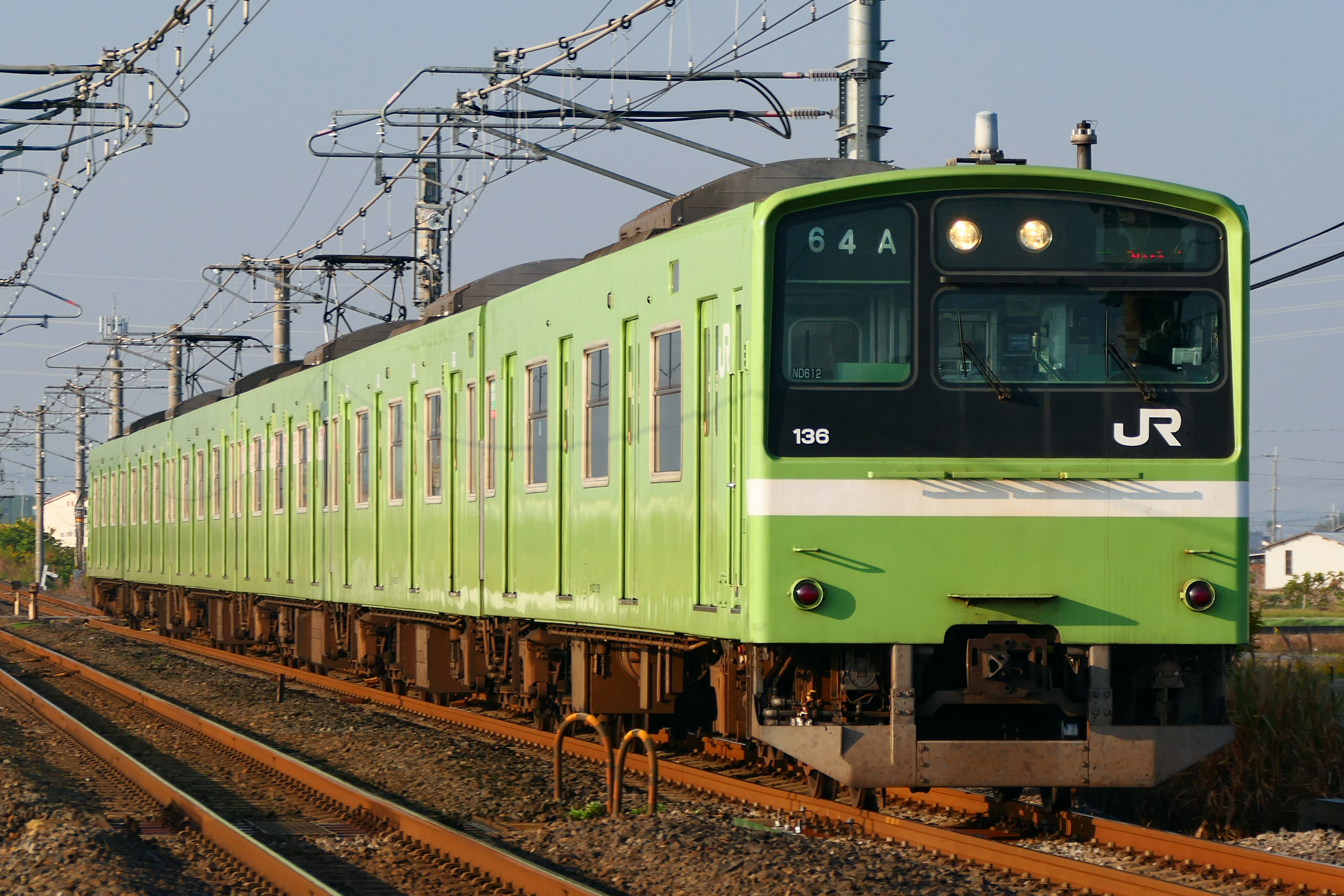
- A 201 series train in November 2023
- In service: 20 August 1979 –14 March 2025
- Manufacturers: Hitachi, Kawasaki Heavy Industries, Kinki Sharyo, Nippon Sharyo, Tokyu Car Corporation
- Replaced: 101 series 103 series
- Constructed: 1979 (201-900 series prototype); 1981–1985
- Entered service: 20 August 1979
- Refurbished: 2003–2007 (JR-West)
- Number built: 1,018 vehicles
- Number in service: None
- Number preserved: 1 vehicle
- Number scrapped: 885 vehicles
- Successor: E231 series, E233 series, 321 series, 323 series
- Operators: JNR (1979–1987); JR East (1987–2011); JR-West (1987–2025)
- Depots: Morinomiya; Nara
- Lines served: Yamatoji Line, Sakurai Line, Wakayama Line, Osaka Higashi Line

Specifications
- Car body construction: Steel
- Car length: 20 m (65 ft 7 in)
- Maximum speed: 100 km/h (62 mph) (service); 110 km/h (68 mph) (design speed)
- Traction system: Thyristor chopper
- Traction motors: MT60 (150kW)
- Acceleration: 2.5 km/(h⋅s) (1.6 mph/s)
- Deceleration: 3.5 km/(h⋅s) (2.2 mph/s)
- Electric systems: 1,500 V DC overhead catenary
- Current collection: PS21 diamond-shaped pantograph
- Braking systems: Regenerative brake, electro-pneumatic brake
- Safety systems: ATS-S, ATS-SN, ATS-SW, ATS-B, ATS-P
- Track gauge: 1,067 mm (3 ft 6 in)

The 201 series (201系, 201-kei) was a DC electric multiple unit (EMU) commuter train type introduced in 1979 by Japanese National Railways (JNR). It was operated by West Japan Railway Company (JR-West) from 1987 until 2025 and East Japan Railway Company (JR East) from 1987 until 20 June 2011.

It was the first JNR train to use electronic chopper control.

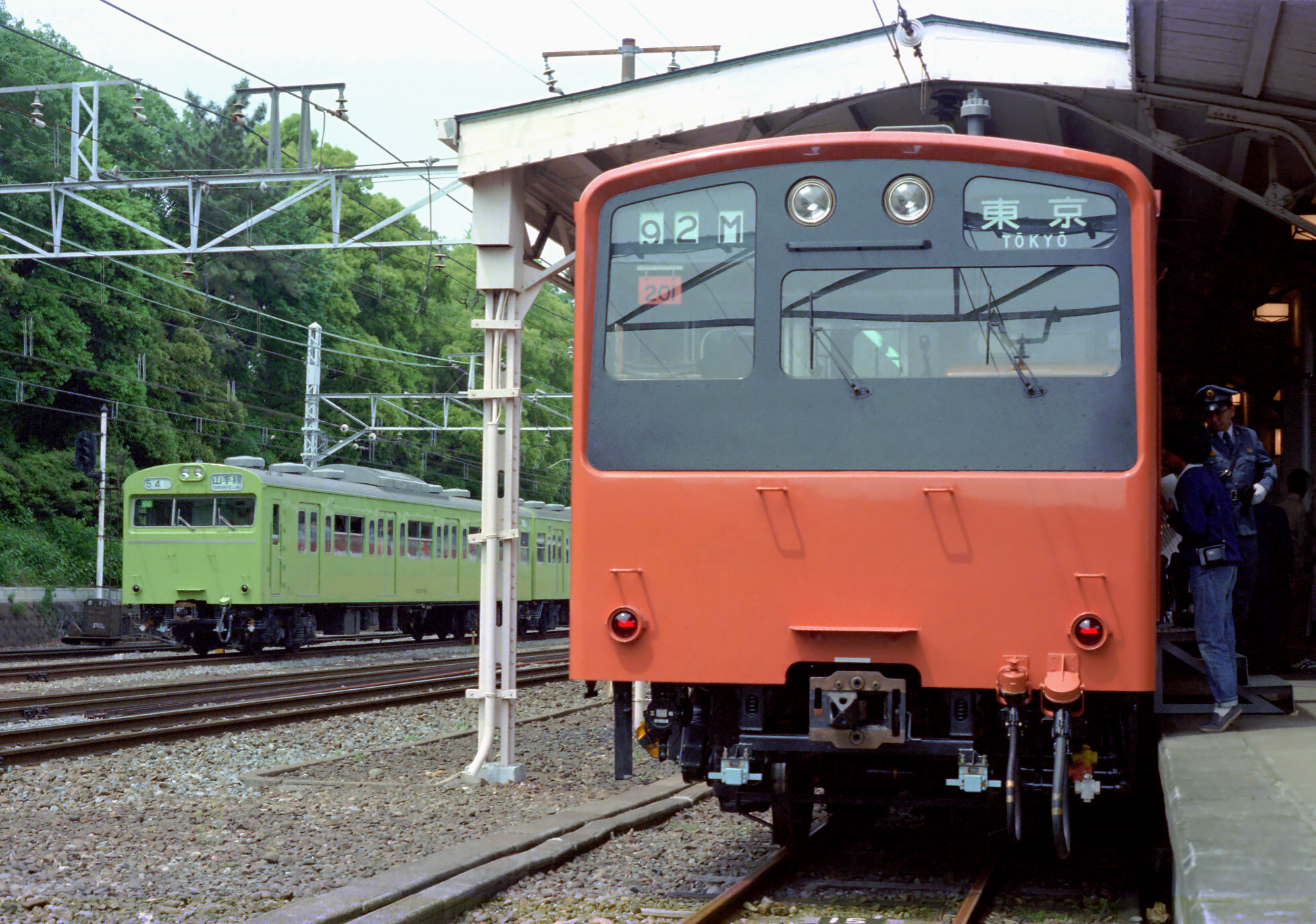
The prototype unit on public display at Harajuku Station in Tokyo, 13 May 1979. Next to it, a 103 series train can be seen passing through.

== Operations ==
The 201 series stock was used on a large number of lines.

=== JR-West ===
- Kansai Main Line (Yamatoji Line), Sakurai Line (Manyo Mahoroba Line), Wakayama Line (from 2006 to 14 March 2025)
- Tokaido Main Line, Sanyo Main Line (Biwako Line, JR Kyoto Line, JR Kobe Line) (Kusatsu – Kakogawa) (from 1983 to 2007)
- Kosei Line (from 1997 to 2007, 2018 [test runs])
- Fukuchiyama Line (JR Takarazuka Line) (from 1997 to 2007)
- Osaka Loop Line (from 2005 to 7 June 2019)
- Sakurajima Line (JR Yumesaki Line) (from 2005 to 2019)
- Osaka Higashi Line (from 2008 to 11 March 2022)
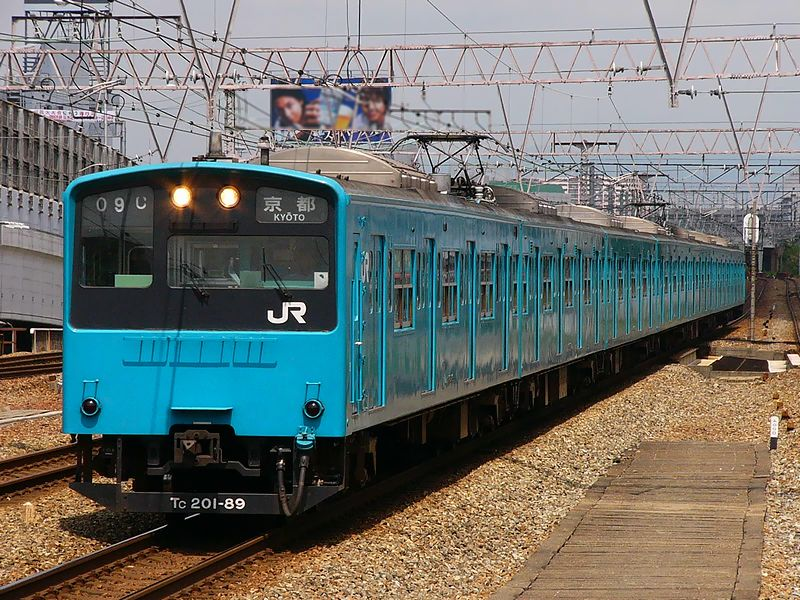
201 series on a JR Kyoto Line service in August 2004

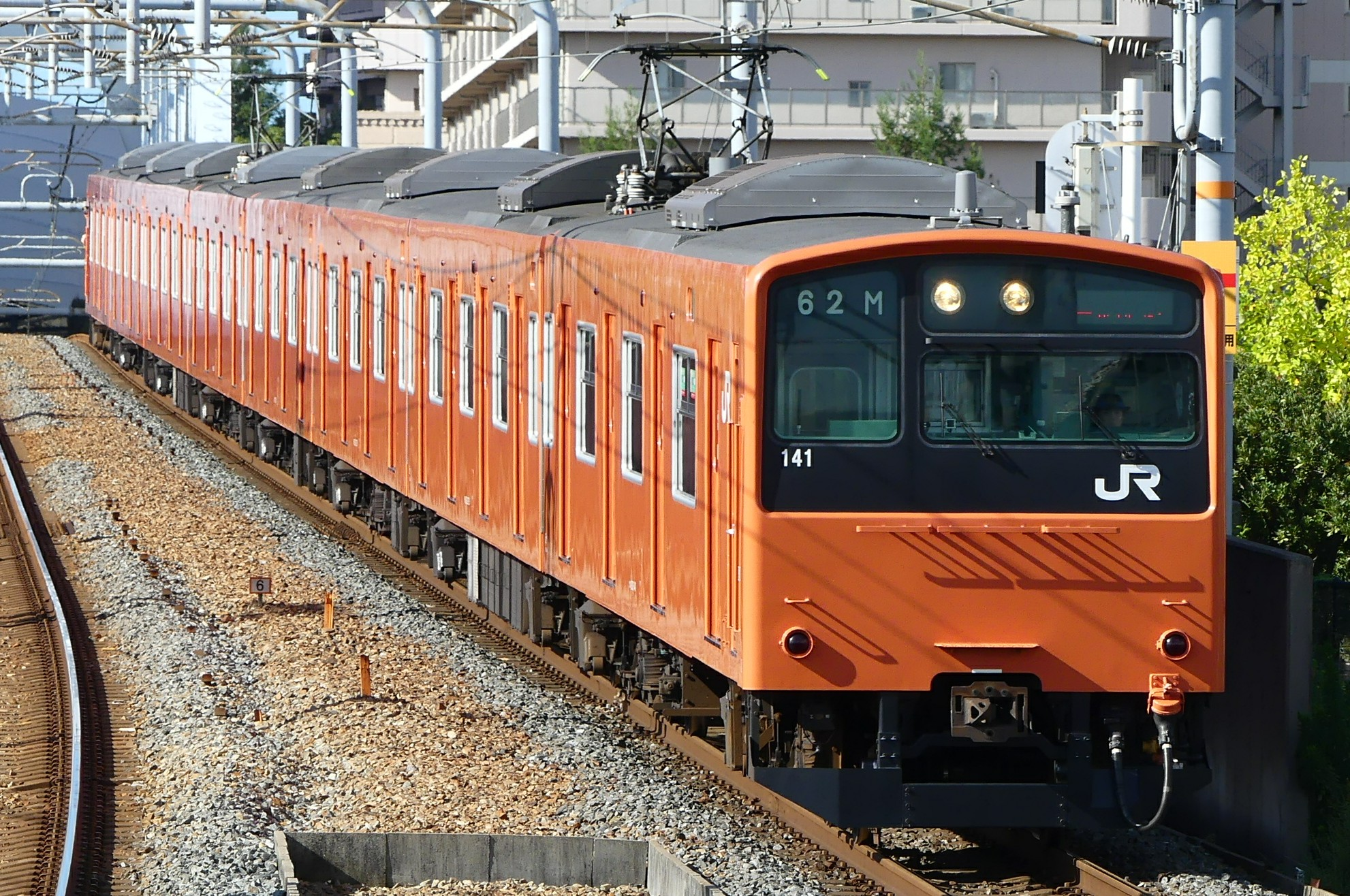
Osaka Loop Line 201 series refurbished train in September 2017

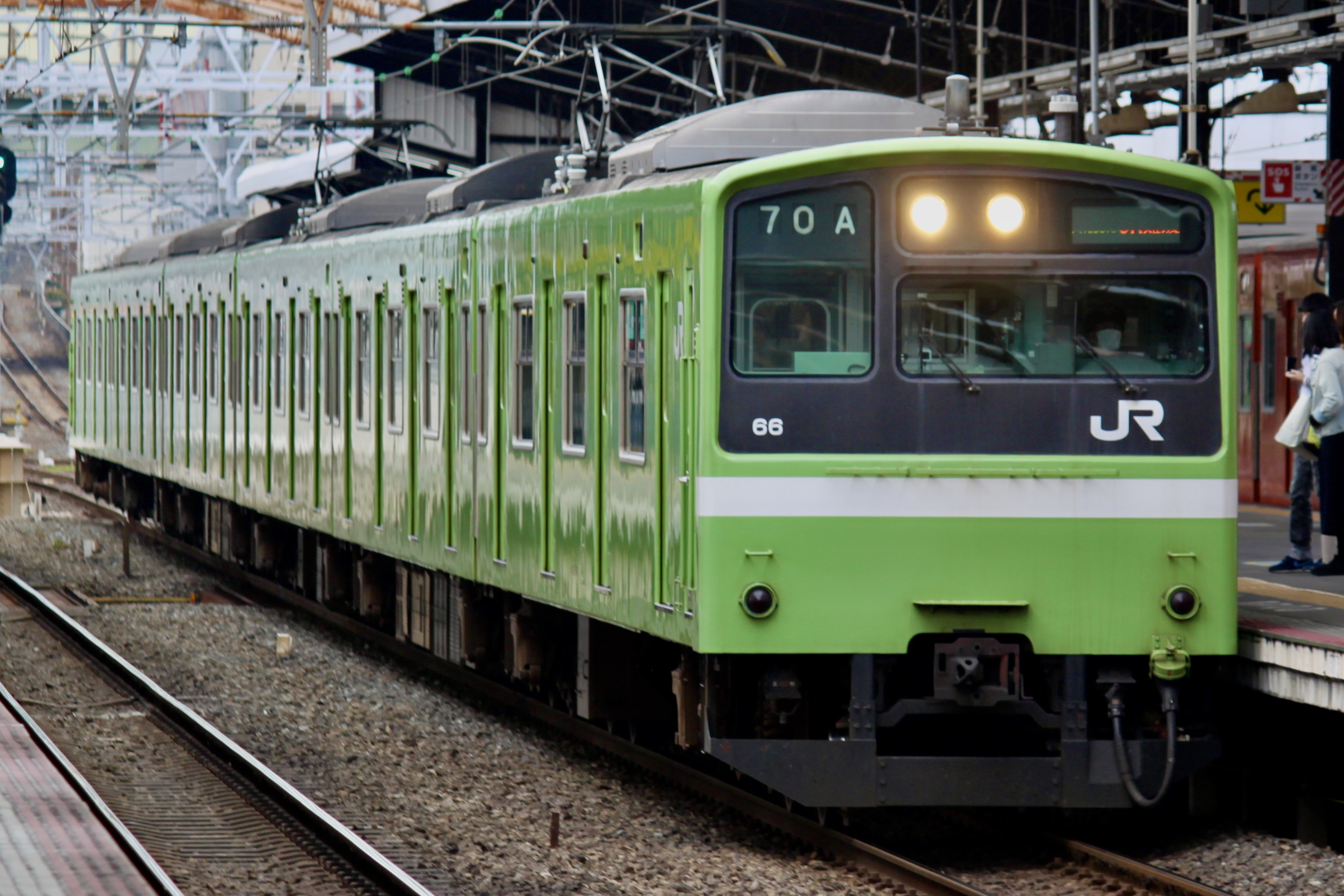
Yamatoji Line 201 series refurbished train in March 2016

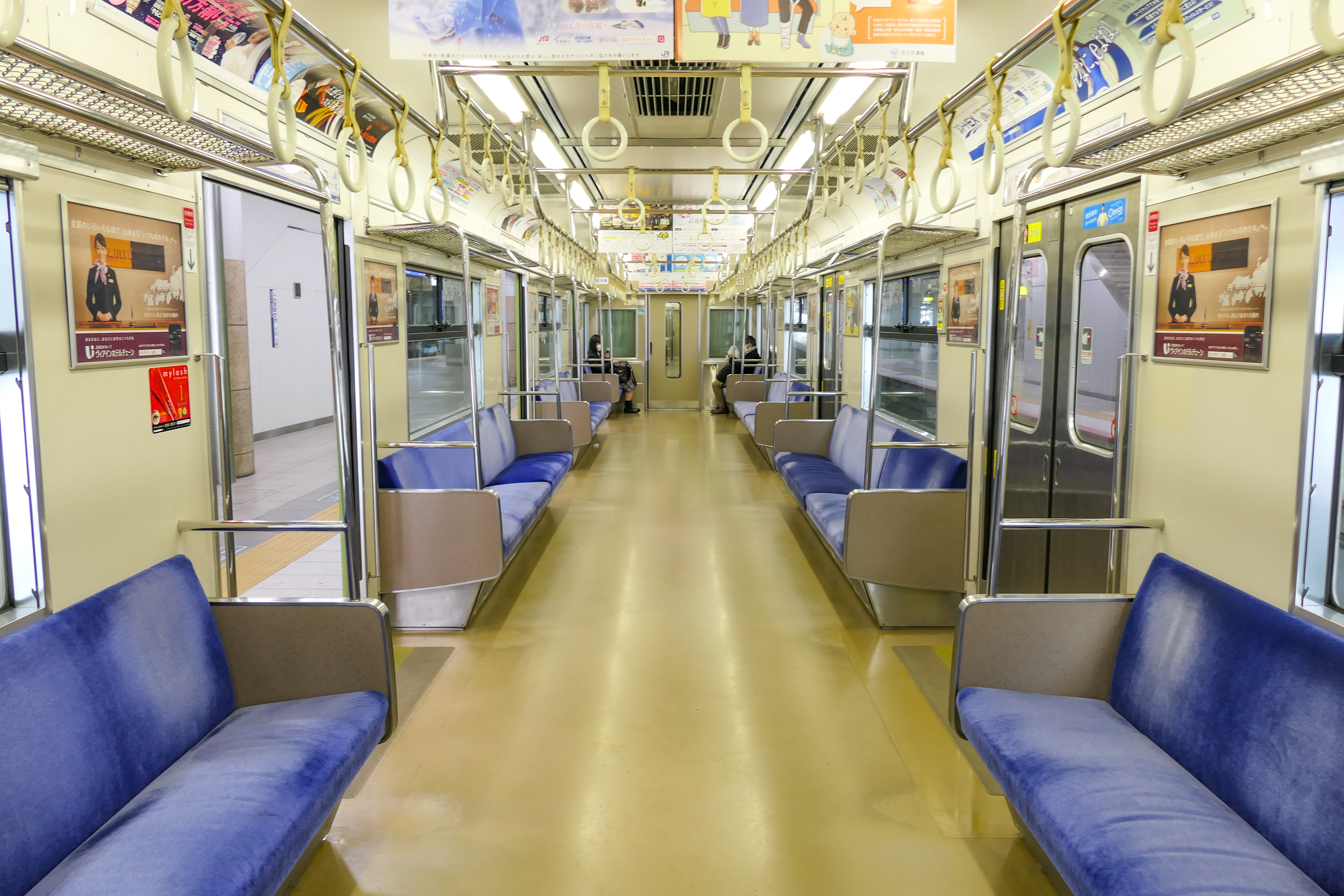
Refurbished interior in December 2021

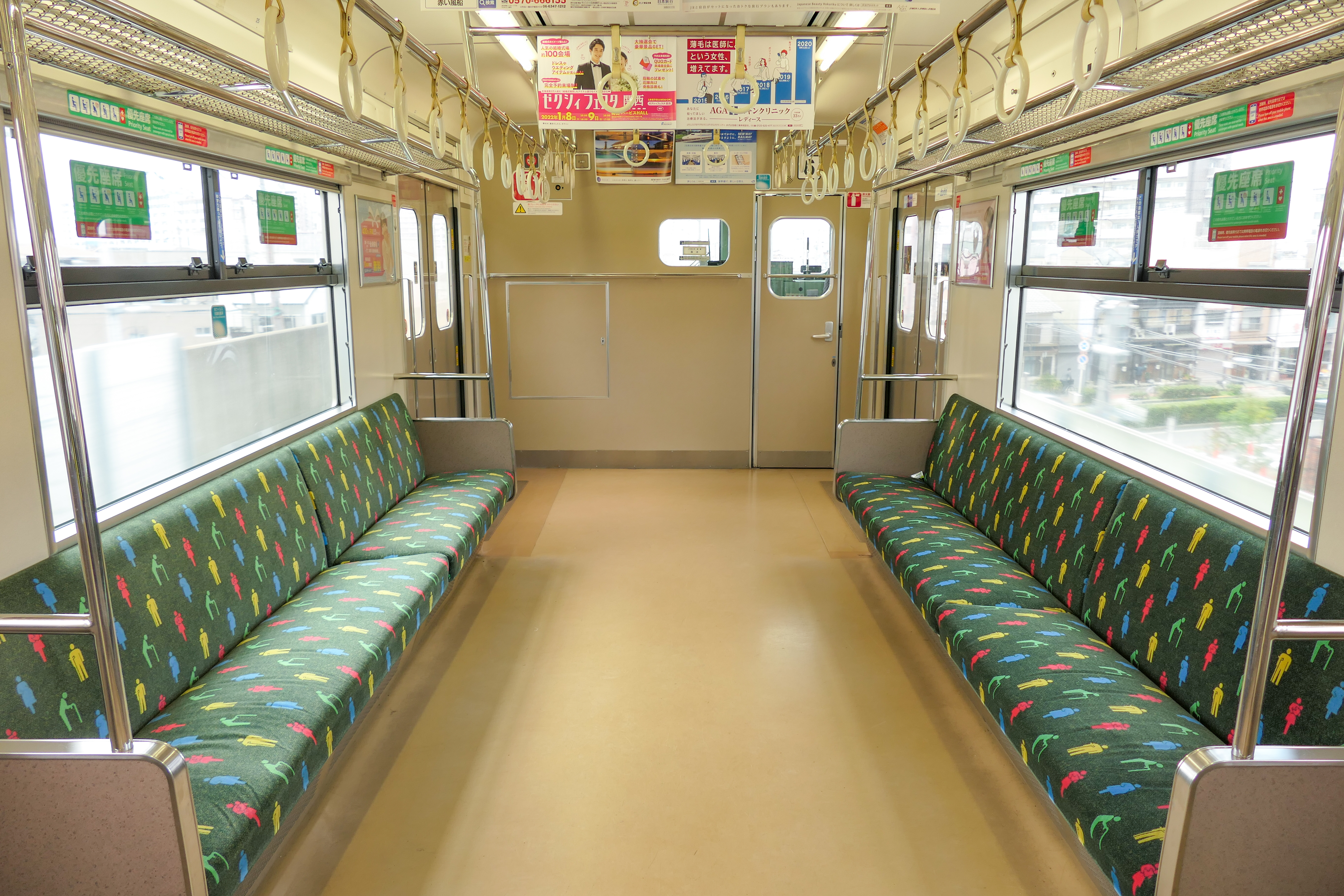
Refurbished priority seats view in December 2021

=== JR East ===
- Chūō Rapid Line (10 cars) (from 1979 to October 2010)
- Chūō-Sōbu Line (10 cars) (from 1982 to 2001)
- Ōme Line (4 cars) (from 1999 to 2008)
- Itsukaichi Line (6 cars) (from 1999 to 2008)
- Hachikō Line (6+4 cars) (Hachiōji – Komagawa, until March 2008)
- Keiyō Line, Sotobō Line, Tōgane Line (10 cars) (from 2000 to 20 June 2011)
- Musashino Line (6 cars) (from 3 March 1986 to November 1996)
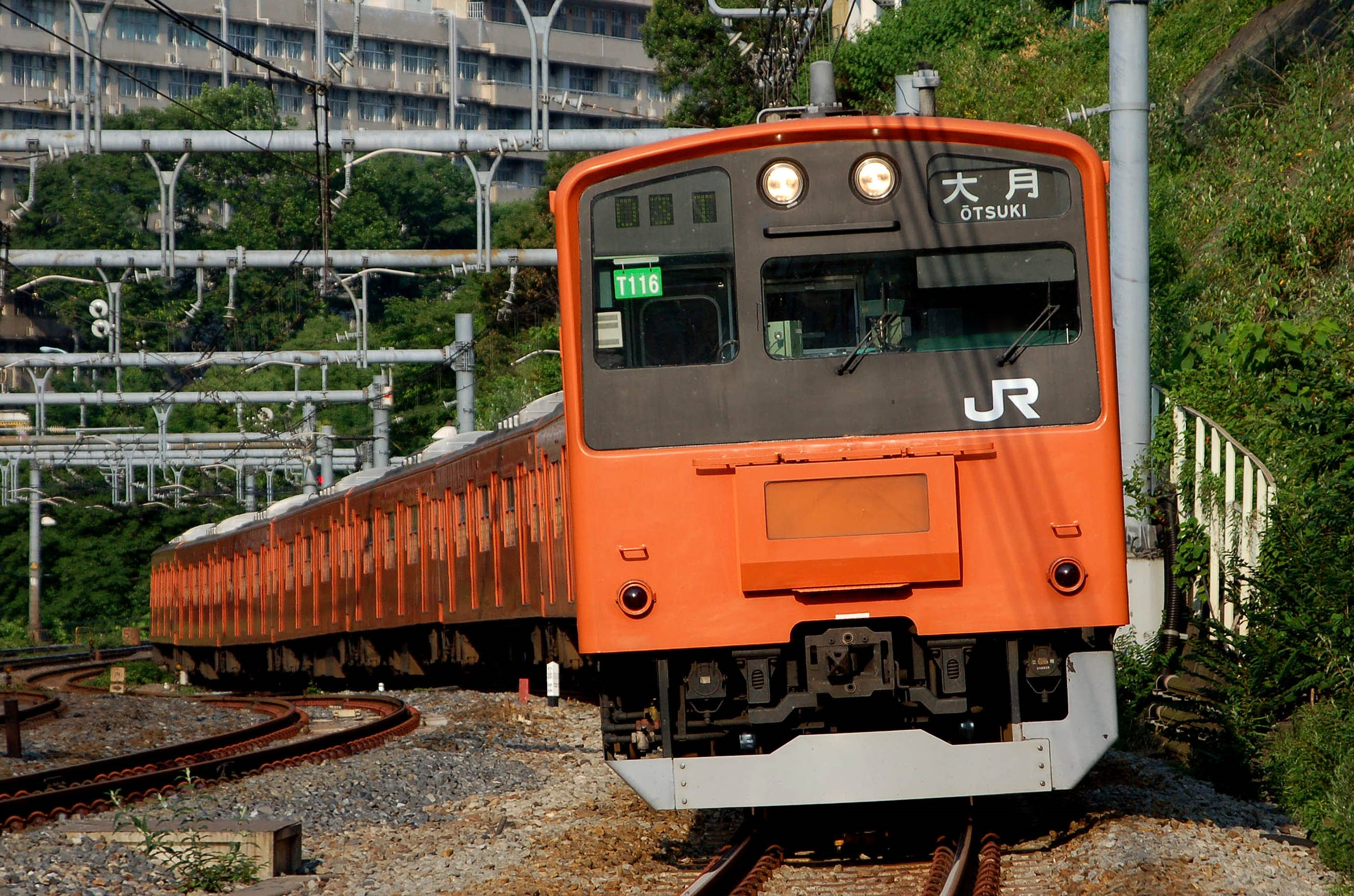
A Chuo/Ōme Line 201 series in June 2006

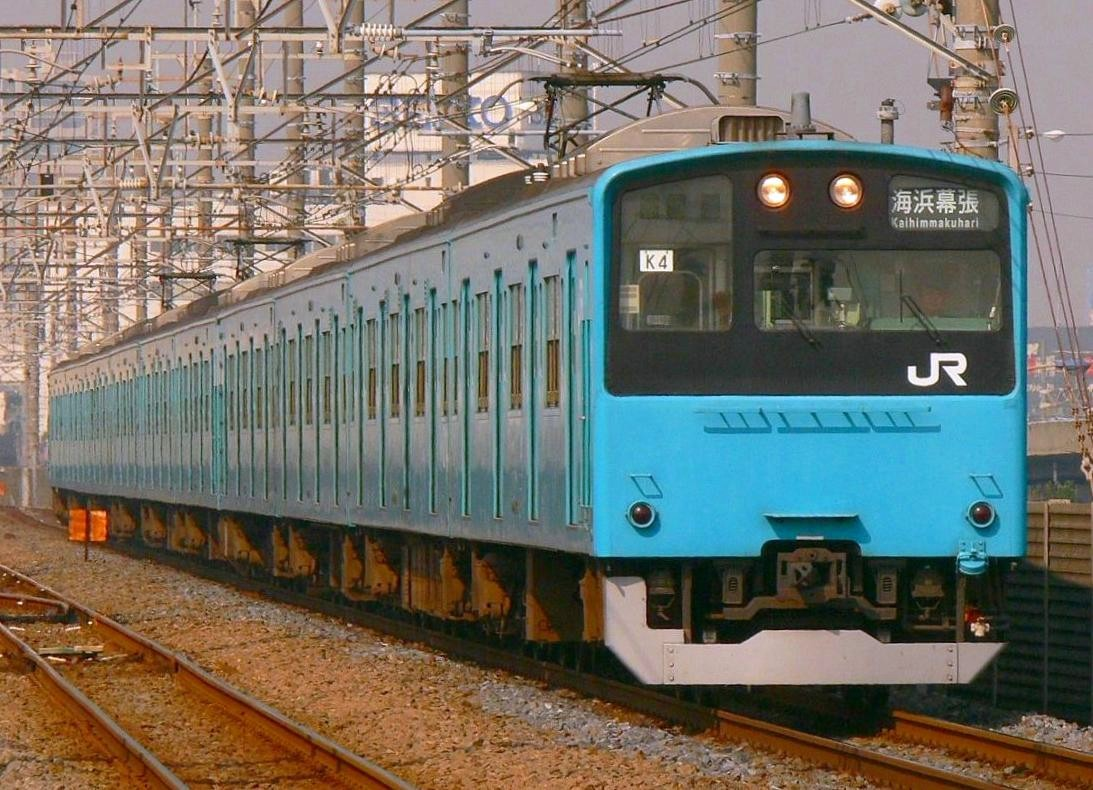
A Keiyo Line 201 series in February 2007

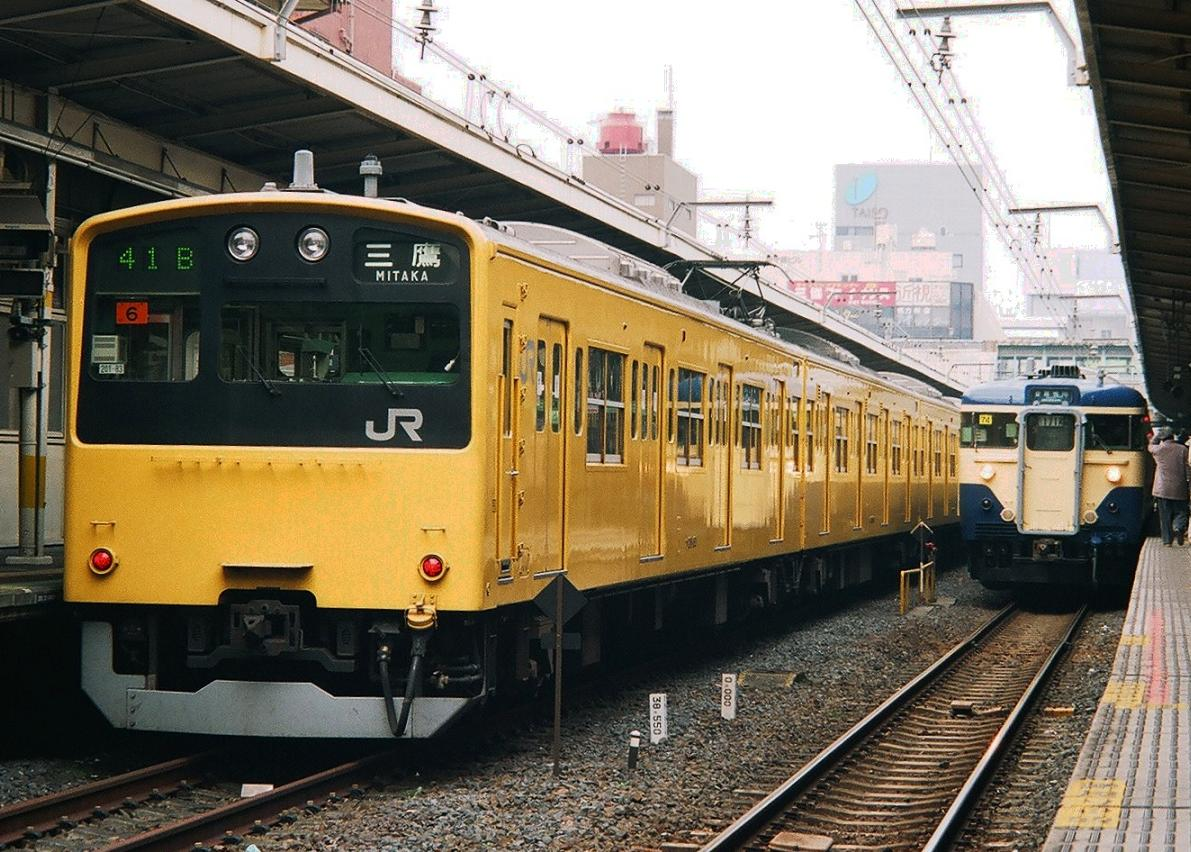
A Chūō-Sōbu Line 201 series in December 1998

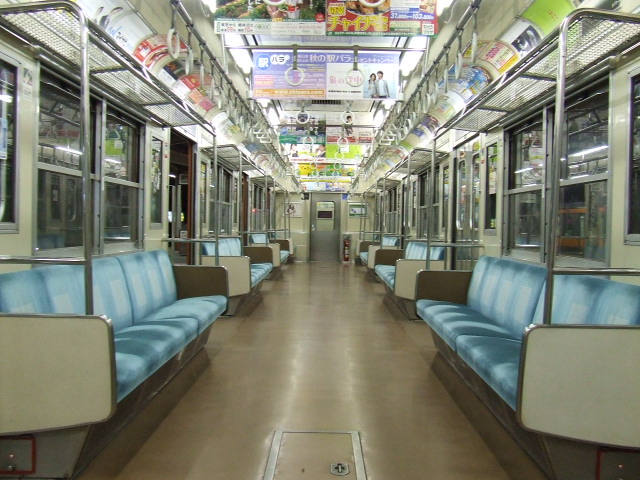
Interior view in October 2007

== Shikisai train ==
A 4-car 201 series set (W1) was modified in 2001 by JR East to become the special Shikisai (四季彩) tourist train, entering service on the Ōme Line from 4 August 2001. This train featured panorama windows and transverse seating bays on one side of the train only. It was repainted into a new livery in June 2005. The train was withdrawn from regular service at the end of June 2009, with a number of special finale runs scheduled for July.

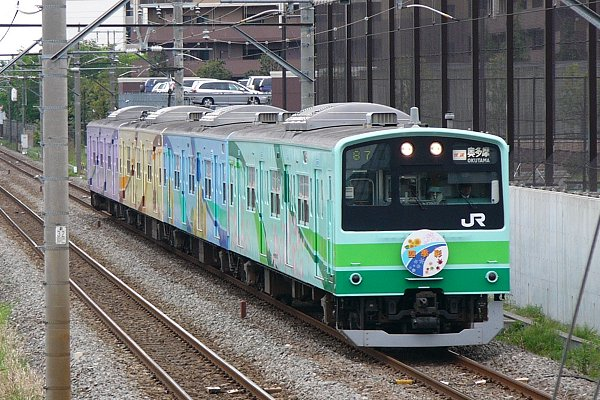
Shikisai train in original livery in May 2004

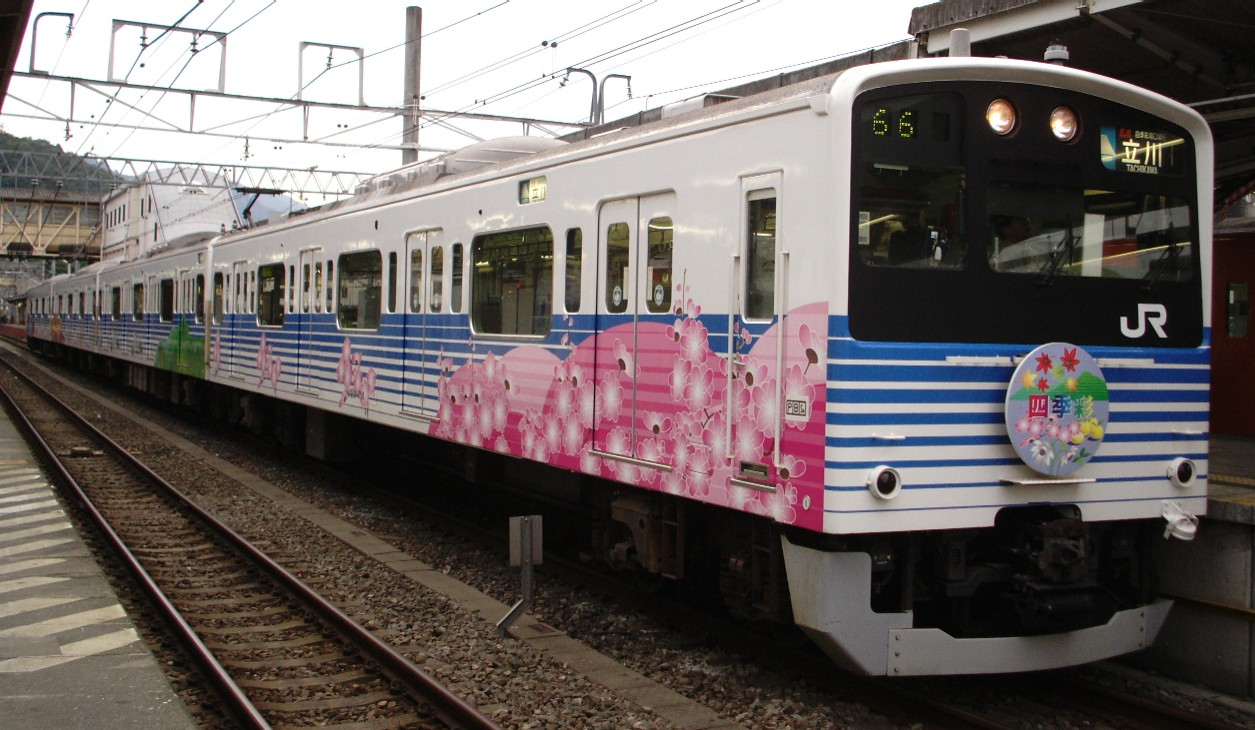
Shikisai train in revised livery (and windows) in June 2007

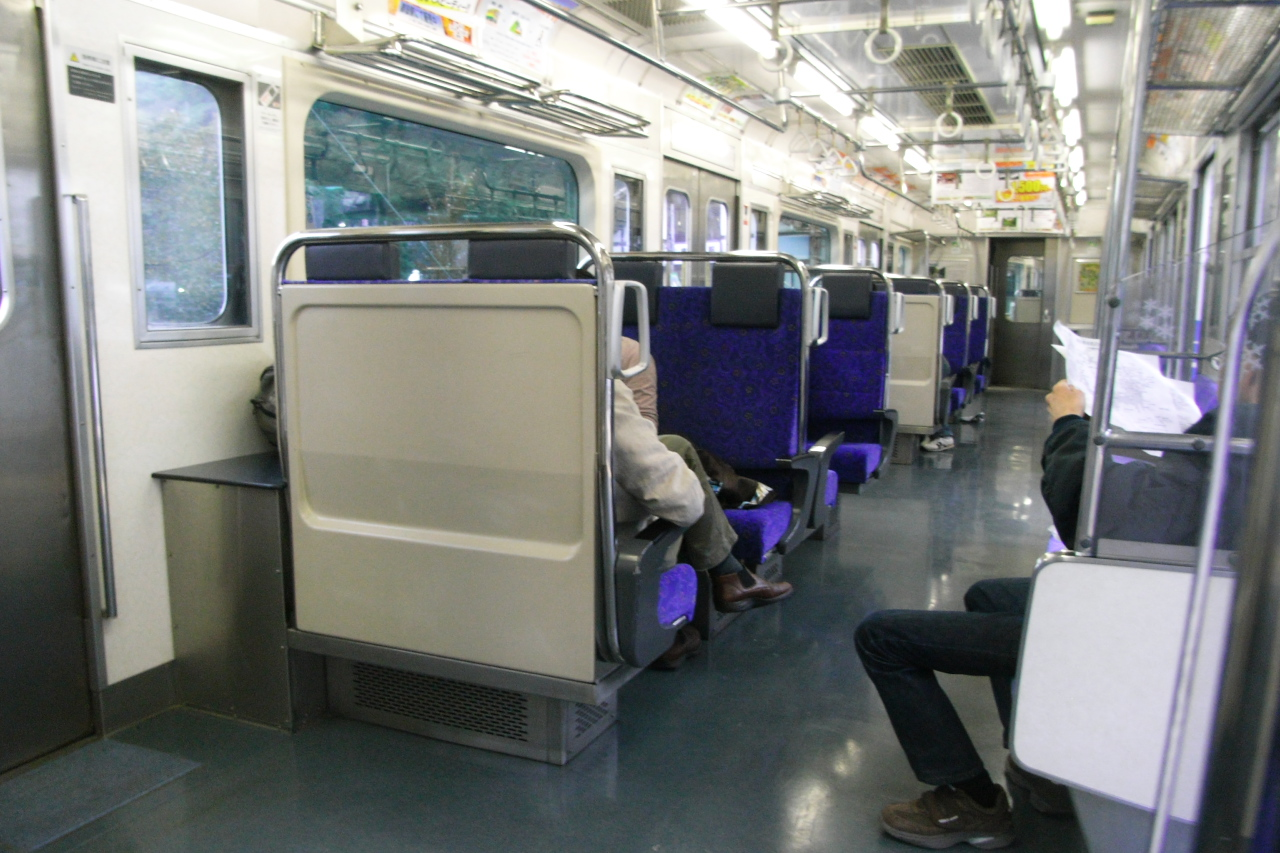
Interior view in November 2008

== Preserved examples ==
- KuHa 201-1: Formerly preserved at Toyoda Depot. Currently, in Ome Railway Park.
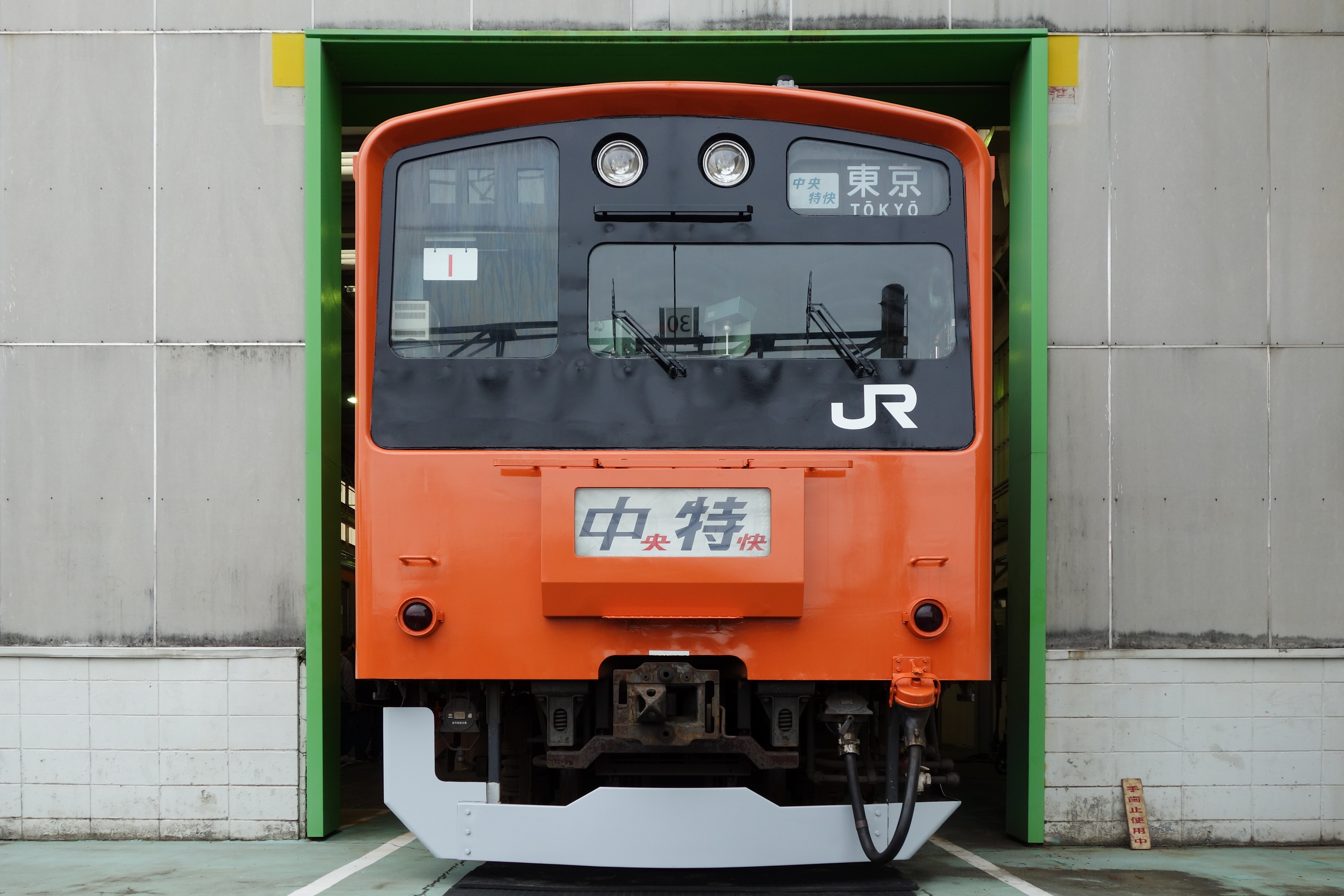
KuHa 201-1 at Toyoda Depot in 2014

== Accidents ==
On the evening of 12 October 1997, A 6-car Chuo Line 201 series trainset collided with a 12-car Super Azusa E351 series train which was passing through the Otsuki Station with a 2-minute delay at a running speed of 105 km/h (65 mph), while on the right side which is a damaged 201 series trainset which collided at a speed of 25 km/h (16 mph), the Super Azusa train derailed which has been led to decoupling of 4 cars (Car No. 5 to 9), while the last which had been rolled over to the ground. The accident resulted in 78 injuries but no recorded deaths. The main cause of this accident was about the shunting or decoupling of the two 201 series trainsets which was composed of 4 cars for Ome Line & 6 cars for Chuo Line Rapid, the 4-car set remained in Otsuki, while the 6-car set was leaving from the station for turnover, but there was a delayed Super Azusa train which was coming behind to the main line, resulting in collision.

After this incident, the management of JR East decided to abolish the shunting work that is required the existing ATS to be turned off, and they completely repaired the damaged trainset to let them back from service.
