= 323 series =

Japanese electric multiple unit type

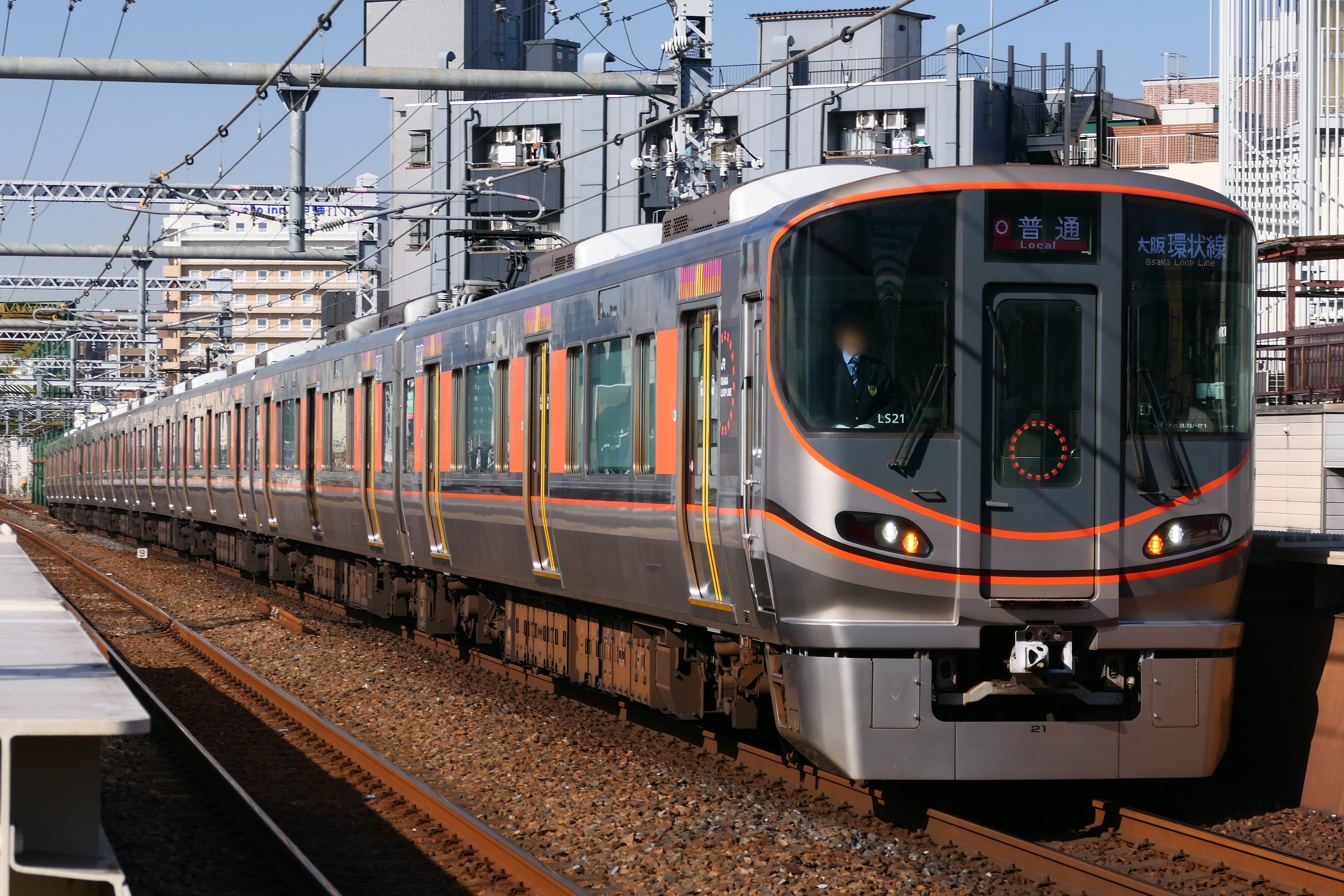
- Set LS21 on the Osaka Loop Line in December 2023
- Manufacturers: Kawasaki Heavy Industries, Kinki Sharyo
- Built at: Hyogo and Osaka
- Replaced: 103 series, 201 series
- Constructed: 2016–2019
- Entered service: 24 December 2016
- Number built: 176 vehicles (22 sets)
- Number in service: 176 vehicles (22 sets)
- Formation: 8 cars per trainset
- Fleet numbers: LS01–LS22
- Operator: JR West
- Lines served: O Osaka Loop Line; P Sakurajima Line

Specifications
- Car body construction: Stainless steel
- Car length: 20,000 mm (65 ft 7 in)
- Width: 2,950 mm (9 ft 8 in)
- Height: 3,630 mm (11 ft 11 in)
- Doors: 3 pairs per side
- Maximum speed: 100 km/h (62 mph)
- Traction system: Variable frequency (SiC-MOSFET)
- Power output: 220 kW per motor
- Acceleration: 2.8 km/(h⋅s) (1.7 mph/s)
- Deceleration: 3.9 km/(h⋅s) (2.4 mph/s)
- Electric system: 1,500 V DC
- Current collection: Overhead catenary
- Bogies: WDT63C (motored); WT246I (trailer, driving cars); WT246H (trailer, intermediate cars)
- Safety systems: ATS-SW2, ATS-P3 and Dead man's switch
- Track gauge: 1,067 mm (3 ft 6 in)

The 323 series (323系, 323-kei) is a DC electric multiple unit (EMU) train type operated by West Japan Railway Company (JR West) on the Osaka Loop Line in Osaka, Japan, since December 2016. The trains replaced the ageing 103 series and 201 series trains.

== Design ==
The eight-car trains have stainless steel bodies, and the exterior livery features orange highlights. Each car has three pairs of sliding doors per side, unlike the 103 and 201 series trains which have four pairs per side.

== Formation ==
The trains are formed of eight cars formed as follows, with all cars motored (only one motored bogie per car).

| Car No. | 1 | 2 | 3 | 4 | 5 | 6 | 7 | 8 |
|---|---|---|---|---|---|---|---|---|
| Designation | M'c | M | M' | M' | M5 | M' | M' | Mc |
| Numbering | KuMoHa 322-xx | MoHa 323-xx | MoHa 322-xx | MoHa 322-xx | MoHa 323-5xx | MoHa 322-xx | MoHa 322-xx | KuMoHa 323-xx |
| Weight (t) | 36.1 | 37.0 | 39.1 | 39.1 | 36.3 | 39.1 | 39.1 | 39.7 |
| Capacity (total/seated) | 139/43 | 153/49 | 153/49 | 153/49 | 153/49 | 153/49 | 153/49 | 140/35 |

Car 2 has two WPS28E single-arm pantographs, while cars 5 and 8 each have one.

Car 4 is designated as a women-only car.

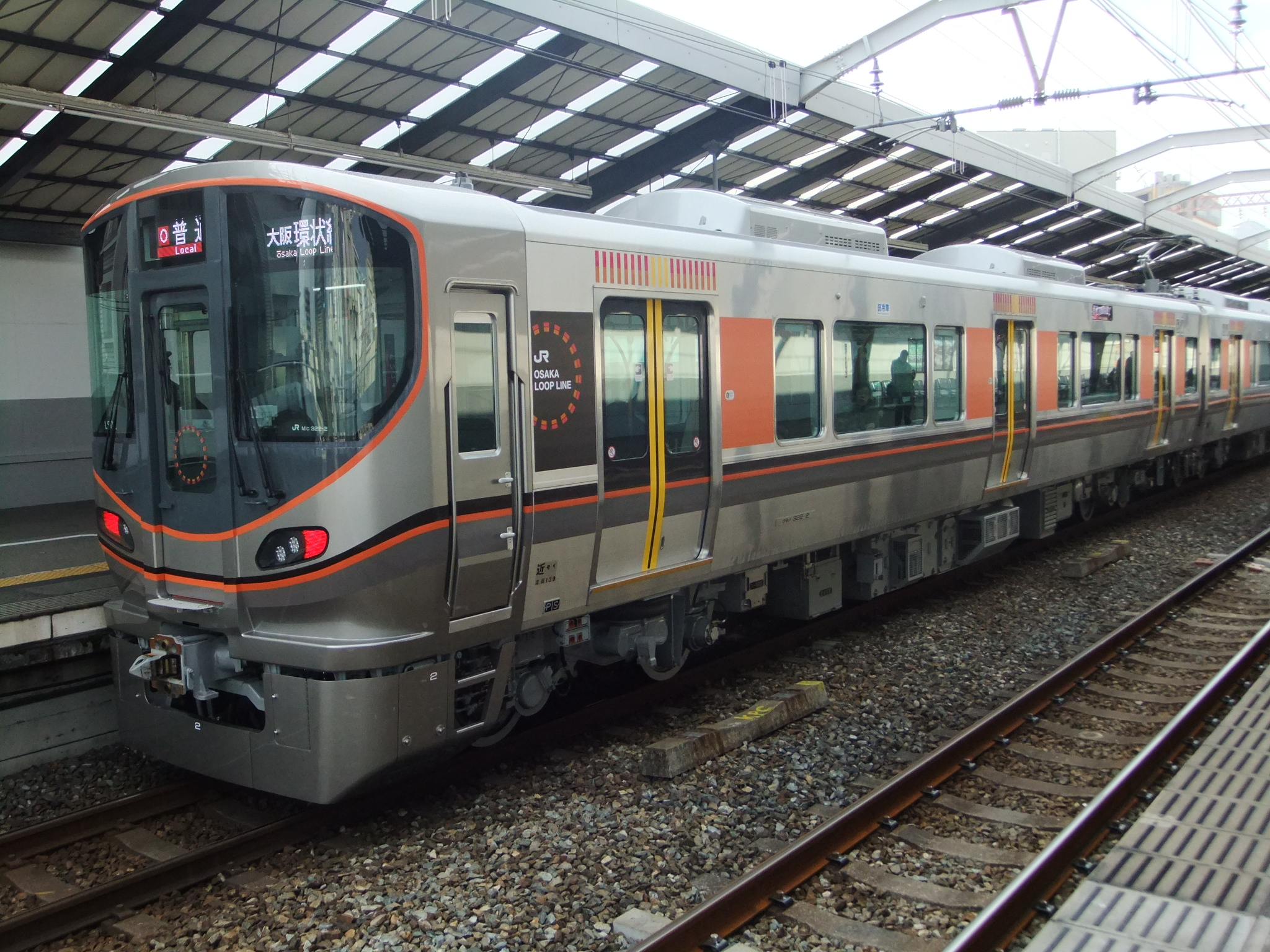
KuMoHa 322-2 in January 2017

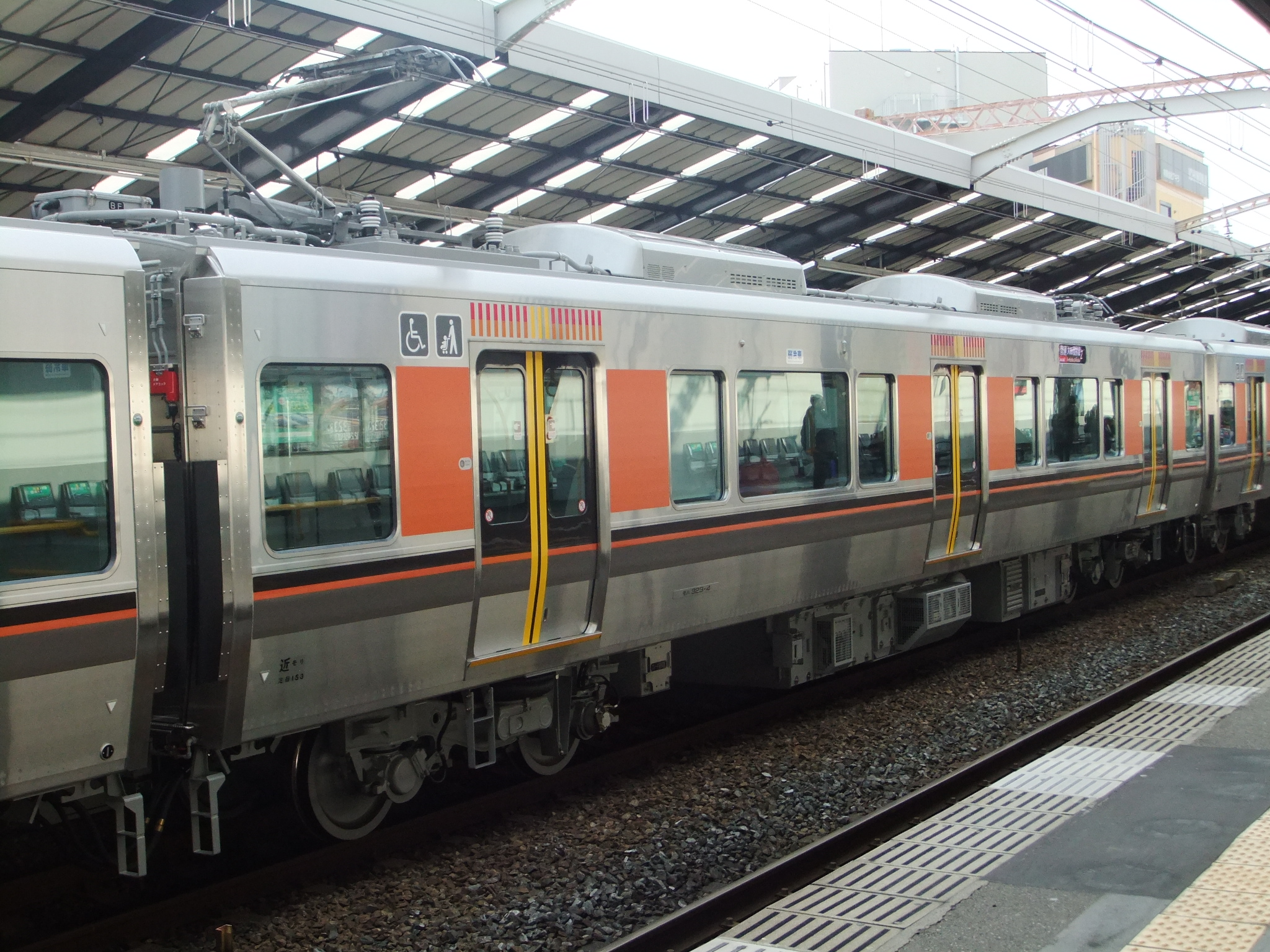
MoHa 323-4 in January 2017

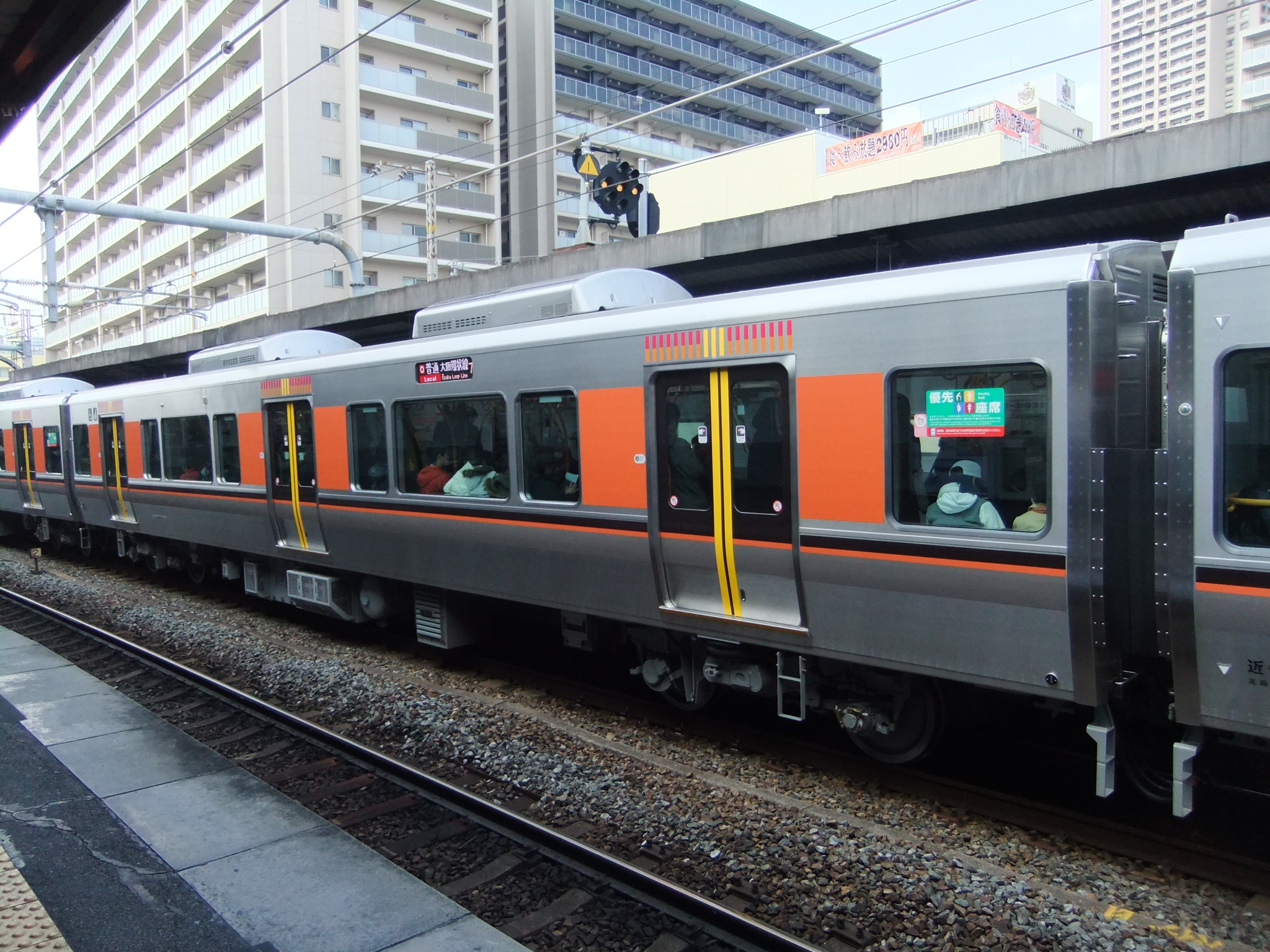
MoHa 322-5 in January 2017

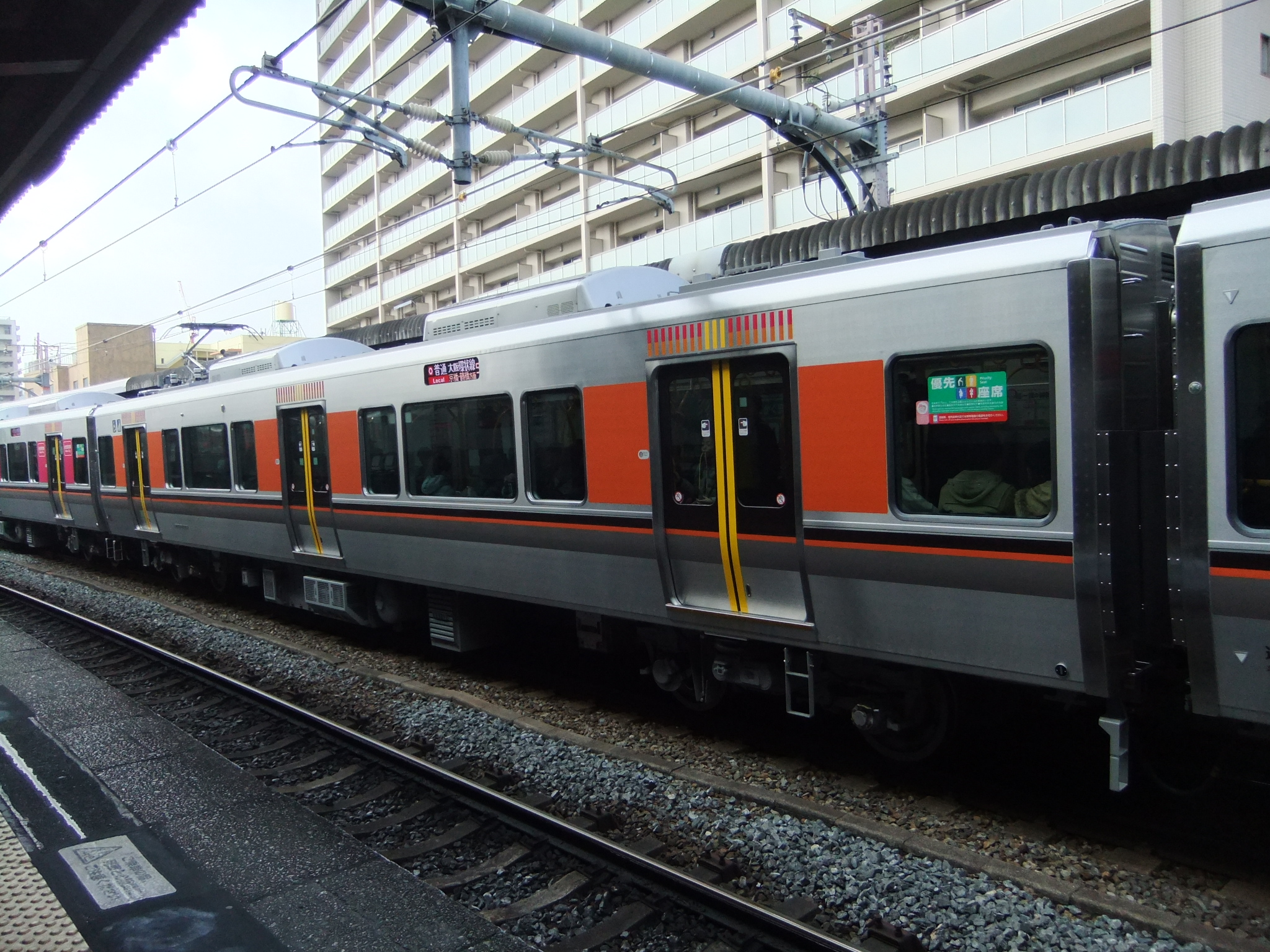
MoHa 323-503 in January 2017

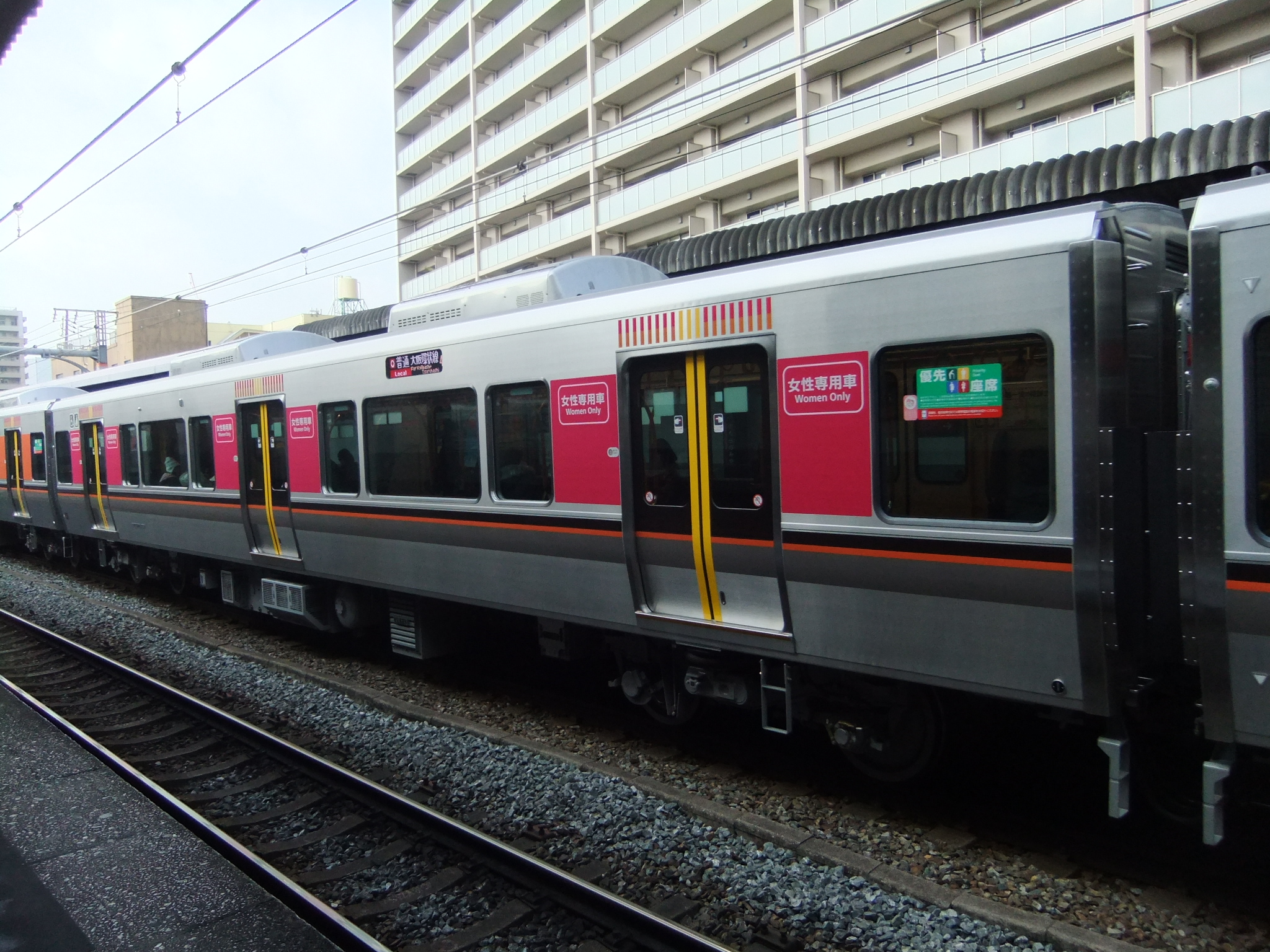
MoHa 322-7 in January 2017

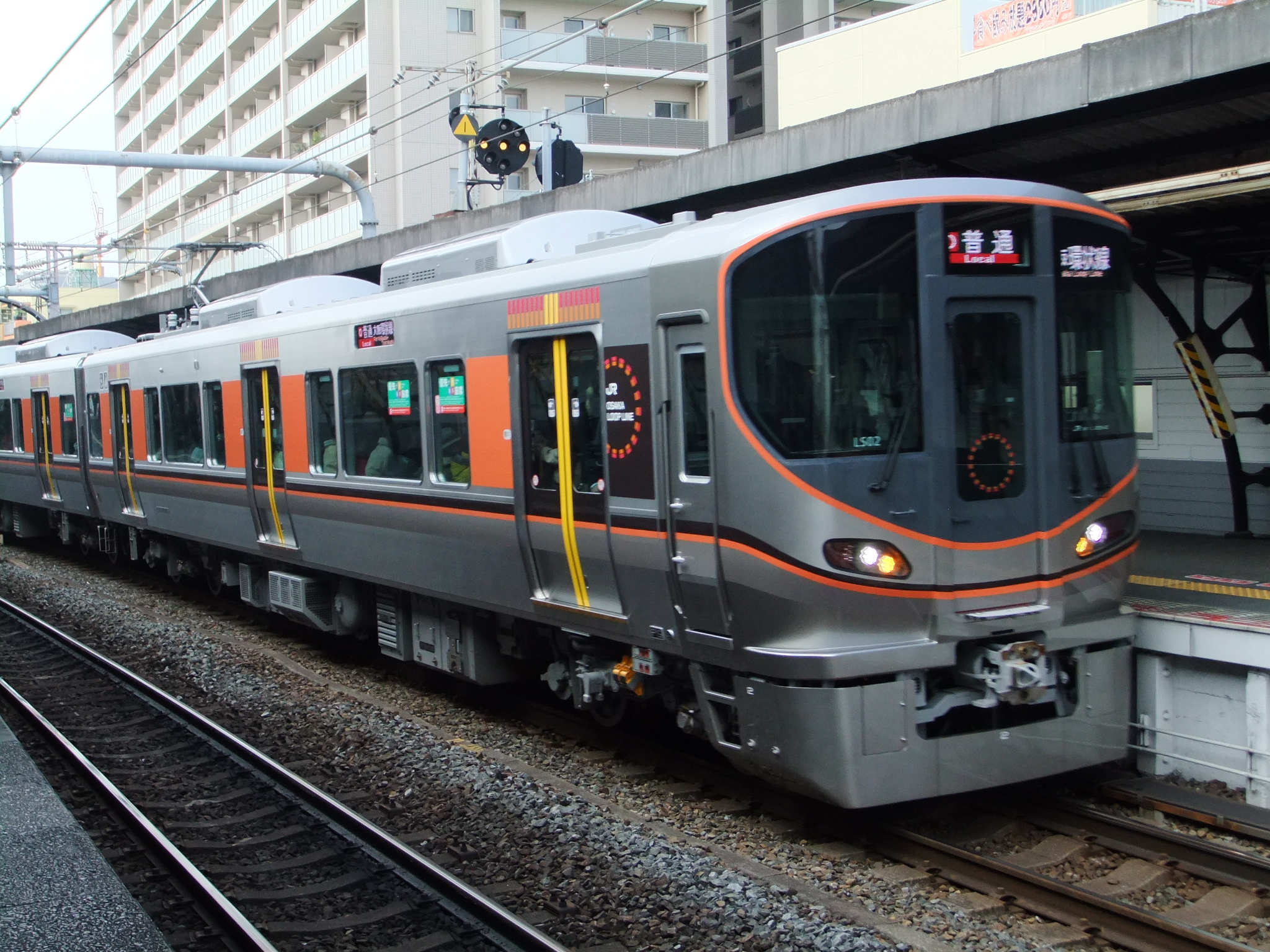
KuMoHa 323-2 in January 2017

== Interior ==
Passenger accommodation feature longitudinal bench seating throughout, with priority seating at one end of each car, and a wheelchair/stroller space at the opposite end. The passenger saloons use LED lighting, with the lighting in car 4 (women-only car) adjusted to have a more orange "tungsten lighting" tinge to distinguish it from other cars. On car 8, the seats closest to the doors are removed to improve passenger circulation. Passenger information announcements are provided in two languages, and information screens are in four languages (Japanese, English, Chinese, and Korean), with pairs of screens over each door, and pairs at either end of the cars. WiFi service is also provided.

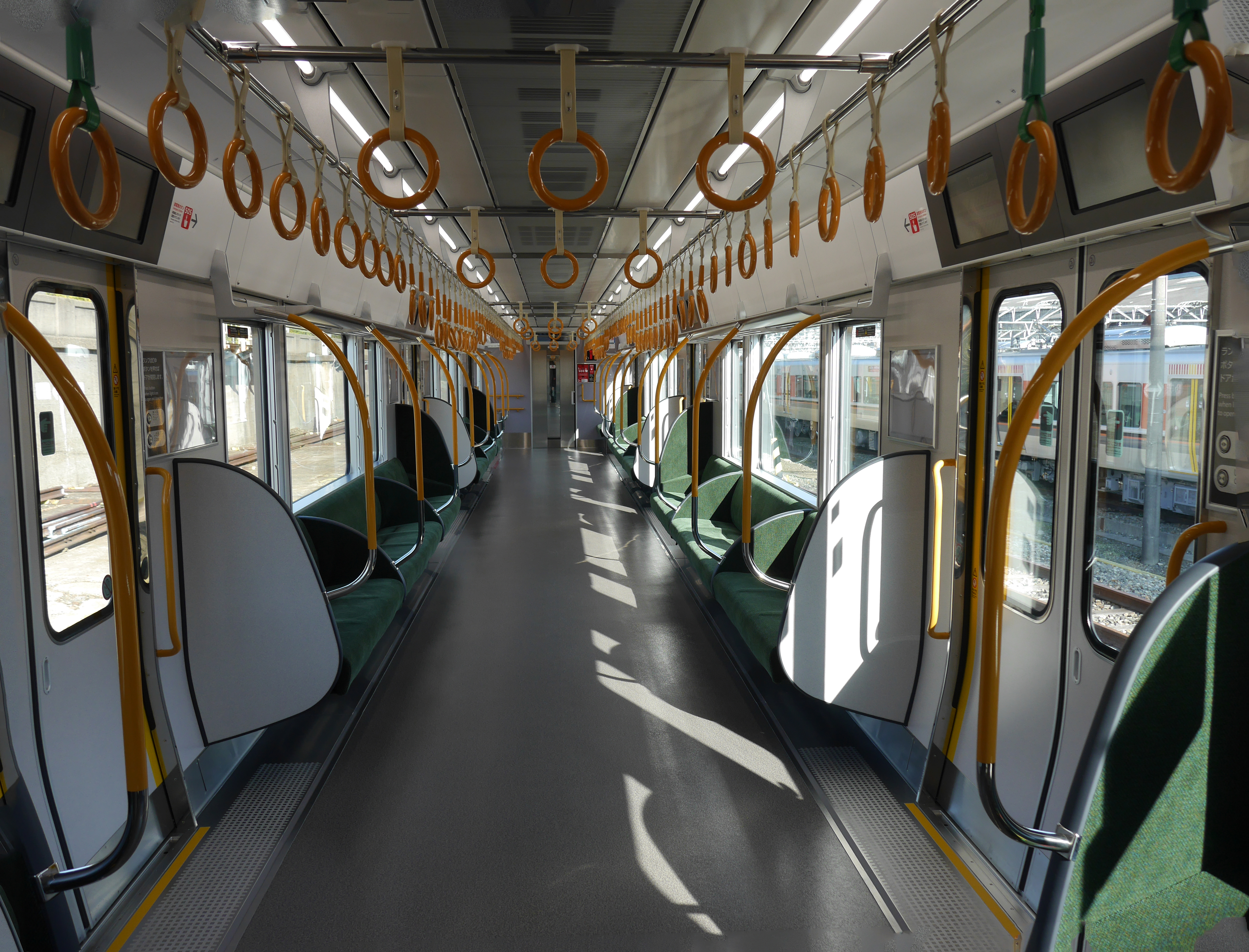
Interior of MoHa 322-2 in December 2016

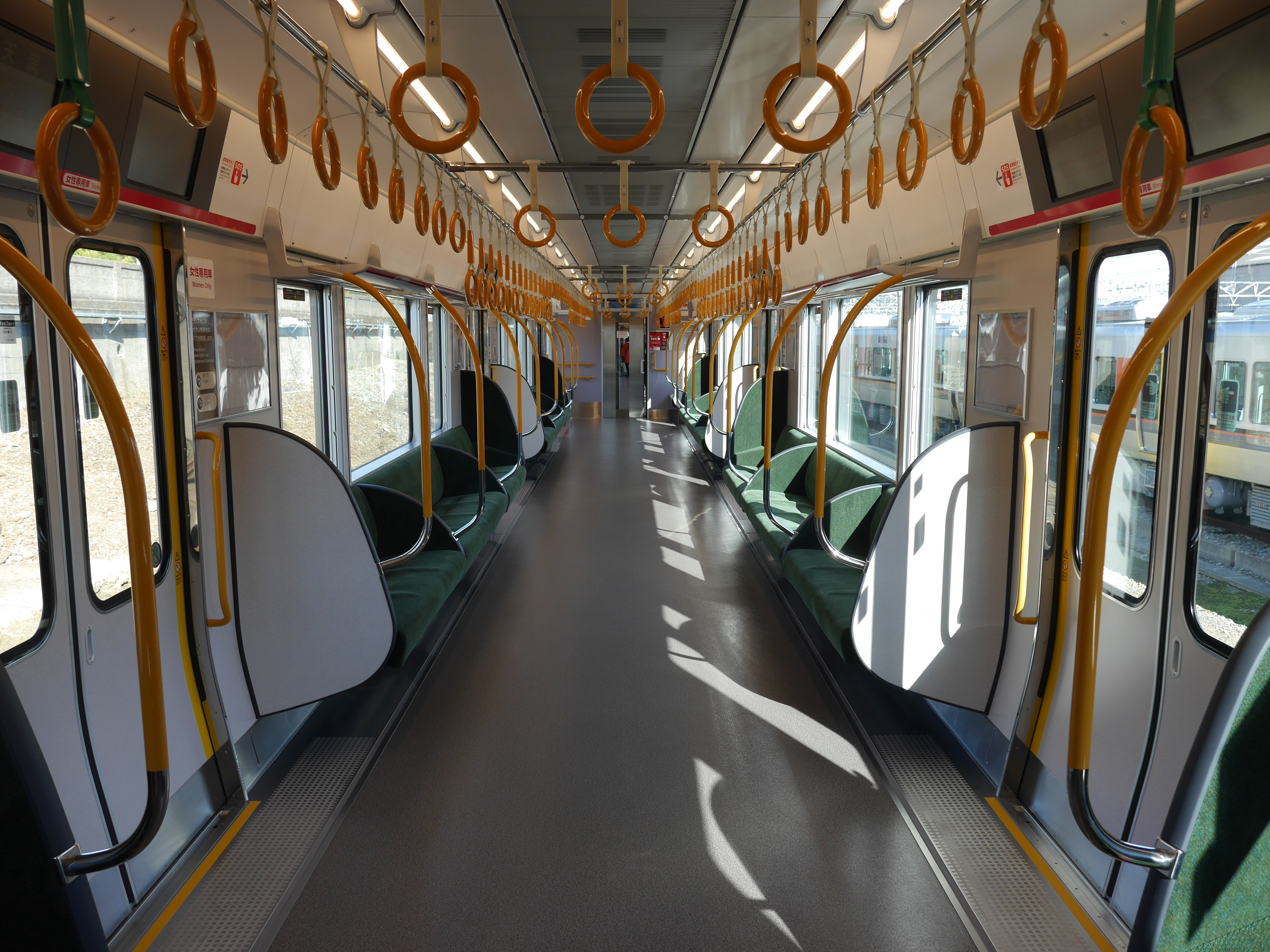
Interior of a women-only car in December 2016

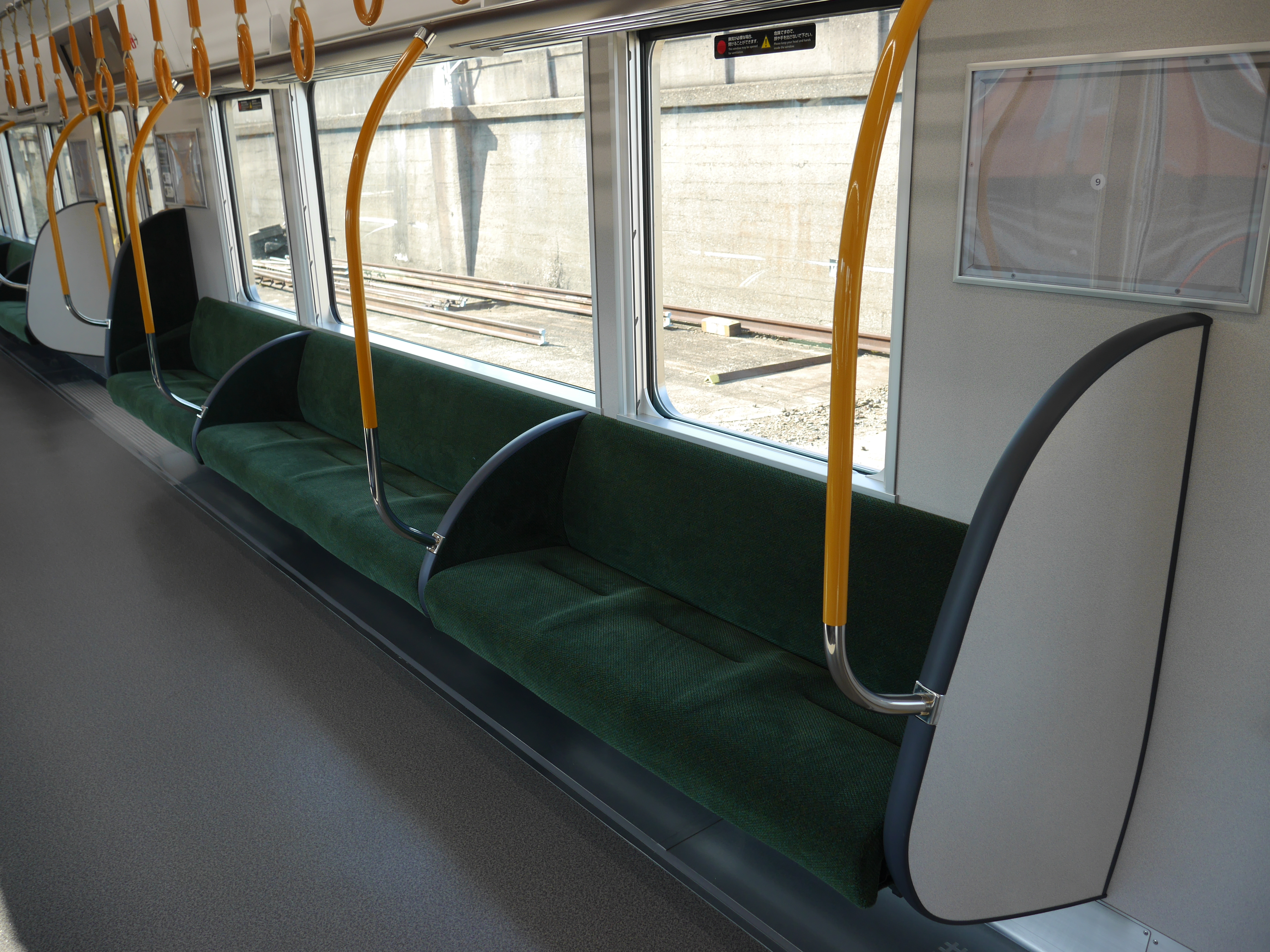
Bench seating in December 2016

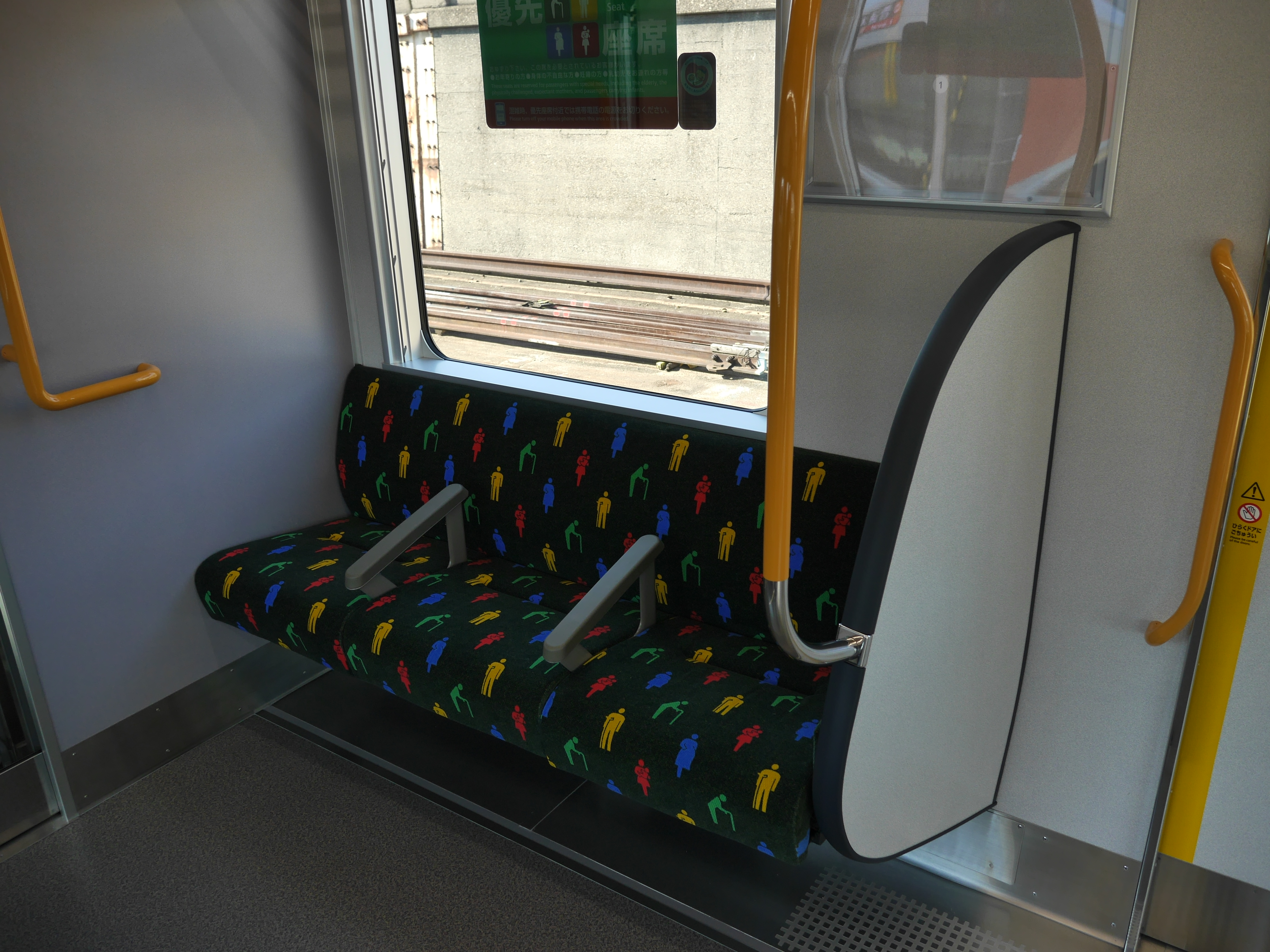
Priority seats at the end of a car in December 2016

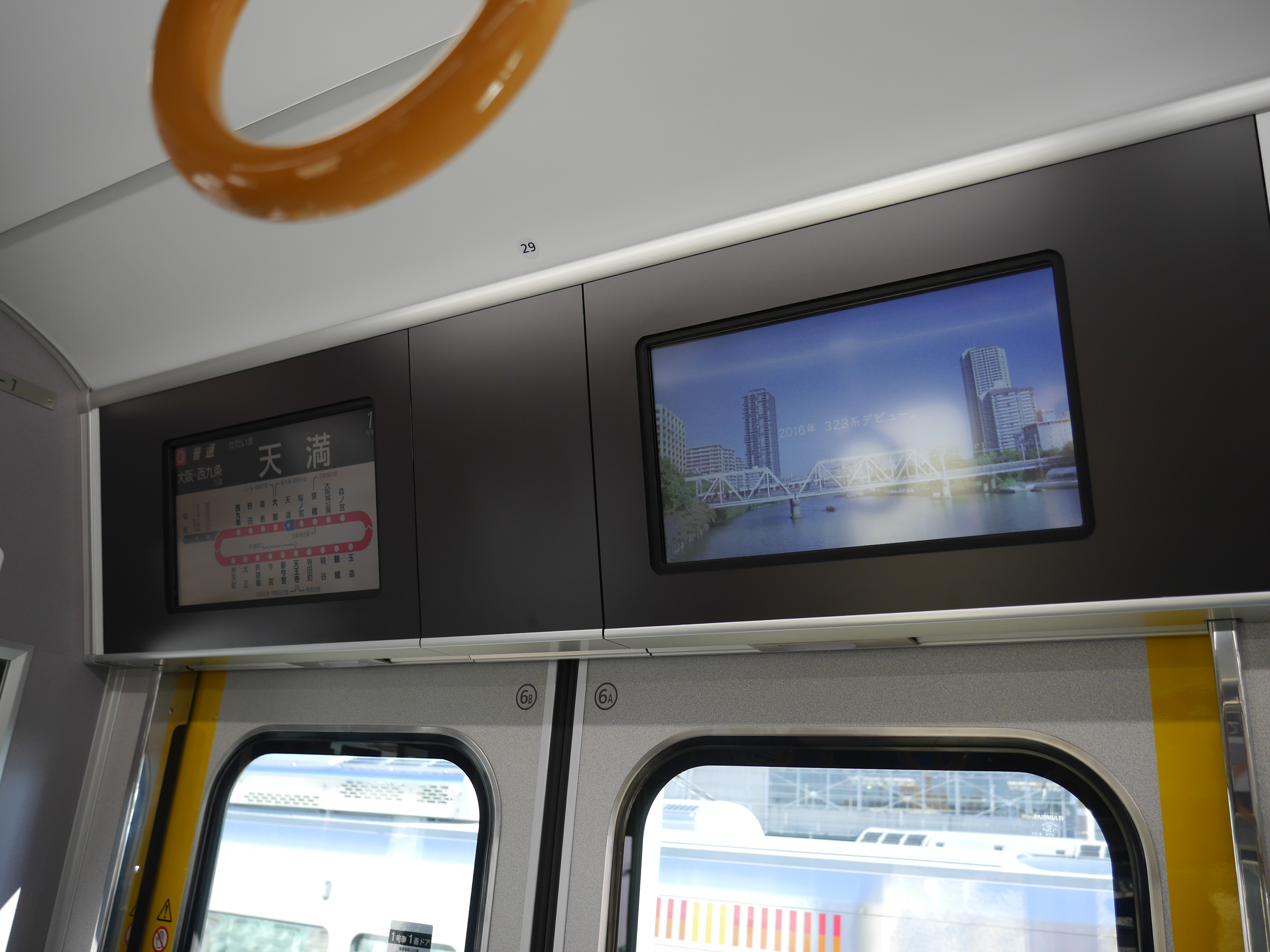
LCD passenger information screens above the doorways in December 2016

== History ==
Details of the new trains on order were first announced by JR West in December 2014. A total of 21 eight-car sets (168 vehicles) were scheduled to be introduced between fiscal 2016 and 2019, entirely replacing the fleet of twenty-three 103 and 201 series trains. The first trainset, LS01, was unveiled to the press at the Kinki Sharyo factory in Osaka on 24 June 2016, and delivered to JR West on 30 June. The trains entered revenue service on 24 December 2016.

== Build details ==
The build details for the fleet are as follows.

| Set No. | Manufacturer | Date delivered | Other |
|---|---|---|---|
| LS01 | Kinki Sharyo | 3 July 2016 | |
| LS02 | Kinki Sharyo | 25 October 2016 | |
| LS03 | Kinki Sharyo | 8 November 2016 | |
| LS04 | Kinki Sharyo | 22 November 2016 | |
| LS05 | Kinki Sharyo | 6 December 2016 | |
| LS06 | Kinki Sharyo | 22 December 2016 | |
| LS07 | Kinki Sharyo | 12 January 2017 | |
| LS08 | Kawasaki Heavy Industries | 18 May 2017 | |
| LS09 | Kinki Sharyo | 24 August 2017 | |
| LS10 | Kinki Sharyo | 7 September 2017 | |
| LS11 | Kinki Sharyo | 12 October 2017 | |
| LS12 | Kinki Sharyo | 9 November 2017 | |
| LS13 | Kawasaki Heavy Industries | 8 August 2018 | |
| LS14 | Kawasaki Heavy Industries | 19 September 2018 | |
| LS15 | Kawasaki Heavy Industries | 31 October 2018 | Super Nintendo World |
| LS16 | Kinki Sharyo | 22 January 2019 | |
| LS17 | Kinki Sharyo | 1 February 2019 | |
| LS18 | Kawasaki Heavy Industries | 4 March 2019 | |
| LS19 | Kinki Sharyo | 27 February 2019 | |
| LS20 | Kinki Sharyo | 15 March 2019 | |
| LS21 | Kinki Sharyo | 27 March 2019 | |
| LS22 | Kinki Sharyo | 29 August 2018 | |

== Gallery ==
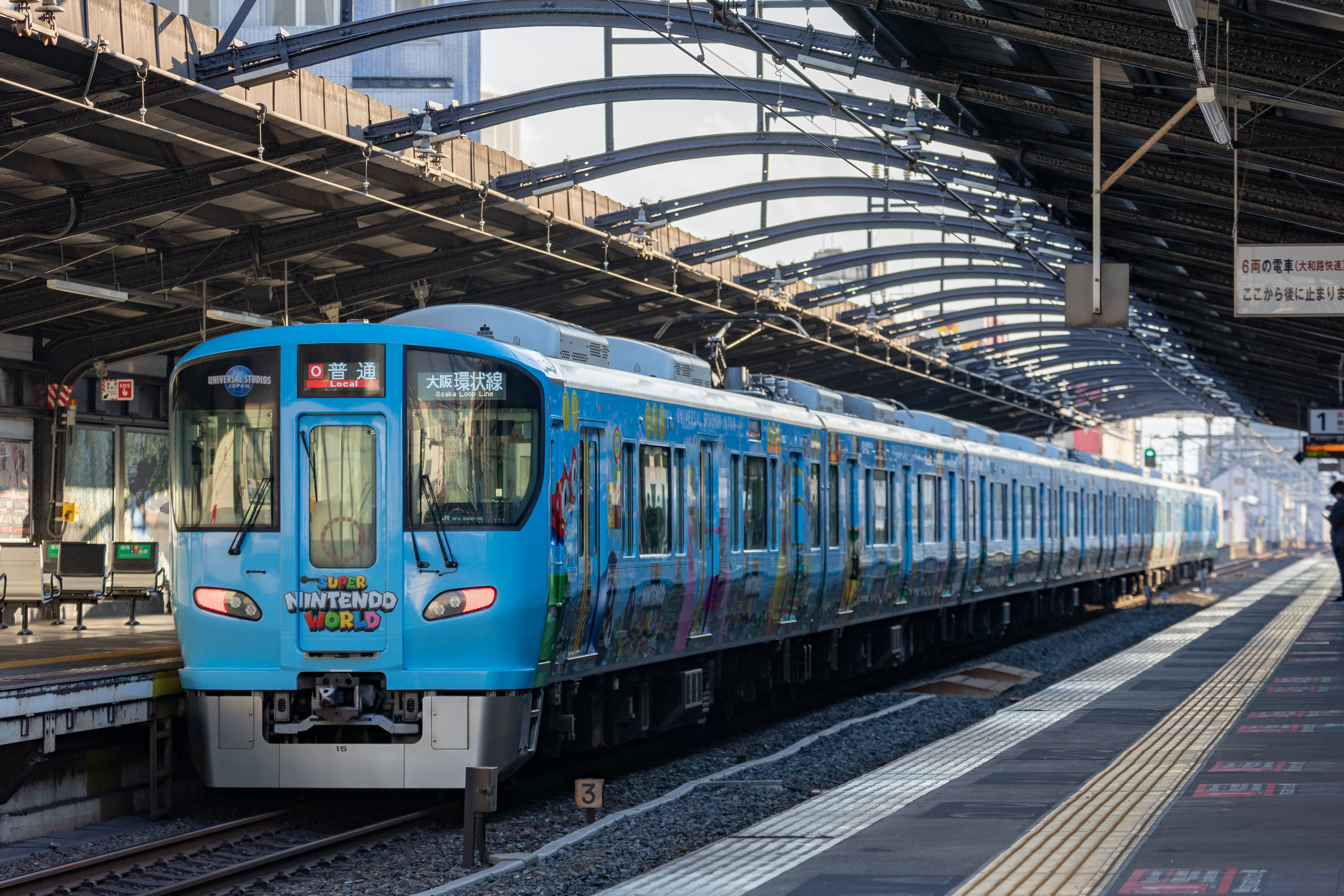
Set LS15 with a wrapped-over Super Nintendo World (Universal Studios Japan) advertisement

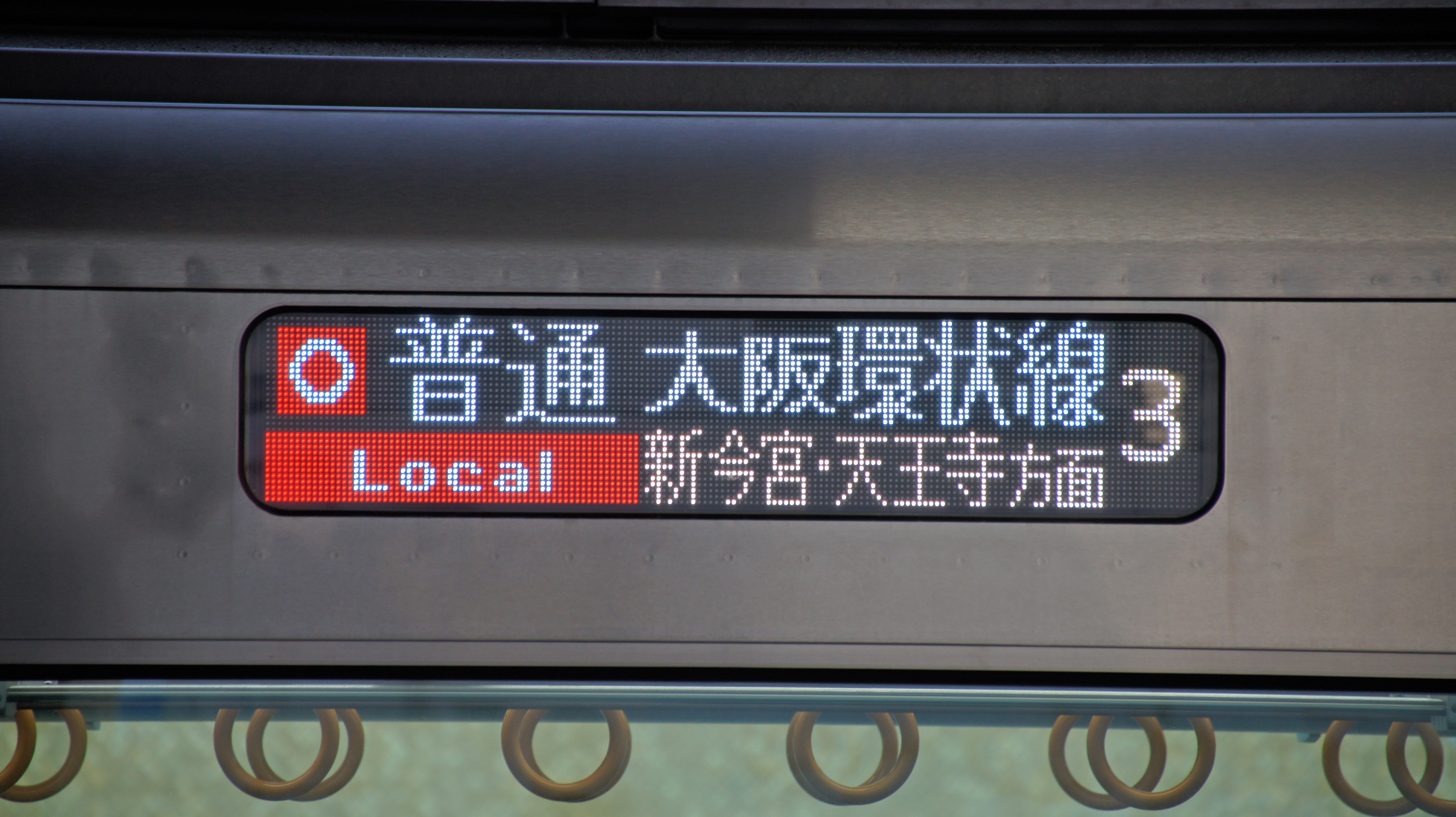
External destination board

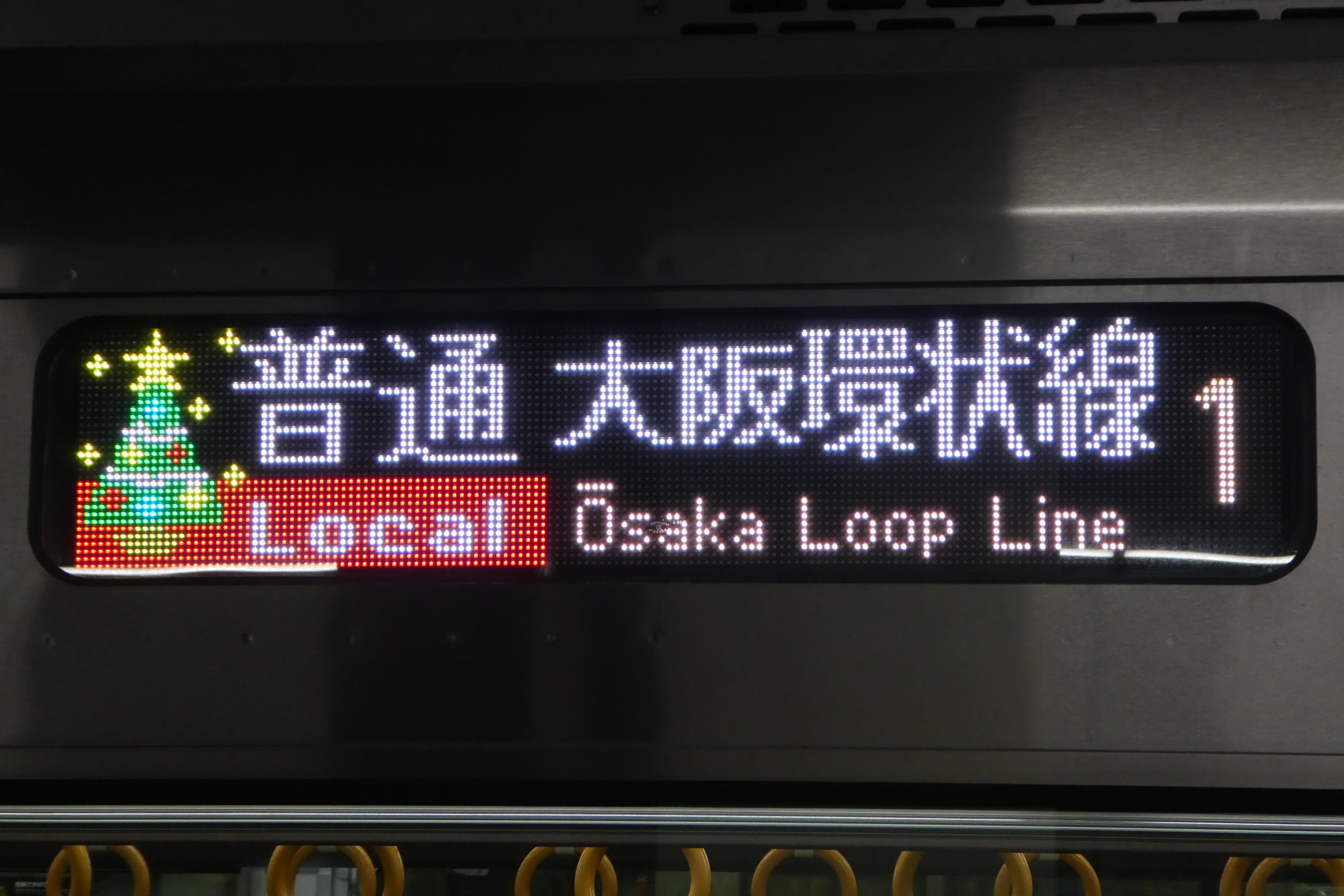
