= E233 series =

Japanese train type

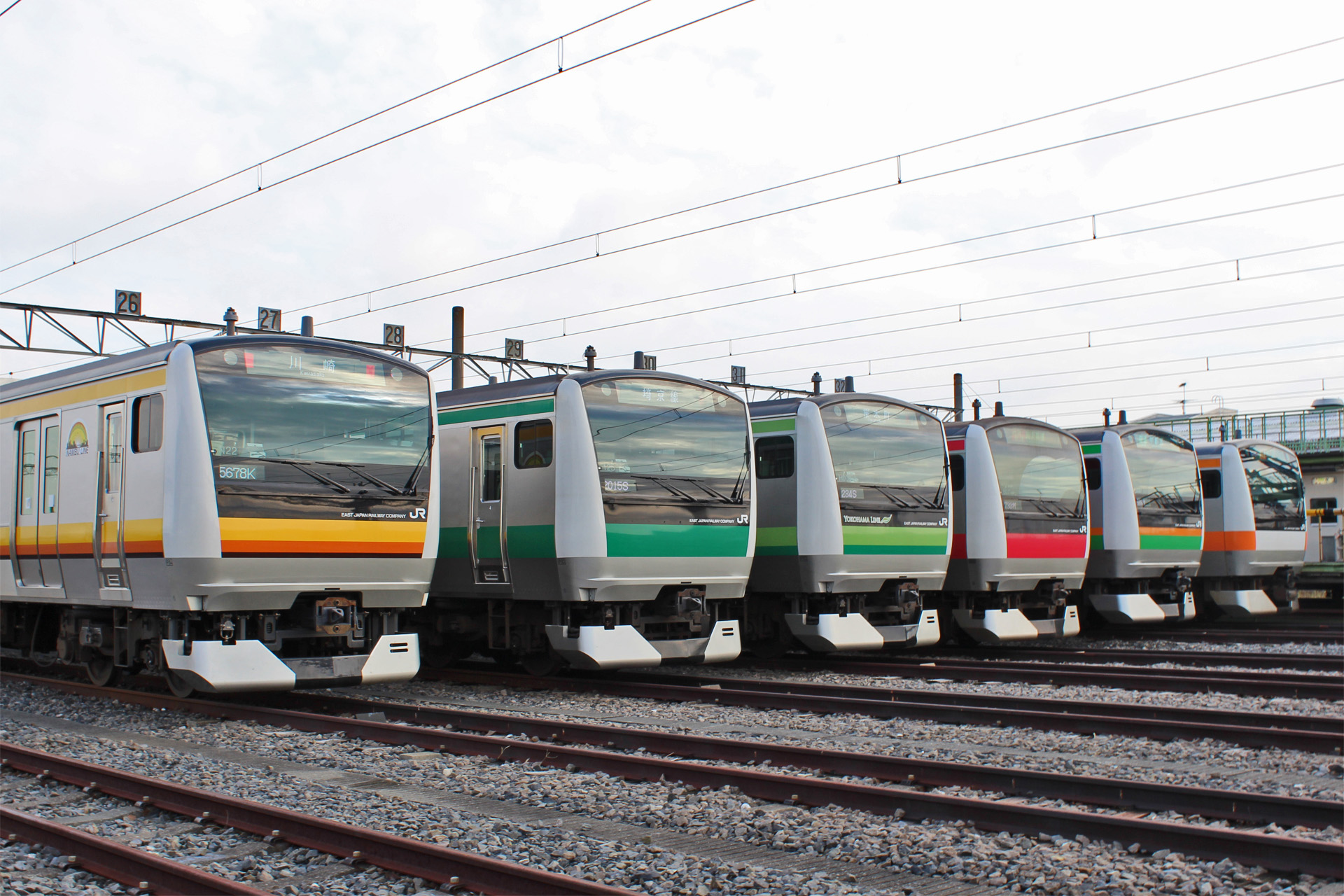
- A line-up of six different E233 series variants
- Manufacturers: JR East, Kawasaki Heavy Industries, Tokyu Car Corporation, J-TREC
- Replaced: 201 series, 203 series, 205 series, 207-900 series, 209 series, 211 series, E331 series
- Constructed: 2006–present
- Entered service: 26 December 2006
- Number in service: 3,297 vehicles (as of June 2020)
- Number scrapped: 10 cars (total, accident damage)
- Formation: 4/5/6/8/10/12 cars per trainset
- Operator: JR East
- Depots: Makuhari, Kamakura, Kawagoe, Keiyō, Kōzu, Matsudo, Oyama, Toyoda, Saitama

Specifications
- Car body construction: Stainless steel
- Car length: 20,000 mm (65 ft 7 in)
- Width: 2,950 mm (9 ft 8 in)
- Doors: 4 pairs per side
- Maximum speed: 120 km/h (75 mph)
- Traction system: IGBT–VVVF (Mitsubishi Electric (Note: 0, 1000, 2000, 5000, 6000, 7000, 8000, 8500) or Hitachi (Note: 3000))
- Traction motors: Type MT75 3-phase AC induction motors
- Acceleration: E233-0/-7000: 3 km/(h⋅s) (1.9 mph/s); -2000: 3.3 km/(h⋅s) (2.1 mph/s); -3000: 2.3 km/(h⋅s) (1.4 mph/s); Others: 2.5 km/(h⋅s) (1.6 mph/s)
- Deceleration: 5.2 km/(h⋅s) (3.2 mph/s) (emergency brake)
- Electric systems: Overhead line, 1,500 V DC
- Current collection: Pantograph
- Braking system: Regenerative brake
- Safety systems: ATS-P, ATS-SN, ATC, Digital ATC
- Coupling system: Shibata type
- Multiple working: E231-1000 series (for E233-3000 series only)
- Track gauge: 1,067 mm (3 ft 6 in)

The E233 series (E233系) is a commuter and suburban electric multiple unit (EMU) train type developed by East Japan Railway Company (JR East) from the earlier E231 series and the E531 series design. The first train was introduced in December 2006 for use on the Chūō Line (Rapid), followed by the E233-1000 series variant in 2007 for use on the Keihin–Tōhoku and Negishi lines, the E233-3000 series outer-suburban variant in December 2007 for use on the Tōkaidō Main Line, and narrow-bodied E233-2000 series variant for Jōban Line and Tokyo Metro Chiyoda Line through services. Further variants were built for use on the Keiyō Line, Yokohama Line, Saikyō Line, and Nambu Line.

== Design ==
The E233 series features two identical sets of main equipment in case of failure. This is the first JR East stock to feature such backup measures. The E233 series provides for better accessibility for the disabled, and is designed to be more comfortable to ride overall than previous stock. The height between the platform and the train was reduced from the 80 mm (3.1 in) of the 201 and 209 series to only 30 mm (1.2 in). Seats are 460 mm (18.1 in) wide, compared to the 430 mm (16.9 in) of the 201 series and 450 mm (17.7 in) of the 209 series. For standing passengers the handle straps have been lowered by 50 mm (2.0 in) compared to older train models.

This stock also features an air filtration system to remove unpleasant smells. It also features liquid crystal display information screens and automatic announcement system similar to those previously used on the E231 series rolling stock on the Yamanote Line.

The stock is the first JR East stock to use full-colour LEDs for the destination indicators on the sides of the carriages. This is due to the fact that the Chūō Line has numerous types of services, and colour-coding will help passengers board the correct train.

== Variants ==
- E233-0 series: 4-, 6-, and 10-car sets used on the Chūō Rapid, Ōme, Itsukaichi, Hachikō and Fujikyuko lines since 26 December 2006.
- E233-1000 series: 10-car sets used on the Keihin–Tōhoku and Negishi lines since 22 December 2007, on the Keiyō Line since 7 May 2026.
- E233-2000 series: 10-car sets used on Jōban Line/Tokyo Metro Chiyoda Line through services since 9 September 2009
- E233-3000 series: 5- and 10-car sets used on Tōkaidō Main Line, Takasaki Line, and Utsunomiya Line outer-suburban services since March 2008, and on Ueno–Tokyo Line and Shōnan–Shinjuku Line through services since March 2015
- E233-5000 series: 4-, 6-, and 10-car sets used on the Keiyō Line since 1 July 2010
- E233-6000 series: 8-car sets used on the Yokohama Line since 16 February 2014
- E233-7000 series: 10-car sets used on the Saikyō Line, Kawagoe Line and Rinkai Line since 30 June 2013, and on Sōtetsu Shin-Yokohama Line and Sōtetsu Main Line services since November 2019
- E233-8000 series: 6-car sets used on the Nambu Line since 4 October 2014
- E233-8500 series: One converted former E233-0 series 6-car set used on the Nambu Line from 2017

== E233-0 series ==
E233-0 series
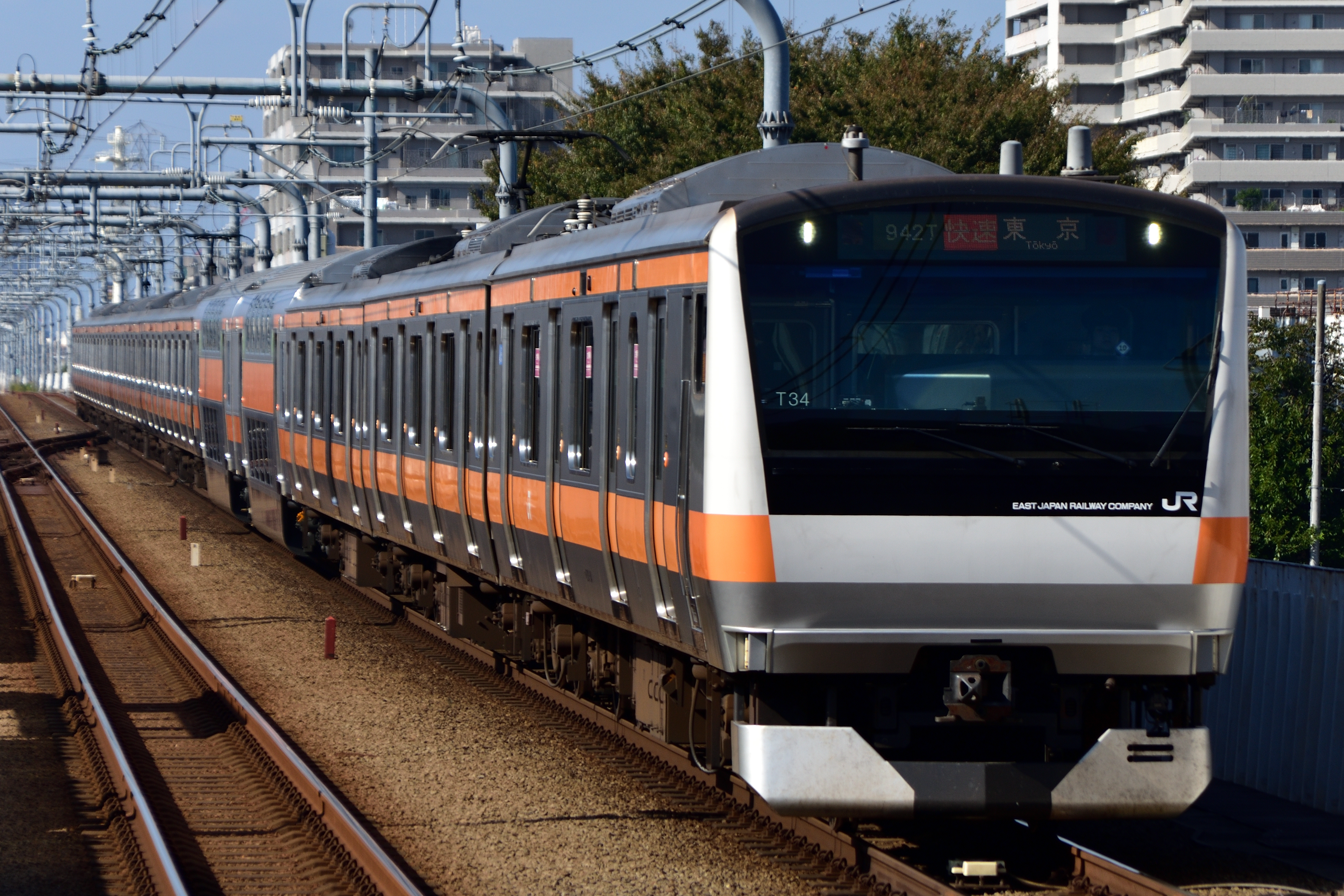
- Chūō Line 12-car set T34 featuring a pair of Green Cars
- Manufacturers: JR East Niitsu, Kawasaki Heavy Industries, Tokyu Car, J-TREC
- Replaced: 201 series
- Constructed: 2006–2009, 2020; 2022–present (Green cars)
- Entered service: 26 December 2006
- Scrapped: 2008 (accident damage)
- Number under construction: 114 vehicles
- Number built: 705 vehicles
- Number in service: 692 vehicles (95 sets) (+6 vehicles converted to E233-8500 series)
- Number scrapped: 5 vehicles (accident damage)
- Formation: 4/6/8/10/12 cars per trainset
- Fleet numbers: T1–T42, T71, H43–H59, Ao459–Ao467, Ao659–Ao669, P518, P521, P523–P525
- Operator: JR East
- Depot: Toyoda
- Lines served: Chūō Line (Rapid); Ōme Line; Itsukaichi Line; ■ Hachikō Line; ■ Fujikyuko Line

Specifications
- Car body construction: Stainless steel
- Car length: 20,000 mm (65 ft 7 in)
- Width: 2,950 mm (9 ft 8 in)
- Height: 3,620 mm (11 ft 11 in)
- Floor height: 1,130 mm (3 ft 8 in)
- Doors: 4 pairs per side (standard cars); 2 pairs per side (Green cars)
- Electric systems: 1,500 V DC overhead catenary
- Current collection: PS33D pantograph
- Bogies: DT71 (motor), TR255 (trailer)
- Track gauge: 1,067 mm (3 ft 6 in)

The first E233-0 series train was introduced in December 2006 for use on the Chūō Line (Rapid), Ōme, and Itsukaichi lines, replacing the aging 201 series trains. The fleet of 688 E233-0 series vehicles (10-car x 42, 6-car x 28, 4-car x 25) was delivered by the end of March 2008; 42 ten-car sets (T1-T42), and 15 6+4-car sets (H43-H57) were constructed primarily for use on the Chūō Line (but also on through services to the Ōme, Itsukaichi, Hachikō, and Fujikyuko Lines), while ten four-car sets (Ao458-Ao467) and 13 six-car sets (Ao658-Ao670) were constructed for the Ōme Line and Itsukaichi Line. In March 2008 and April 2015, sets Ao458+Ao658 and Ao459+Ao659 were transferred to the Chūō Line and renumbered H58 and H59 respectively.

An additional five cars were built at JR East's Niitsu factory in 2009 to replace five cars from six-car set Ao661 which were withdrawn due to accident damage in 2008.

=== Green Car introduction ===
In April 2018, JR East announced plans to add two bilevel Green (first class) cars to 58 ten-car and six-car E233-0 series EMU sets operated on the Chūō Line and through-service trains to the Ōme Line, and to install toilets on these sets ahead of Green car introductions. To compensate for train shortages brought on by toilet installations, a new ten-car set (T71) was delivered from J-TREC's Yokohama facility on 11 June 2020.

The Green cars will be positioned as cars 4 and 5 in the newly formed 12- and 8-car sets. Green car services were initially due for introduction in fiscal 2020, but this was deferred to 2023. On 27 April 2022, JR East announced that Green car introductions would again be postponed until the end of fiscal 2024 or later as a result of the global chip shortage.

The first Green cars, SaRo E233-1 and SaRo E232-1, were delivered from J-TREC's Yokohama facility from 12 July 2022. These cars use double-leaf sliding doors with a width of 1,300 mm (51 in) to allow for reduced boarding times at stations; previous designs were built using single-leaf doors with a width of 810 mm (32 in). Test runs of the new Green cars were conducted, starting with set H57. The new Green cars were eventually put into service on a trial basis as of 13 October 2024.

=== Transfer ===
In 2017, six-car set Ao670 was modified to become the E233-8500 series set N36 for use on the Nambu Line alongside the fleet of E233-8000 series sets.

In December 2025, ten-car set T71 was transferred to Makuhari Depot as a six-car set and renumbered C1. Six cars from set H49 followed suit in January 2026 and became set C3, while four cars from set H49 was renumbered as set C2, lengthened as six cars from former two cars of set T71. On 10 September 2026, JR East announced that the 6 car E233s will be rolled out in the Boso Area in October 2026.

=== Interior ===
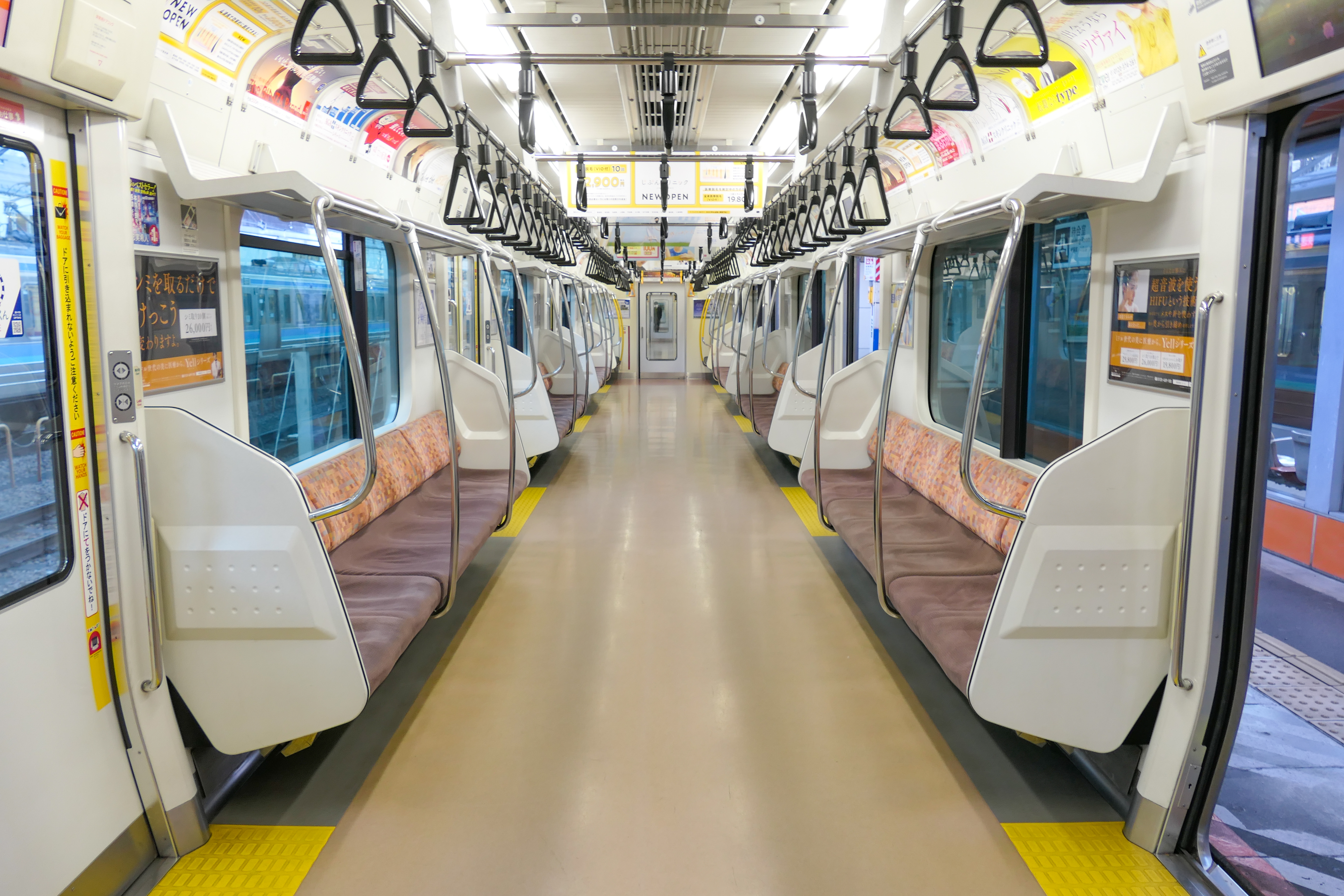
Chūō Line E233-0 series interior in January 2022

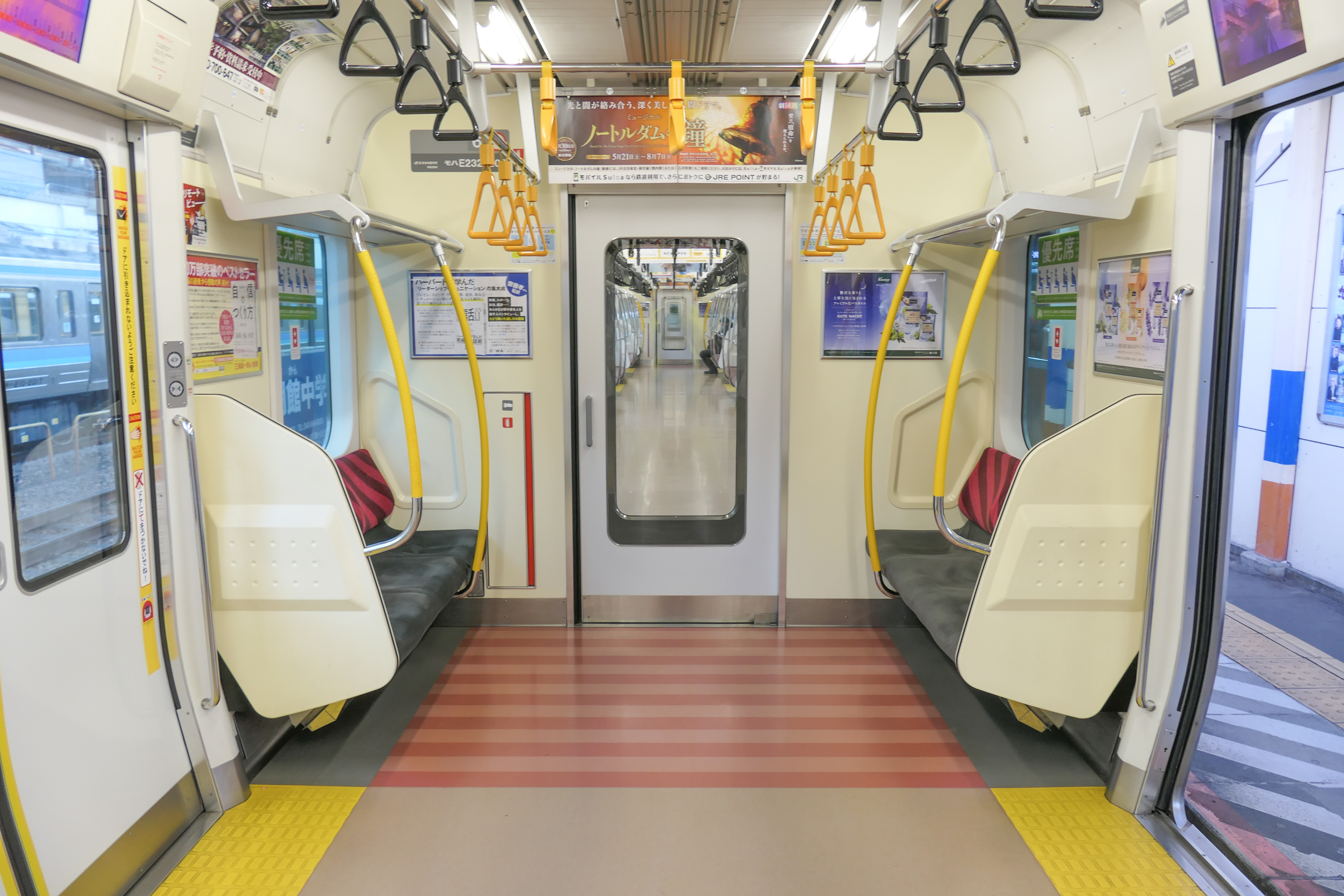
Priority seating in January 2022

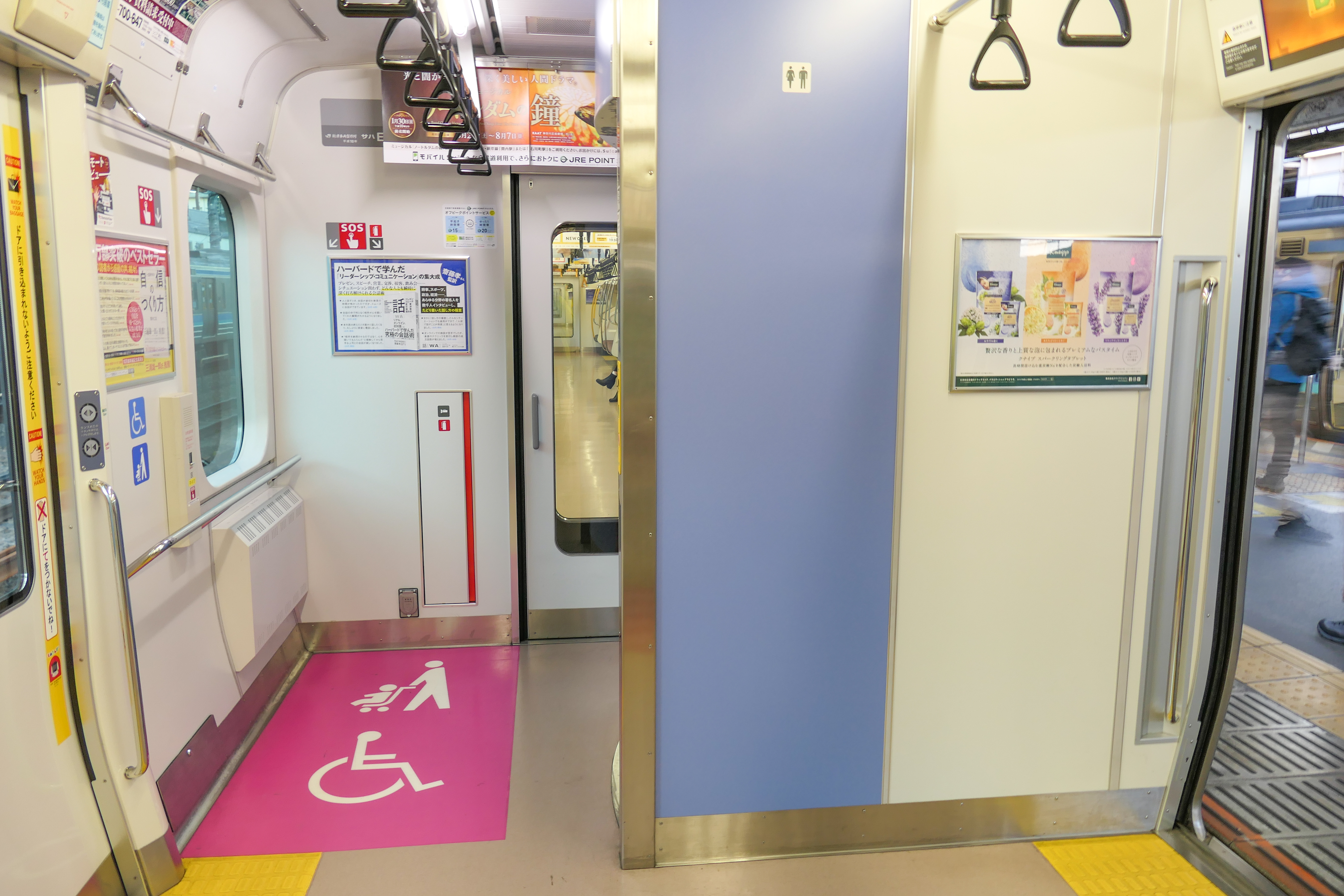
Universal design toilet in January 2022

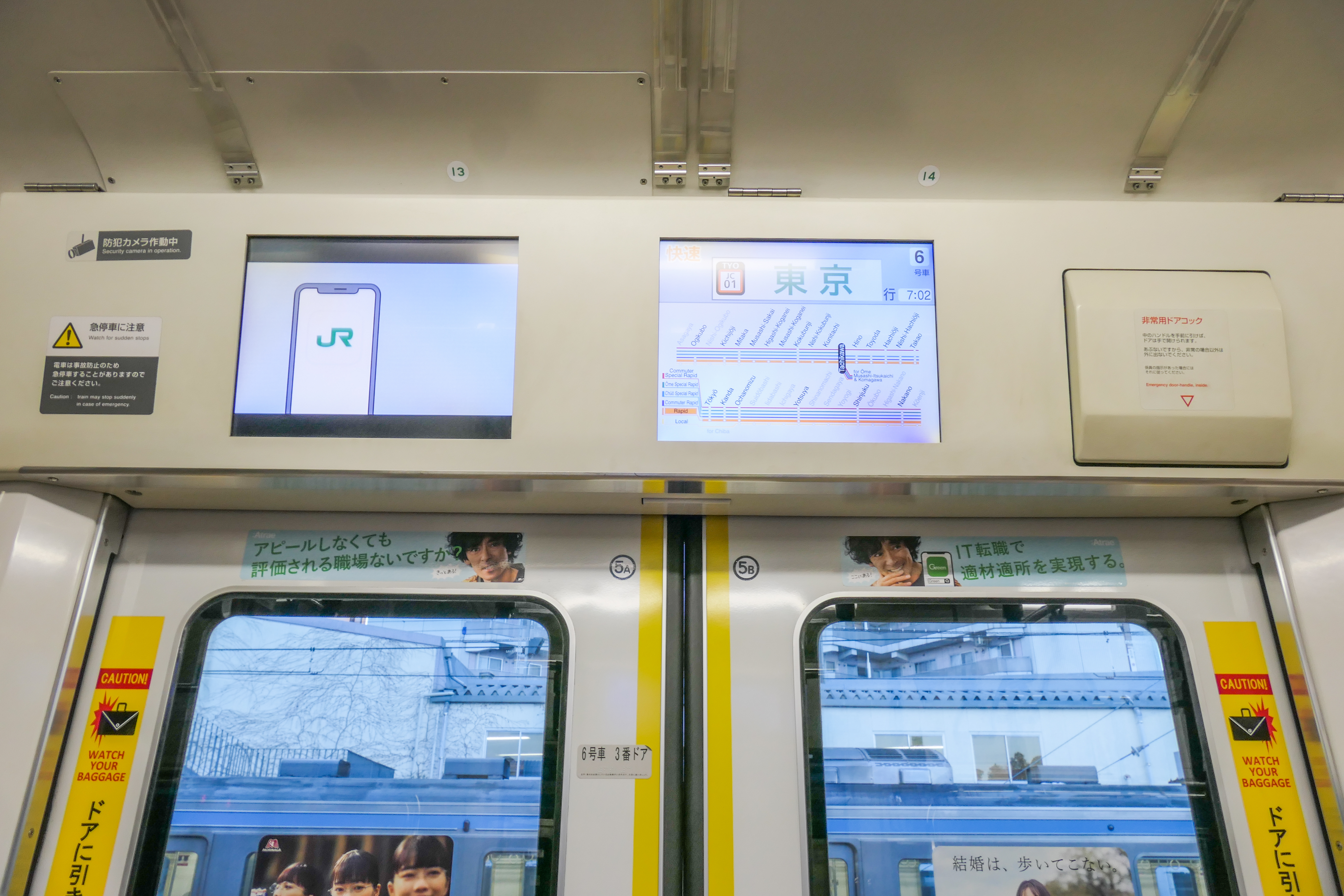
LCD passenger information display above door in January 2022

=== Formations ===
==== 10-car Chūō Line sets ====
As of 11 June 2020, 43 ten-car sets (T1-T42 and T71) are based at Toyoda Depot and formed with six motored ("M") cars and four non-powered trailer ("T") cars.

| | ← Tōkyō Ōtsuki, Ōme → | | | | | | | | | |
| Car No. | 1 | 2 | 3 | 4 | 5 | 6 | 7 | 8 | 9 | 10 |
Sets with on-board toilet
| Designation | Tc | M | M' | T | M | M' | T | M | M' | Tc' |
| Numbering | KuHa E233 | MoHa E233 | MoHa E232 | SaHa E233-500 | MoHa E233-200 | MoHa E232-200 | SaHa E233 | MoHa E233-400 | MoHa E232-400 | KuHa E232 |
| Capacity (total/seated) | 142/39 | 160/54 | | 155/48 | 160/54 | | | | | 142/39 |
Sets without on-board toilet
| Designation | Tc | M | M' | M | M' | T | | M | M' | Tc' |
| Numbering | KuHa E233 | MoHa E233 | MoHa E232 | MoHa E233-200 | MoHa E232-200 | SaHa E233-500 | SaHa E233 | MoHa E233-400 | MoHa E232-400 | KuHa E232 |
| Capacity (total/seated) | 142/39 | 160/54 | | | | | | | | 142/39 |

- MoHa E233-200 and MoHa E233-400 cars each have one PS33D single-arm pantograph, and MoHa E233 cars has two PS33D single-arm pantographs (one used as a backup).
- Cars 1 and 10 have a wheelchair space (also car 4 in sets equipped with a toilet).
- Car 4 has a universal design toilet (in sets equipped with a toilet).
- Car 4 is designated as a mildly air-conditioned car.

==== 6+4-car Chūō Line sets ====
As of 22 March 2020, 17 6+4-car sets (H43-H59) are based at Toyoda Depot and formed with six motored ("M") cars and four non-powered trailer ("T") cars.

| | ← Tōkyō Ōtsuki, Ōme, Musashi-Itsukaichi, Komagawa → | | | | | | | | | |
| Car No. | 1 | 2 | 3 | 4 | 5 | 6 | 7 | 8 | 9 | 10 |
Sets with on-board toilet
| Designation | Tc | M | M' | M | M' | Tc' | Tc | M | M' | Tc' |
| Numbering | KuHa E233 | MoHa E233 | MoHa E232 | MoHa E233-800 | MoHa E232-200 | KuHa E232-500 | KuHa E233-500 | MoHa E233-600 | MoHa E232-600 | KuHa E232 |
| Capacity (total/seated) | 142/39 | 160/54 | | 155/48 | 160/54 | 142/42 | 142/42 | 160/54 | | 142/39 |
Sets without on-board toilet
| Designation | Tc | M | M' | M | M' | Tc' | Tc | M | M' | Tc' |
| Numbering | KuHa E233 | MoHa E233 | MoHa E232 | MoHa E233-200 | MoHa E232-200 | KuHa E232-500 | KuHa E233-500 | MoHa E233-600 | MoHa E232-600 | KuHa E232 |
| Capacity (total/seated) | 142/39 | 160/54 | | | | 142/42 | 142/42 | 160/54 | | 142/39 |

- Car 4 has one PS33D single-arm pantograph, and cars 2 and 8 each have two PS33D single-arm pantographs (one used as a backup).
- Cars 1 and 10 have a wheelchair space (also car 4 in sets equipped with a toilet).
- Car 4 has a universal design toilet (in sets equipped with a toilet).
- Car 4 is designated as a mildly air-conditioned car.

==== 6+4-car Ōme Line and Itsukaichi Line sets ====
As of 1 October 2018, ten six-car sets (Ao660-Ao669) and eight four-car (Ao460-Ao467) sets are based at Toyoda Depot and formed with six motored ("M") cars and four non-powered trailer ("T") cars. Depending on the specific schedule and line, trains are operated in 4-, 6-, or 6+4-car sets.

| | ← Tachikawa Musashi-Itsukaichi, Ōme → | | | | | | ← Tachikawa Okutama → | | | |
| Car No. | 1 | 2 | 3 | 4 | 5 | 6 | 7 | 8 | 9 | 10 |
| Designation | Tc | M | M' | M | M' | Tc' | Tc | M | M' | Tc' |
| Numbering | KuHa E233 | MoHa E233 | MoHa E232 | MoHa E233-200 | MoHa E232-200 | KuHa E232-500 | KuHa E233-500 | MoHa E233-600 | MoHa E232-600 | KuHa E232 |
| Capacity (total/seated) | 142/39 | 160/54 | | | | 142/42 | 142/42 | 160/54 | | 142/39 |

- Car 4 has one PS33D single-arm pantograph, and cars 2 and 8 each have two PS33D single-arm pantographs (one used as a backup).
- Cars 1 and 10 have a wheelchair space.
- Car 4 is designated as a mildly air-conditioned car.

== E233-1000 series ==
E233-1000 series
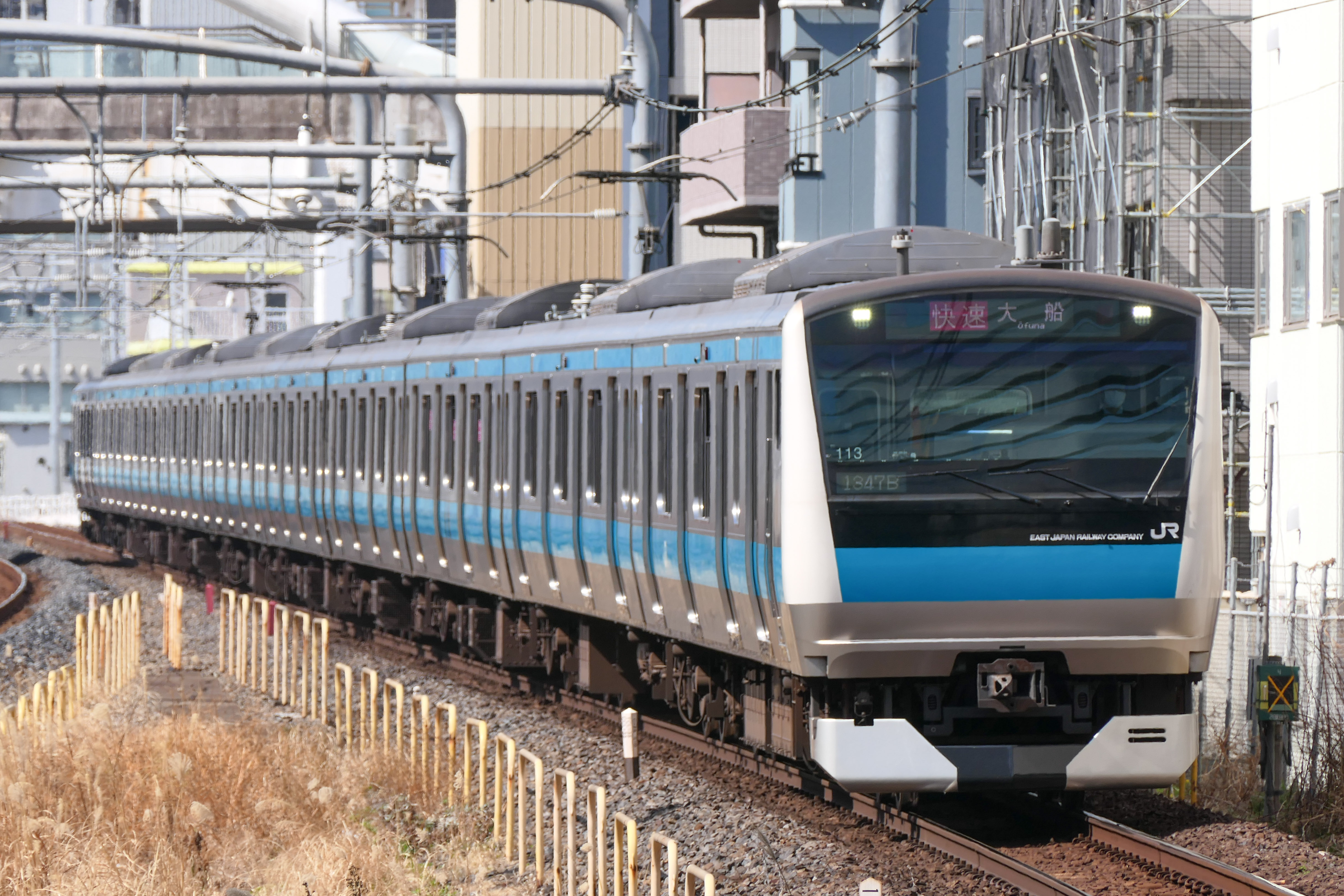
- Keihin–Tōhoku Line E233-1000 series set 113 in March 2021
- Manufacturers: JR East Niitsu, Kawasaki Heavy Industries, Tokyu Car
- Replaced: 209 series
- Constructed: 2007–2010
- Entered service: 22 December 2007
- Scrapped: 2016 (Accident Damage)
- Number built: 830 vehicles (83 sets)
- Number in service: 820 vehicles (82 sets)
- Number scrapped: 10 cars (accident damage)
- Formation: 10 cars per trainset
- Fleet numbers: 101–183
- Operator: JR East
- Depots: Saitama, Keiyō
- Lines served: Keihin–Tōhoku Line; Negishi Line; Keiyō Line; ■ Uchibō Line; ■ Sotobō Line

Specifications
- Car body construction: Stainless steel
- Car length: 20,000 mm (65 ft 7 in)
- Width: 2,950 mm (9 ft 8 in)
- Height: 3,620 mm (11 ft 11 in)
- Floor height: 1,130 mm (3 ft 8 in)
- Doors: 4 pairs per side
- Electric systems: 1,500 V DC overhead catenary
- Current collection: PS33D pantograph
- Bogies: DT71 (motor), TR255 (trailer)
- Track gauge: 1,067 mm (3 ft 6 in)

A fleet of 83 ten-car E233 series sets was introduced on the Keihin–Tōhoku and Negishi lines from autumn 2007, replacing the 209 series EMUs previously used from 1993 until 2010. The first set was delivered in August 2007. The main difference over the earlier E233-0 series is the absence of passenger door controls.

The first set entered service on 22 December 2007.

Two cars of set 177, KuHa E233-1077 and SaHa E233-1277, were involved in a derailment in February 2014 and were scrapped in December 2016. The remaining eight cars of set 177 were scrapped in April 2018.

Set 103 was transferred to the Keiyō Depot for use on the Keiyō, Uchibō and Sotobō lines in January 2026. That set began service on these services on 7 May 2026. While set 101 was transfered to Keiyō Depot in November 2026.

=== Interior ===
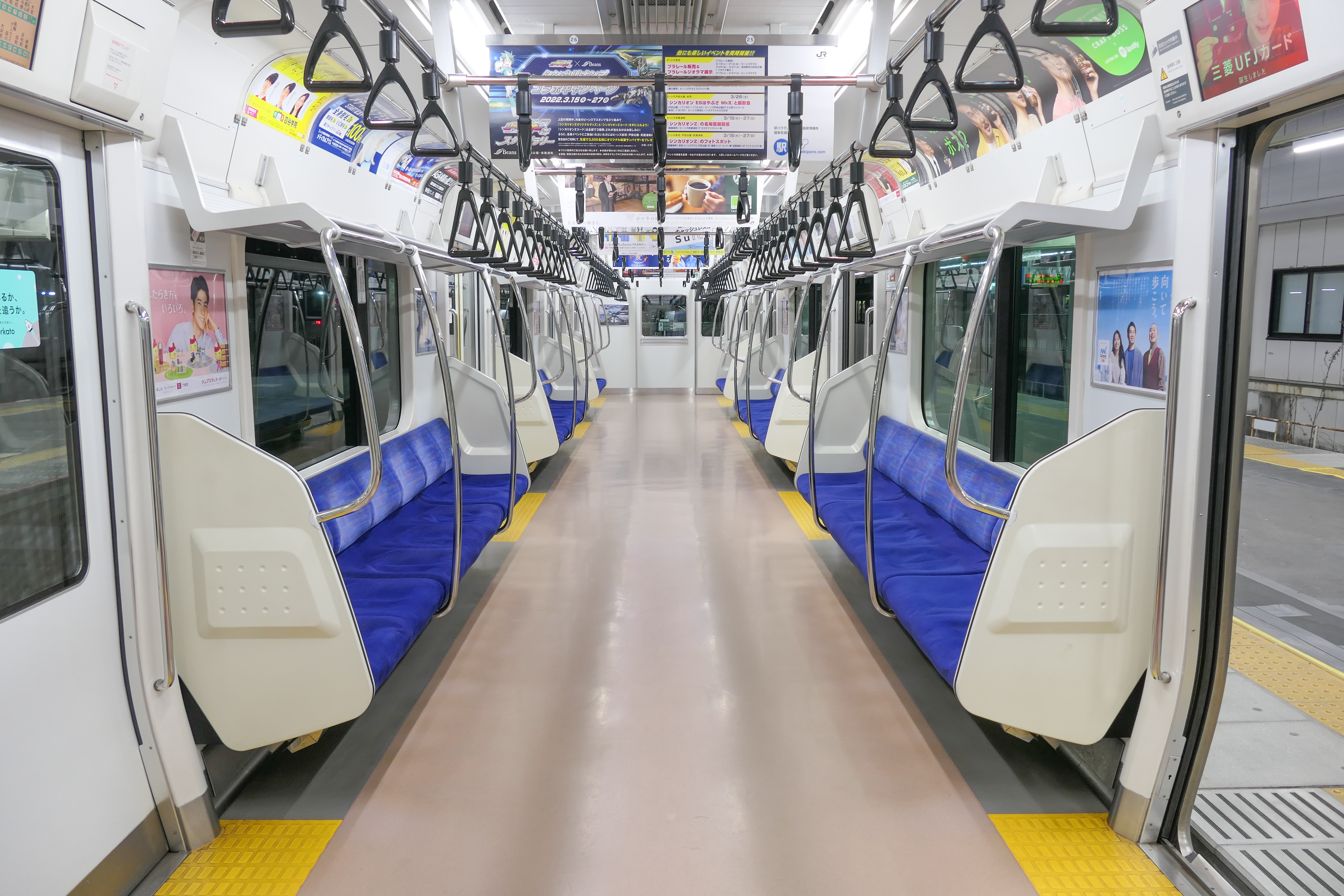
Interior of Keihin–Tōhoku Line E233-1000 series in March 2022

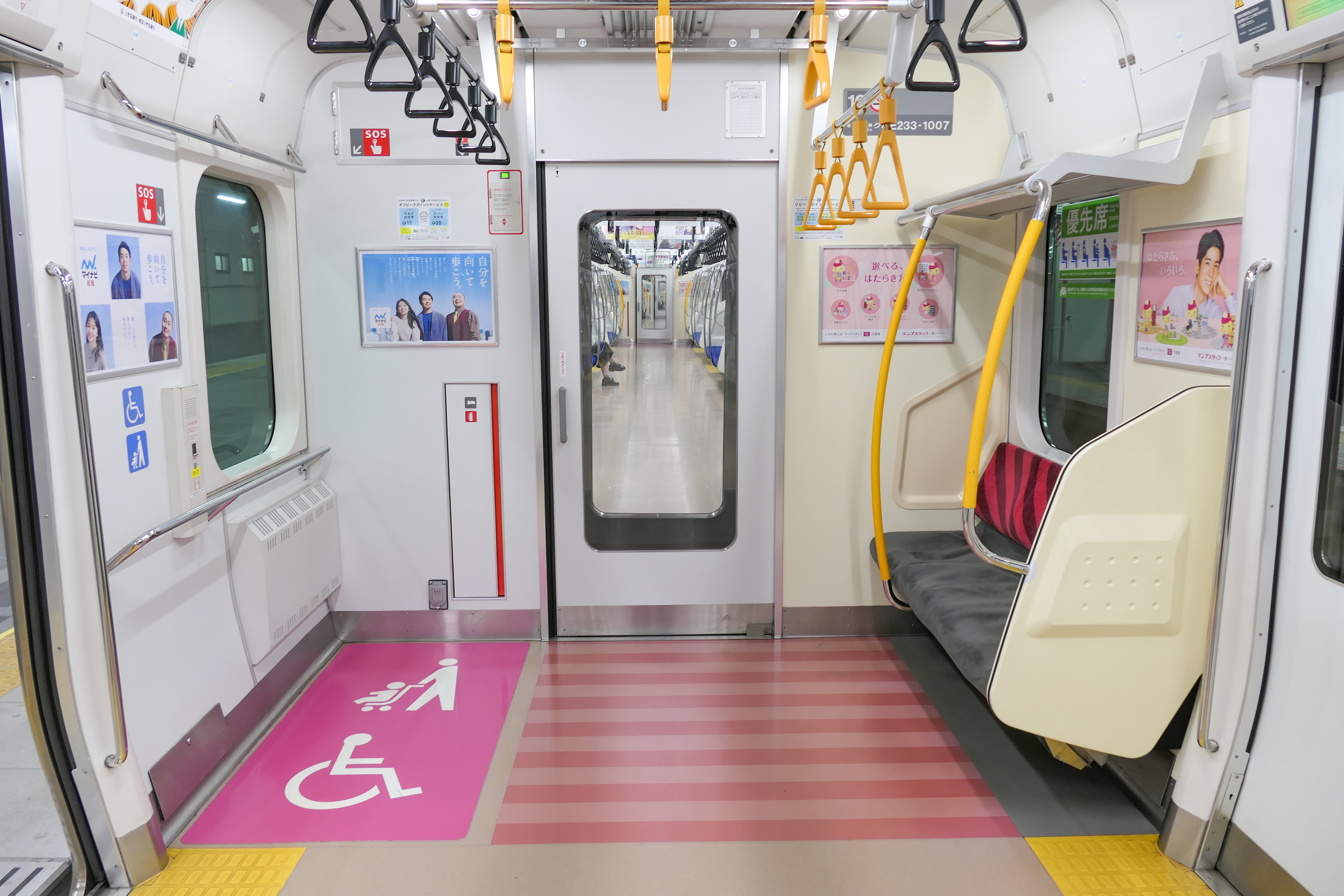
Priority seating in March 2022

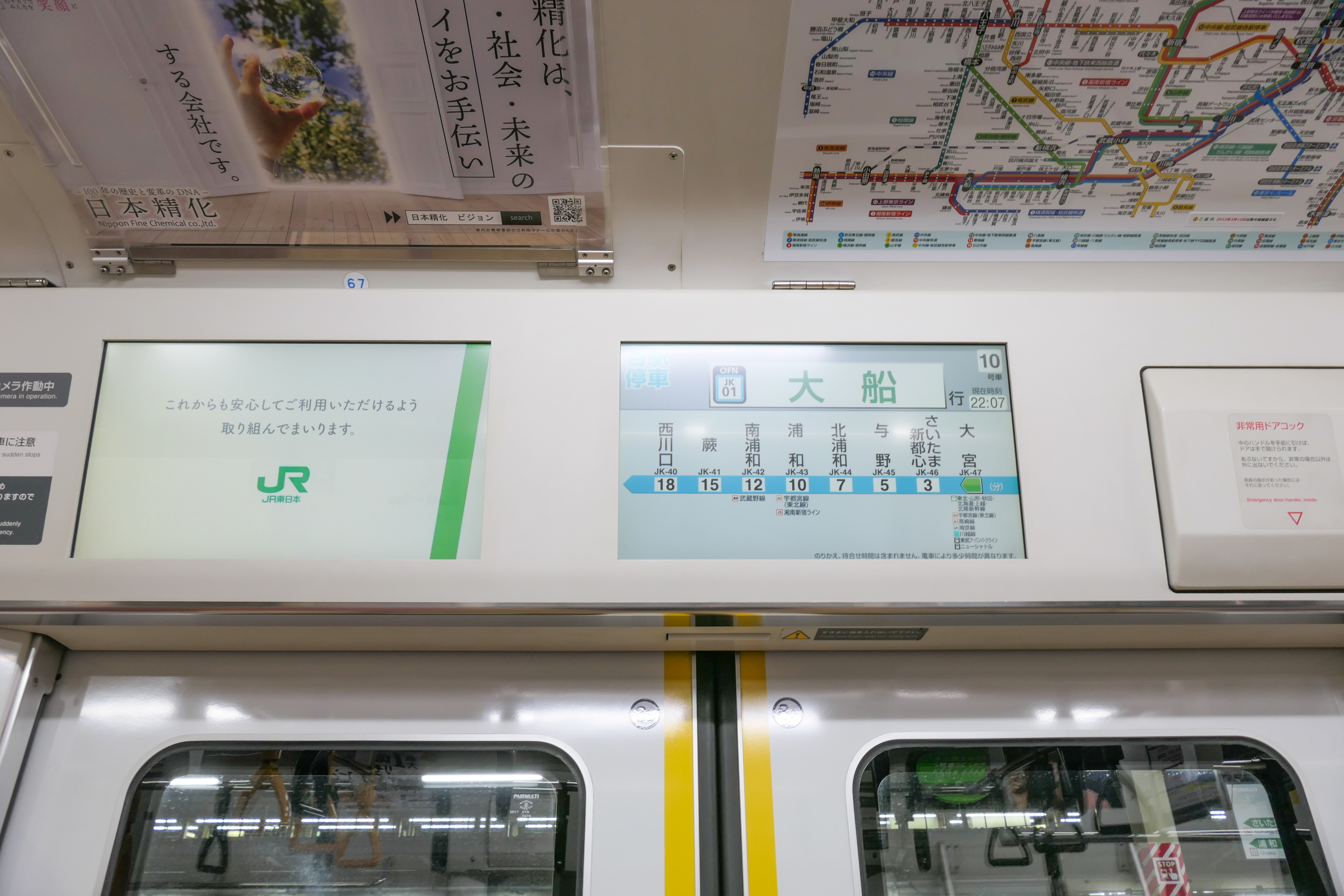
LCD passenger information display above door in March 2022

=== Formation ===
As of June 2026, 81 ten-car sets were based at Saitama depot and formed with six motored ("M") cars and four non-powered trailer ("T") cars.

| | ← Ōmiya Ōfuna → | | | | | | | | | |
| Car No. | 10 | 9 | 8 | 7 | 6 | 5 | 4 | 3 | 2 | 1 |
| Designation | Tc | T | M | M' | T | M | M' | M | M' | Tc' |
| Numbering | KuHa E233-1000 | SaHa E233-1200 | MoHa E233-1400 | MoHa E232-1400 | SaHa E233-1000 | MoHa E233-1000 | MoHa E232-1000 | MoHa E233-1200 | MoHa E232-1200 | KuHa E232-1000 |

Set 103 has been reconfigured to resemble the -5000 series, and is based at Keiyō Depot and formed with six motored ("M") cars and four non-powered trailer ("T") cars.

| | ← Kazusa-Minato, Kazusa-Ichinomiya, Kimitsu, Soga Tōkyō → | | | | | | | | | |
| Car No. | 10 | 9 | 8 | 7 | 6 | 5 | 4 | 3 | 2 | 1 |
| Designation | Tc | M | M' | T | T | M | M' | M | M' | Tc' |
| Numbering | KuHa E233-1003 | MoHa E233-1403 | MoHa E232-1403 | SaHa E233-1203 | SaHa E233-1003 | MoHa E233-1003 | MoHa E232-1003 | MoHa E233-1203 | MoHa E232-1203 | KuHa E232-1003 |

== E233-2000 series ==
E233-2000 series
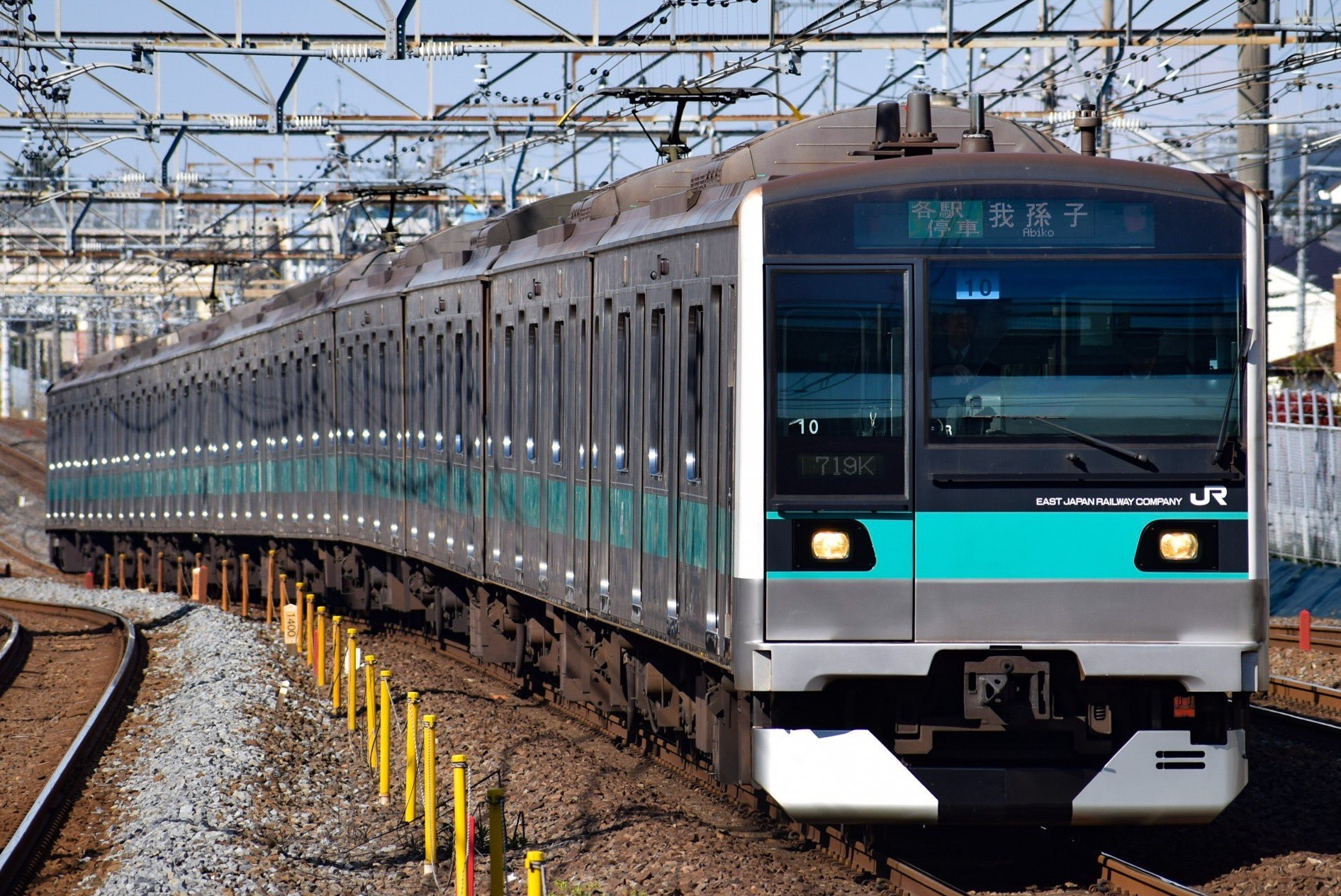
- Jōban Line/Tokyo Metro Chiyoda Line E233-2000 series set 10 in April 2019
- Manufacturers: Tokyu Car (sets 1-18); J-TREC (set 19)
- Built at: Yokohama
- Replaced: 203 series 207-900 series 209-1000 series
- Constructed: 2009–2011; 2017
- Entered service: 9 September 2009
- Number built: 190 vehicles (19 sets)
- Number in service: 190 vehicles (19 sets)
- Formation: 10 cars per trainset
- Fleet numbers: 1–19
- Operator: JR East
- Depot: Matsudo
- Lines served: Jōban Line (Local); Tokyo Metro Chiyoda Line; Odakyu Odawara Line; Odakyu Tama Line

Specifications
- Car body construction: Stainless steel
- Car length: 20,000 mm (65 ft 7 in)
- Width: 2,800 mm (9 ft 2 in)
- Doors: 4 pairs per side
- Electric systems: 1,500 V DC overhead catenary
- Current collection: Pantograph
- Track gauge: 1,067 mm (3 ft 6 in)

This is a narrow-bodied variant for Jōban Line and Tokyo Metro Chiyoda Line through services, replacing the 203 series and 207-900 series EMUs previously used. The first ten-car set was delivered to Matsudo Depot from Tokyu Car Corporation in May 2009. It entered service on 9 September 2009. These trains have also been used on through services on Odakyu lines since 2016. In 2017 the last set was delivered (set number 19 built by J-TREC). Like all trains running into the Tokyo Subway, these trains are fitted with emergency doors in the driver's cabin to allow for the evacuation of passengers in the Chiyoda Line's tunnels.

The floor height is lowered to 1,130 mm (44 in) for improved accessibility, compared to 1,200 mm (47 in) for the earlier 203 series and 1,180 mm (46 in) for the 207-900 series and 209-1000 series trains.

=== Interior ===
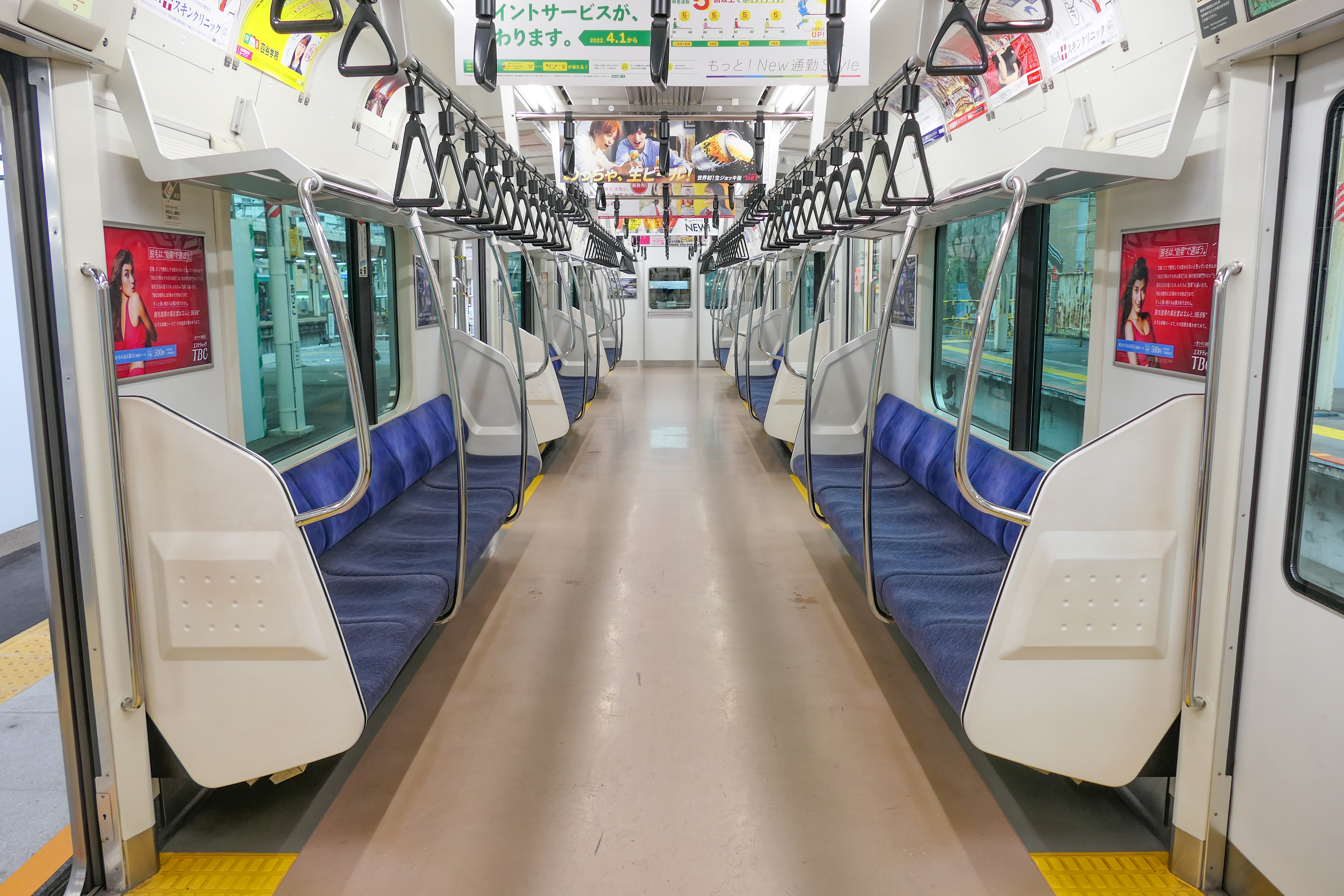
E233-2000 series interior in April 2022

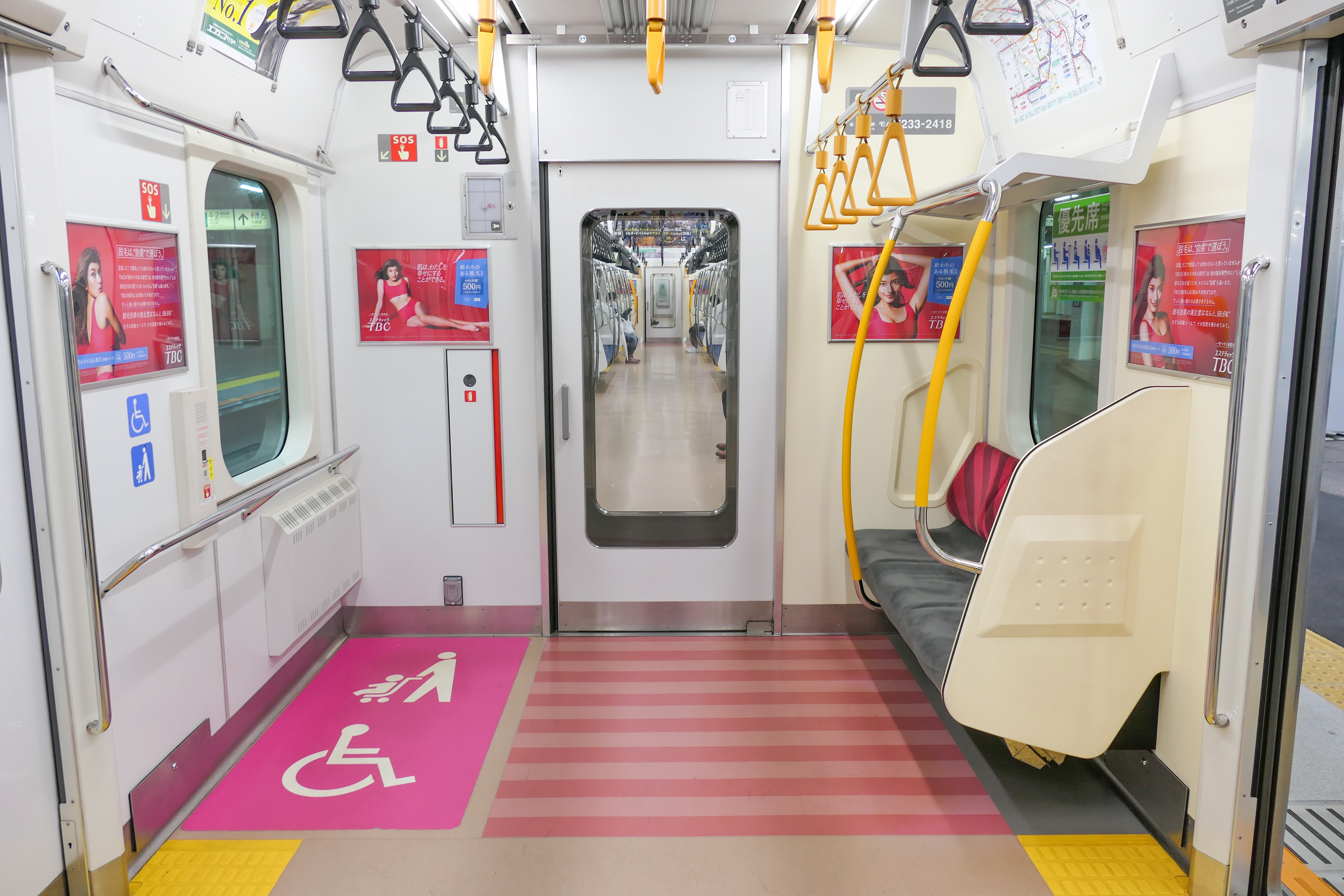
Priority seating in April 2022

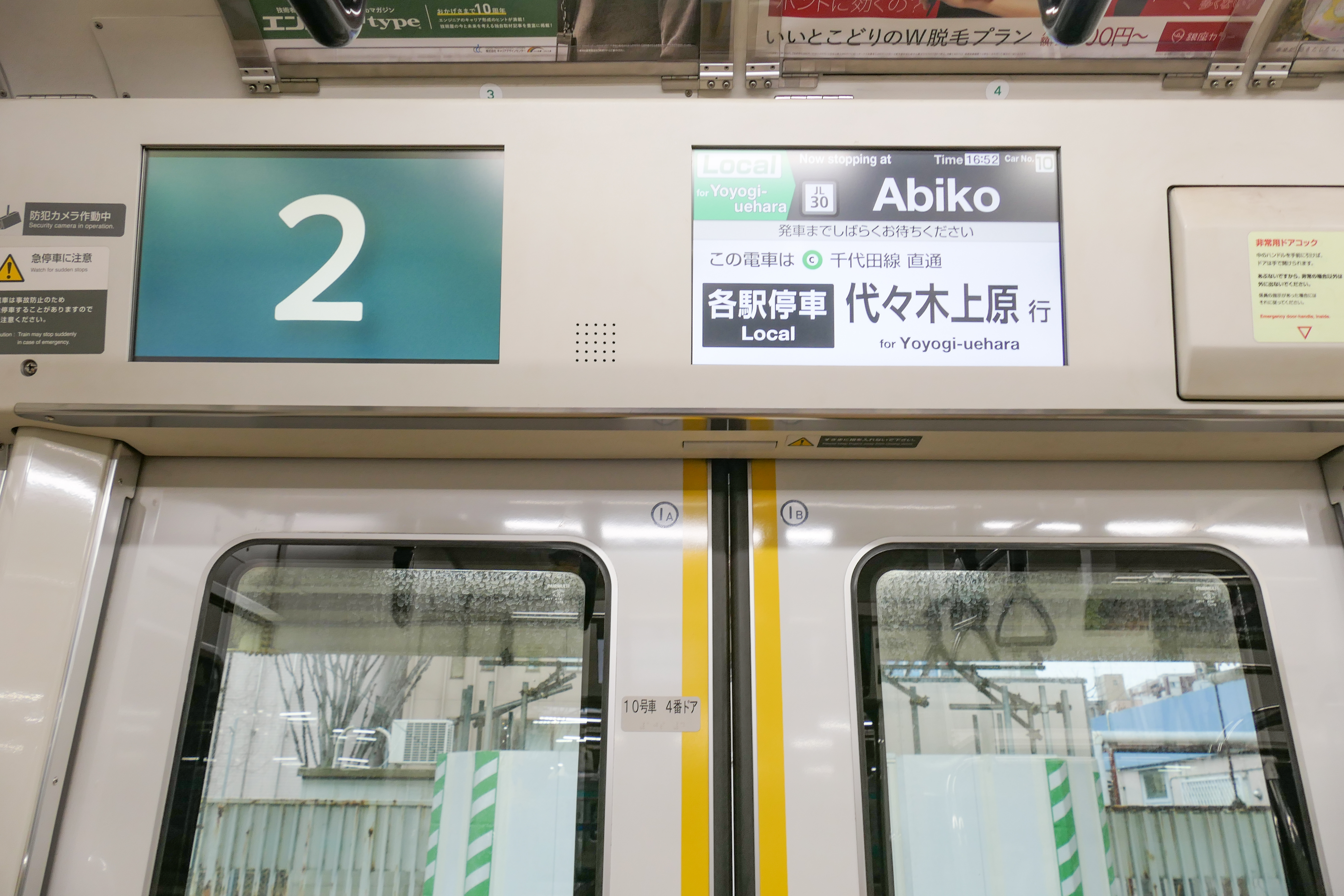
LCD passenger information display above door in April 2022

=== Formation ===
As of 1 April 2017, the fleet consists of 19 ten-car sets, numbered 1 to 19, based at Matsudo Depot, and formed as shown below, with car 1 at the southern end.

| | ← Toride, Ayase Yoyogi-Uehara → | | | | | | | | | |
| Car No. | 10 | 9 | 8 | 7 | 6 | 5 | 4 | 3 | 2 | 1 |
| Designation | Tc | M | M' | T | M | M' | T | M | M' | Tc' |
| Numbering | KuHa E233-2000 | MoHa E233-2400 | MoHa E232-2400 | SaHa E233-2200 | MoHa E233-2000 | MoHa E232-2000 | SaHa E233-2000 | MoHa E233-2200 | MoHa E232-2200 | KuHa E232-2000 |

Cars 3 and 9 are equipped with one single-arm pantograph. Car 6 is equipped with two.

=== Build details ===
The delivery dates for the fleet are as shown below.

| Set No. | Manufacturer | Date delivered |
|---|---|---|
| 1 | Tokyu Car | 20 May 2009 |
| 2 | Tokyu Car | 6 August 2010 |
| 3 | Tokyu Car | 1 September 2010 |
| 4 | Tokyu Car | 29 September 2010 |
| 5 | Tokyu Car | 3 December 2010 |
| 6 | Tokyu Car | 15 December 2010 |
| 7 | Tokyu Car | 22 December 2010 |
| 8 | Tokyu Car | 7 January 2011 |
| 9 | Tokyu Car | 19 January 2011 |
| 10 | Tokyu Car | 23 February 2011 |
| 11 | Tokyu Car | 4 March 2011 |
| 12 | Tokyu Car | 27 April 2011 |
| 13 | Tokyu Car | 10 July 2011 |
| 14 | Tokyu Car | 17 July 2011 |
| 15 | Tokyu Car | 30 July 2011 |
| 16 | Tokyu Car | 28 August 2011 |
| 17 | Tokyu Car | 19 September 2011 |
| 18 | Tokyu Car | 28 September 2011 |
| 19 | J-TREC (Yokohama) | 2017 |

== E233-3000 series ==
E233-3000 series
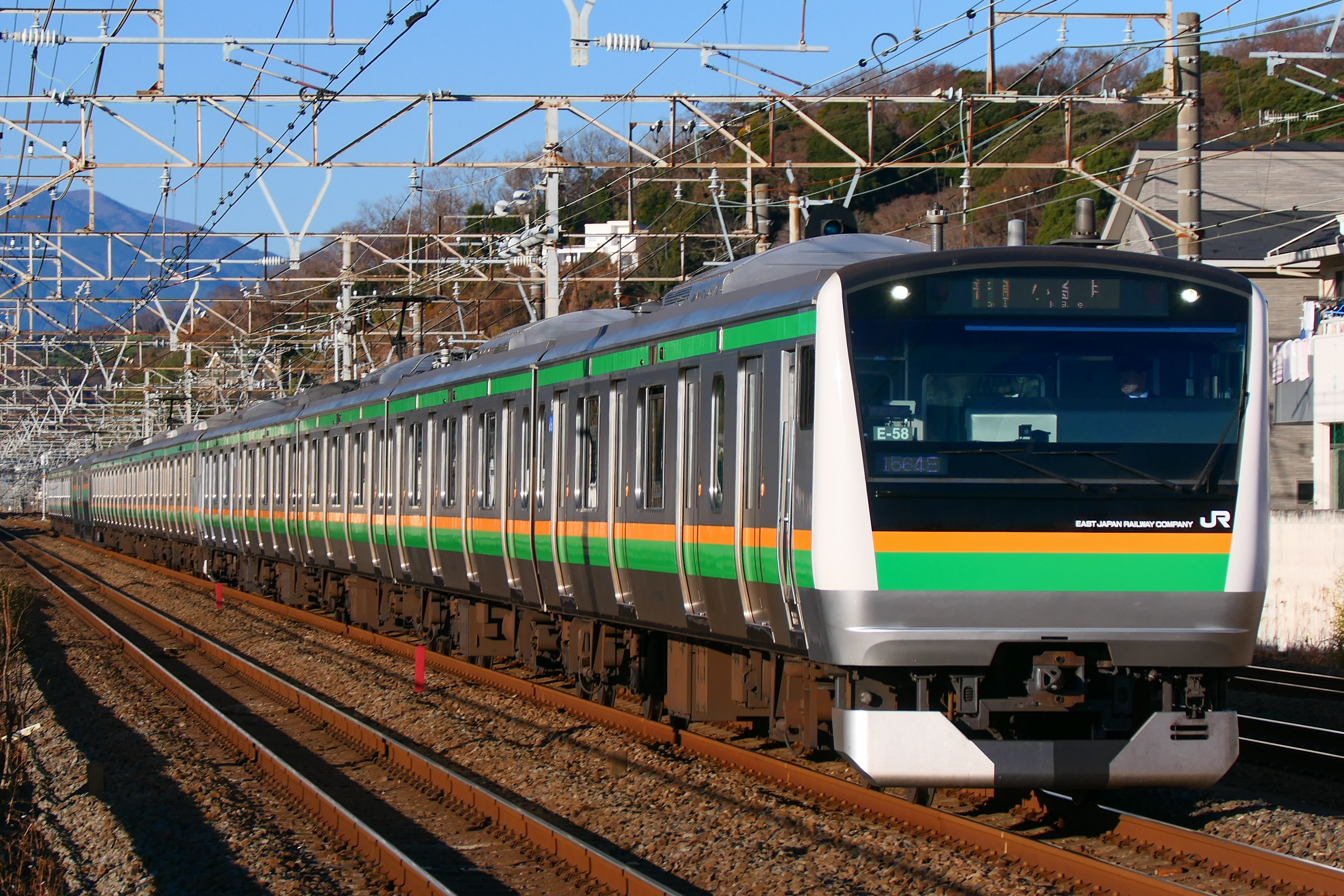
- E233-3000 series on the Tōkaidō Main Line in January 2023
- Manufacturers: JR East, Kawasaki Heavy Industries, Tokyu Car Corporation
- Replaced: 211 series
- Constructed: 2007, 2010–2015, 2017
- Entered service: 10 March 2008
- Number in service: 525 vehicles
- Formation: 5/10 cars per trainset
- Fleet numbers: E-01 to E-17, E-51 to E-67, E-71 to E-74, U618 to U633, U218 to U235
- Operator: JR East
- Depots: Kōzu, Oyama
- Lines served: Tōkaidō Main Line; Ito Line; Utsunomiya Line; Takasaki Line; Shōnan–Shinjuku Line; Yokosuka Line; ■ Joetsu Line; ■ Ryōmō Line; ■ Ueno-Tōkyō Line

Specifications
- Car body construction: Stainless steel
- Car length: 20,000 mm (65 ft 7 in)
- Width: 2,950 mm (9 ft 8 in)
- Doors: 4 pairs per side 2 doors per side (Green cars)
- Maximum speed: 120 km/h (75 mph)
- Acceleration: 2.5 km/(h⋅s) (1.6 mph/s)
- Electric system: 1,500 V DC overhead catenary
- Multiple working: E231-1000 series
- Track gauge: 1,067 mm (3 ft 6 in)

The E233-3000 sub-series are outer-suburban sets formed as ten-car sets containing two bilevel Green (first-class) cars and five-car sets. Sets are allocated to Kōzu and Oyama depots for use on Tōkaidō Main Line services between Tokyo and Numazu, as well as Shōnan–Shinjuku Line and Ueno–Tokyo Line through services to and from the Takasaki Line and Utsunomiya Line. The first sets entered service on 10 March 2008, and were introduced to the Shōnan–Shinjuku Line from the start of the new timetable on 14 March 2015.

=== Green car Exterior ===
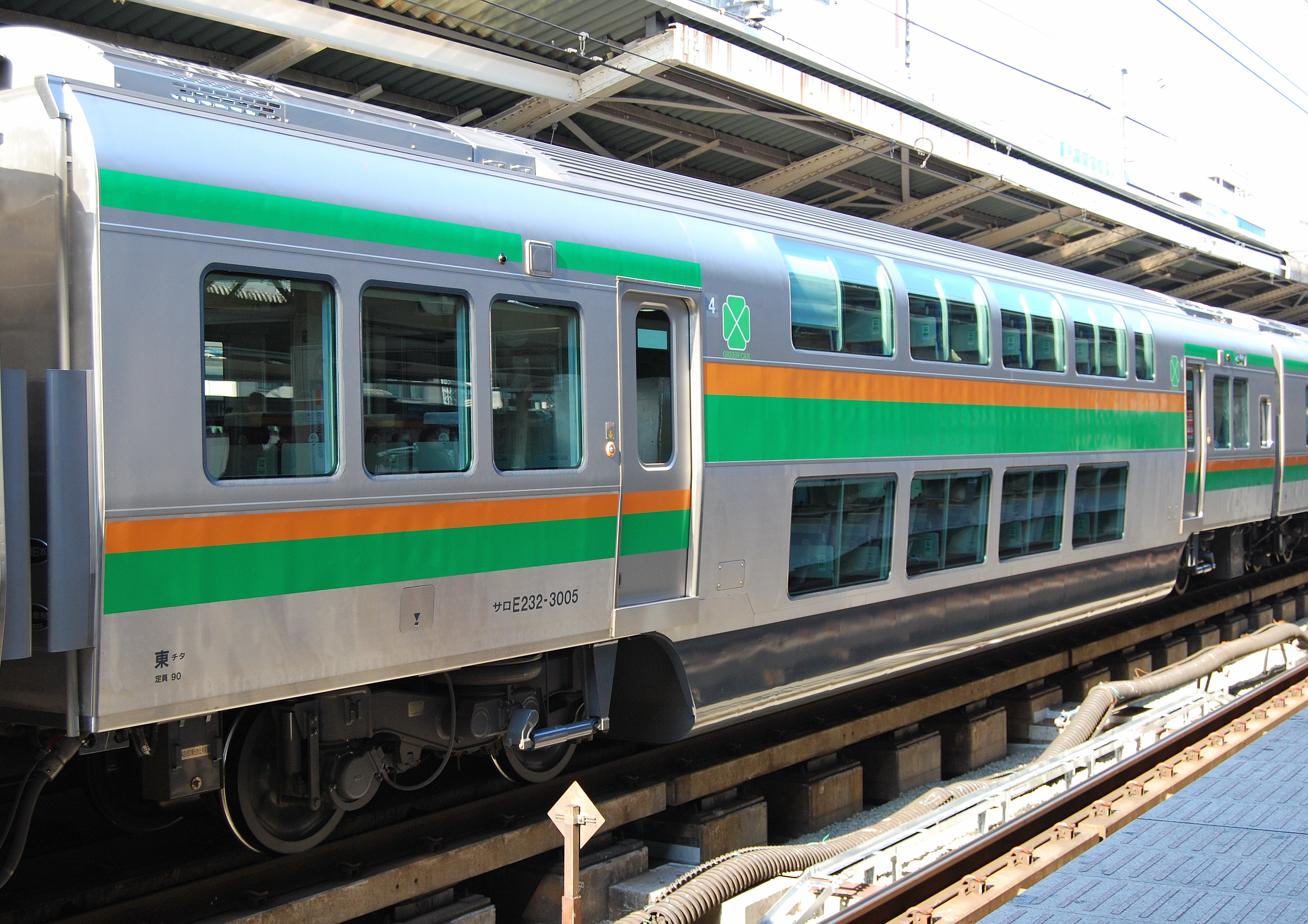
Bilevel Green car SaRo E232-3005 in January 2012

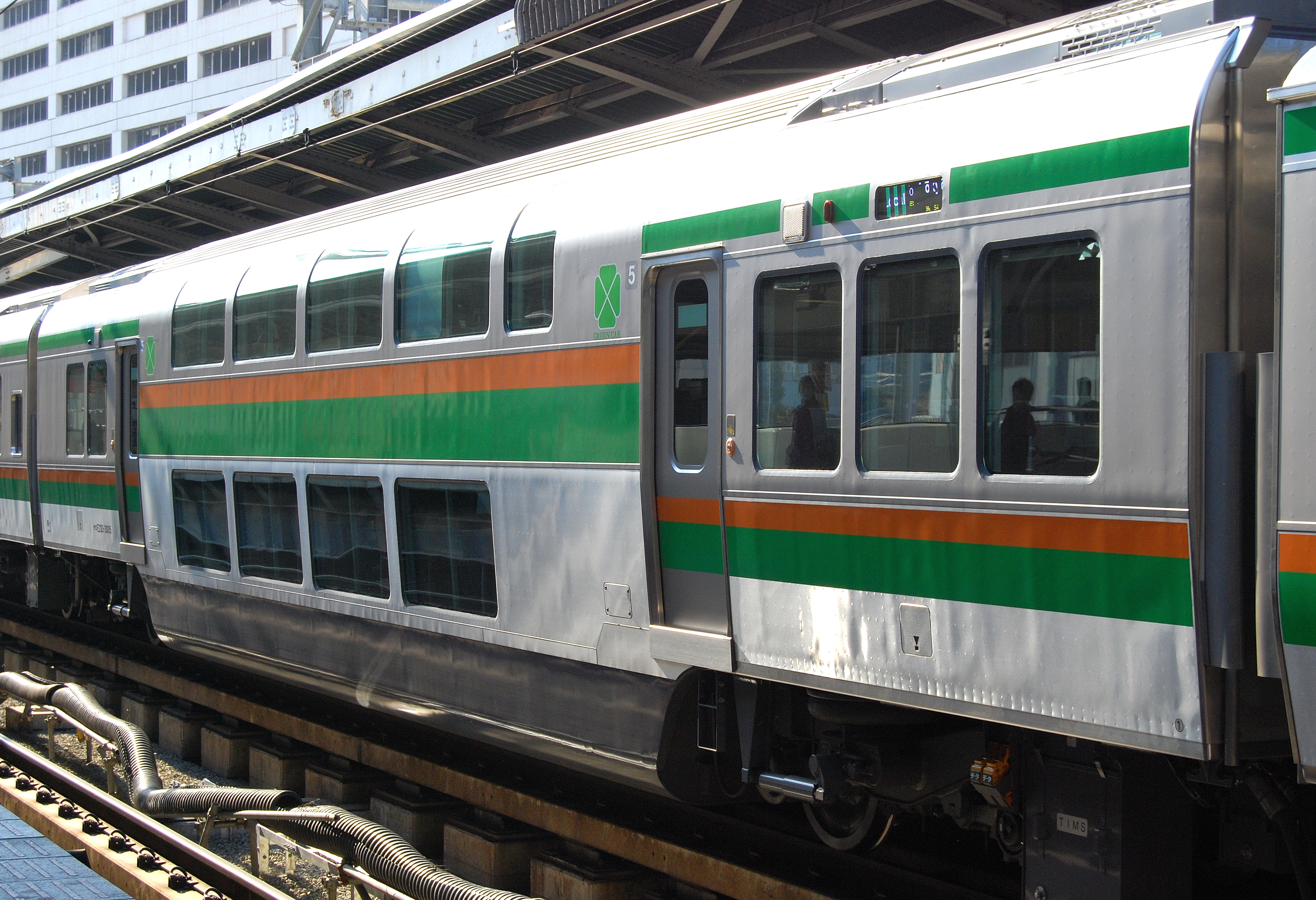
Bilevel Green car SaRo E233-3005 in January 2012

=== Formations ===
==== Early 10-car sets ====
As of 1 October 2018, 2 ten-car sets (E-01 and E-02) are based at Kōzu depot in Kanagawa Prefecture and formed as shown below with six motored ("M") cars and four non-powered trailer ("T") cars.

| | ← Kuroiso, Maebashi Zushi, Itō, Numazu → | | | | | | | | | |
| Car No. | 10 | 9 | 8 | 7 | 6 | 5 | 4 | 3 | 2 | 1 |
| Designation | Tc | M | M' | M | M' | Tsd | Tsd' | M | M' | Tc' |
| Numbering | KuHa E233-3000 | MoHa E233-3200 | MoHa E232-3200 | MoHa E233-3000 | MoHa E232-3000 | SaRo E233-3000 | SaRo E232-3000 | MoHa E233-3400 | MoHa E232-3400 | KuHa E232-3000 |
| Capacity (total/seated) | 135/40 | 161/60 | 160/54 | | | 90/90 | | 160/54 | 161/60 | 135/40 |

- Cars 3 and 9 each have one single-arm pantograph, and car 7 has two (one used as a backup).
- Cars 1 and 10 have a wheelchair space.
- Cars 1, 5, and 10 each have a toilet (universal design in cars 1 and 10).
- Car 8 is designated as a mildly air-conditioned car.
- Cars 4 and 5 are bilevel Green Cars.

==== Standard 10-car sets ====
As of 1 October 2018, 15 ten-car sets (E-03 to E-17) are based at Kōzu depot in Kanagawa Prefecture and 16 ten-car sets (U618 to U633) are based at Oyama depot in Tochigi Prefecture. They are formed as shown below with six motored ("M") cars and four non-powered trailer ("T") cars.

| | ← Kuroiso, Maebashi Zushi, Itō, Numazu → | | | | | | | | | |
| Car No. | 10 | 9 | 8 | 7 | 6 | 5 | 4 | 3 | 2 | 1 |
| Designation | Tc | M | M' | M | M' | Tsd | Tsd' | M | M' | Tc' |
| Numbering | KuHa E233-3000 | MoHa E233-3200 | MoHa E232-3000 | MoHa E233-3400 | MoHa E232-3800 | SaRo E233-3000 | SaRo E232-3000 | MoHa E233-3000 | MoHa E232-3400 | KuHa E232-3000 |
| Capacity (total/seated) | 135/40 | 161/60 | 160/54 | | 156/50 | 90/90 | | 160/54 | 161/60 | 135/40 |

- Cars 7 and 9 each have one single-arm pantograph, and car 3 has two (one used as a backup).
- Cars 1 and 10 have a wheelchair space.
- Cars 1, 5, 6, and 10 each have a toilet (universal design in cars 1 and 10).
- Car 8 is designated as a mildly air-conditioned car.
- Cars 4 and 5 are bilevel Green Cars.

==== 5-car sets ====
As of 1 October 2018, 21 five-car sets (E-51 to E-67, E-71 to E-74) are based at Kōzu depot in Kanagawa Prefecture and 18 five-car sets (U218 to U235) are based at Oyama depot in Tochigi Prefecture. They are formed as shown below with two motored ("M") cars and three non-powered trailer ("T") cars.

| | ← Kuroiso, Kagohara Zushi, Numazu → | | | | |
| Car No. | 15 | 14 | 13 | 12 | 11 |
| Designation | Tc | T | M | M' | Tc' |
| Numbering | KuHa E233-3500 | SaHa E233-3000 | MoHa E233-3600 | MoHa E232-3600 | KuHa E232-3500 |
| Capacity (total/seated) | 143/43 | 161/60 | 160/54 | | 135/36 |

- Car 13 has two single-arm pantographs (one used as a backup).
- Cars 11 and 15 have a wheelchair space.
- Car 11 has a universal design toilet.

=== Interior ===
Standard-class cars have longitudinal seating with dark blue moquette seat covers. Cars 1, 2, 9, 10, 14, and 15 include transverse four-person seating bays. The two Green (first class) bilevel cars (cars 4 and 5) have rotating, reclining seats arranged 2+2 abreast. Seats on the lower deck and end saloons have crimson moquette seat covers, and seats on the upper deck have dark blue moquette.

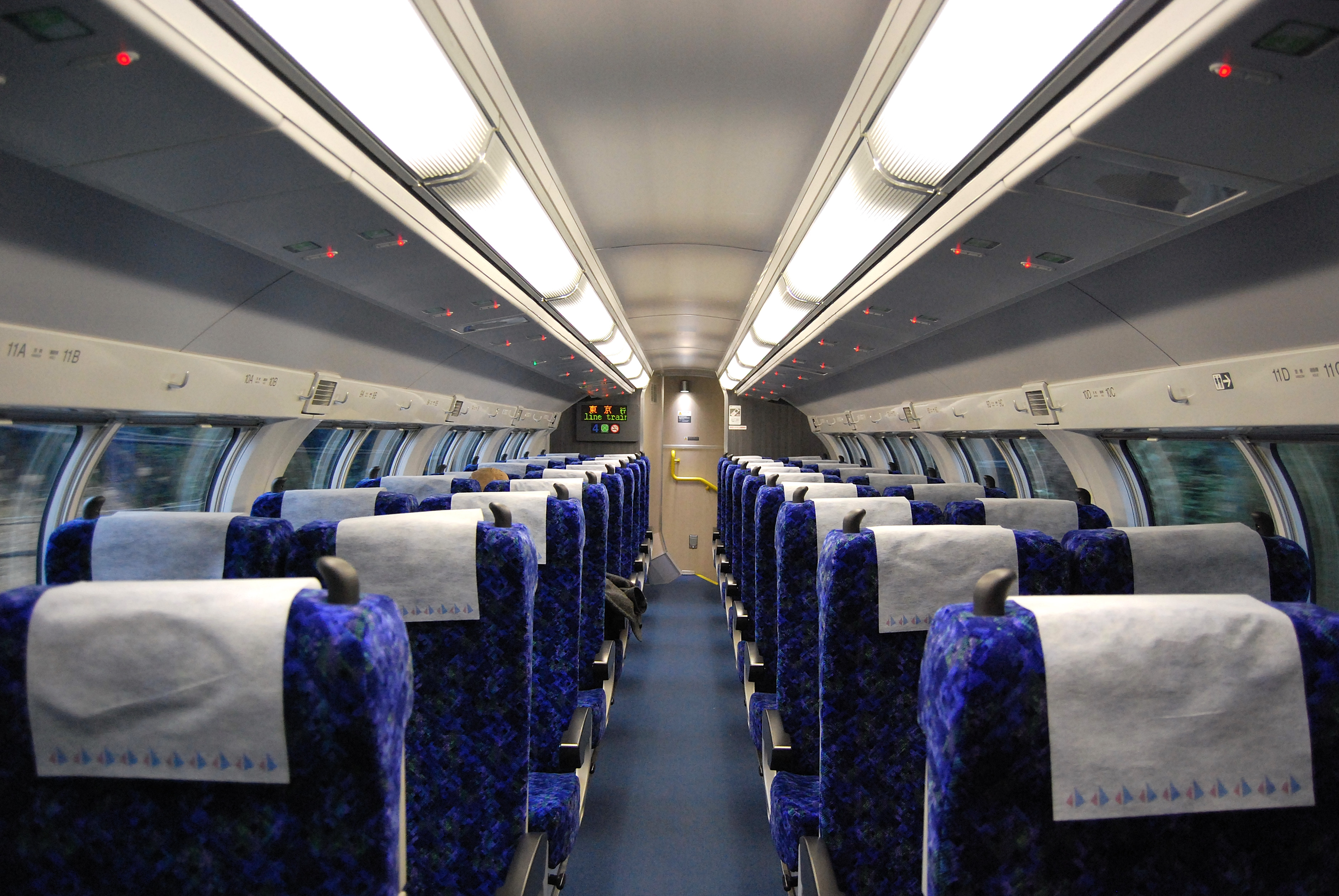
Upper deck of bilevel Green car in January 2012

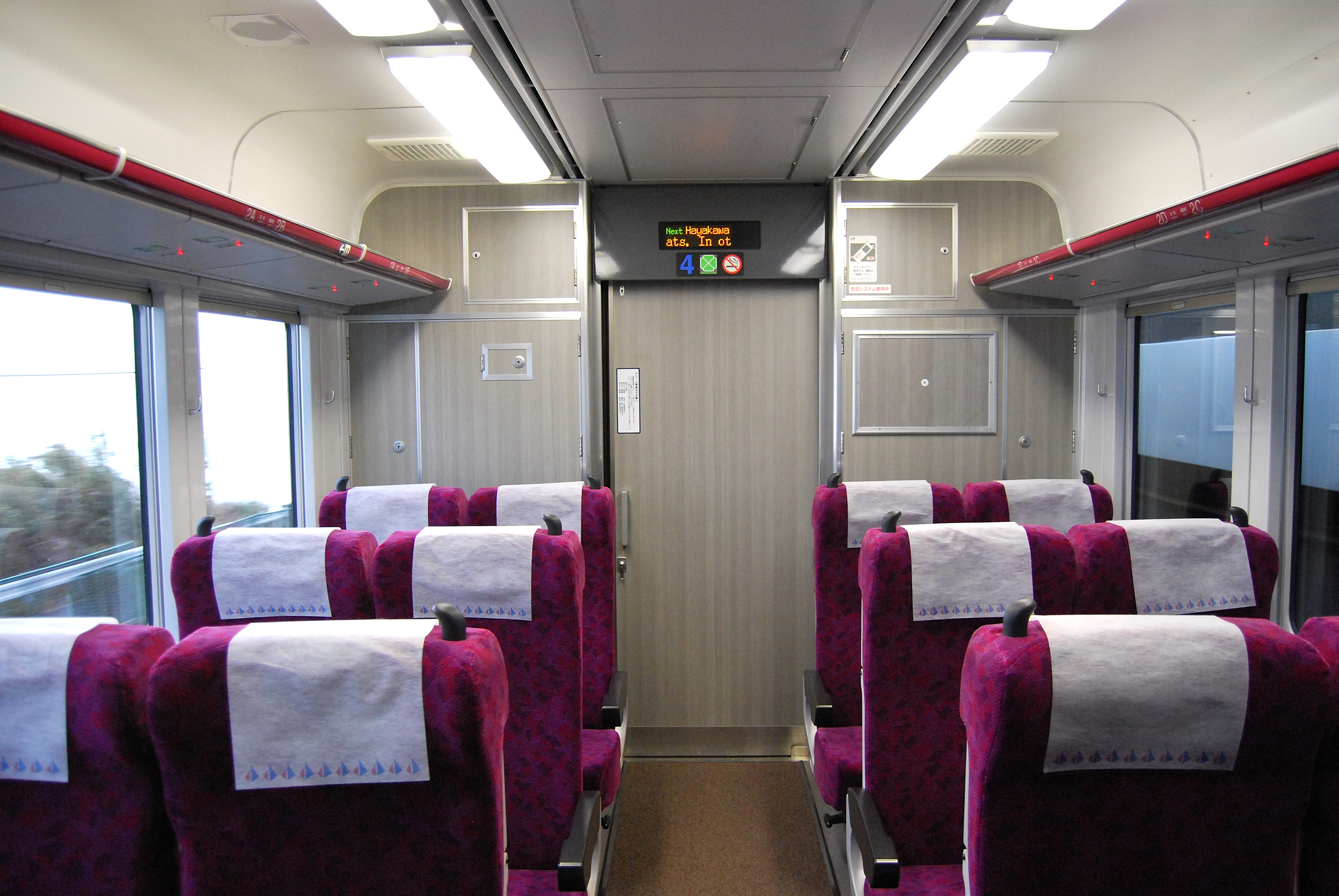
Intermediate level saloon at the end of a bilevel Green car in January 2012

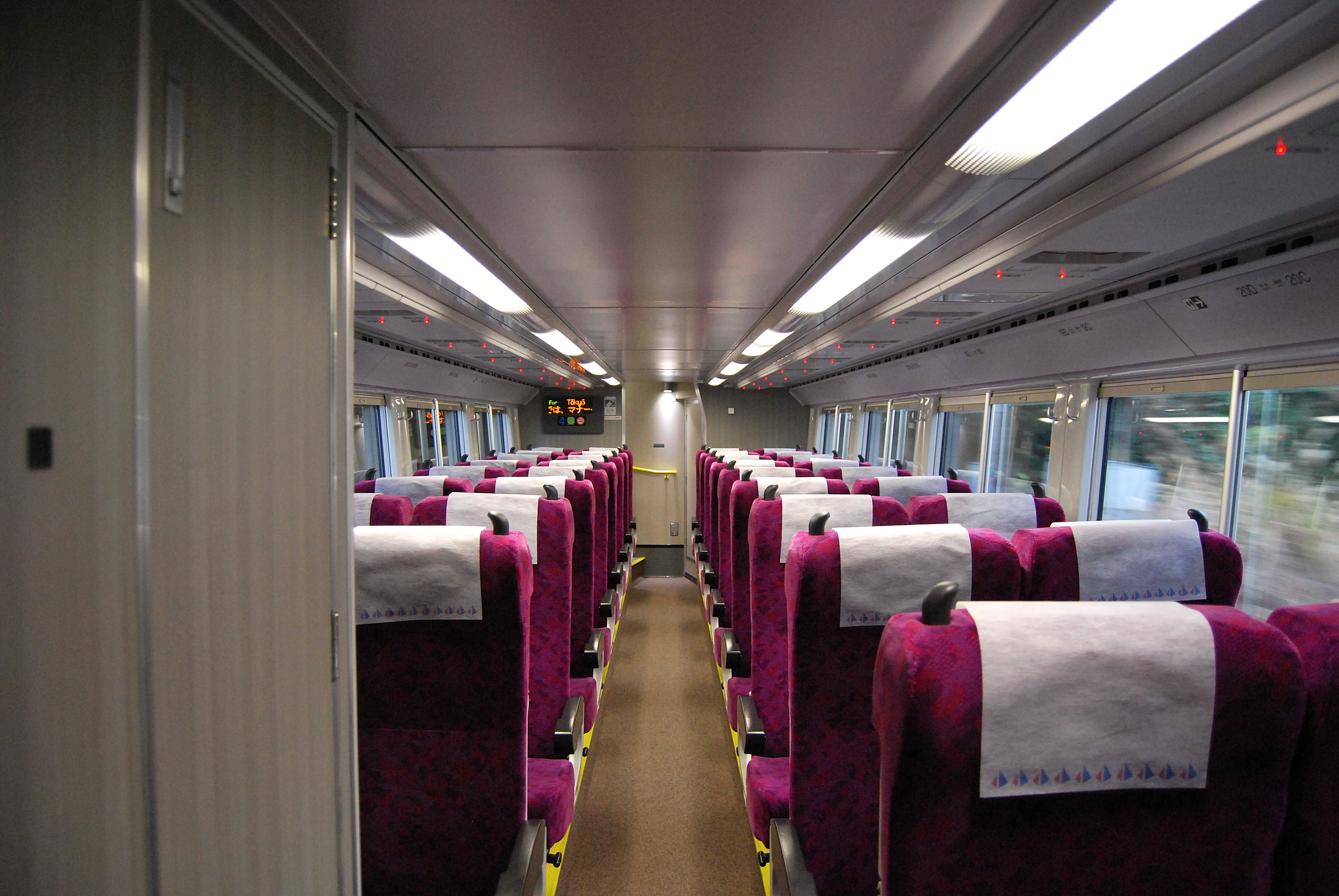
Lower deck of bilevel Green car in January 2012

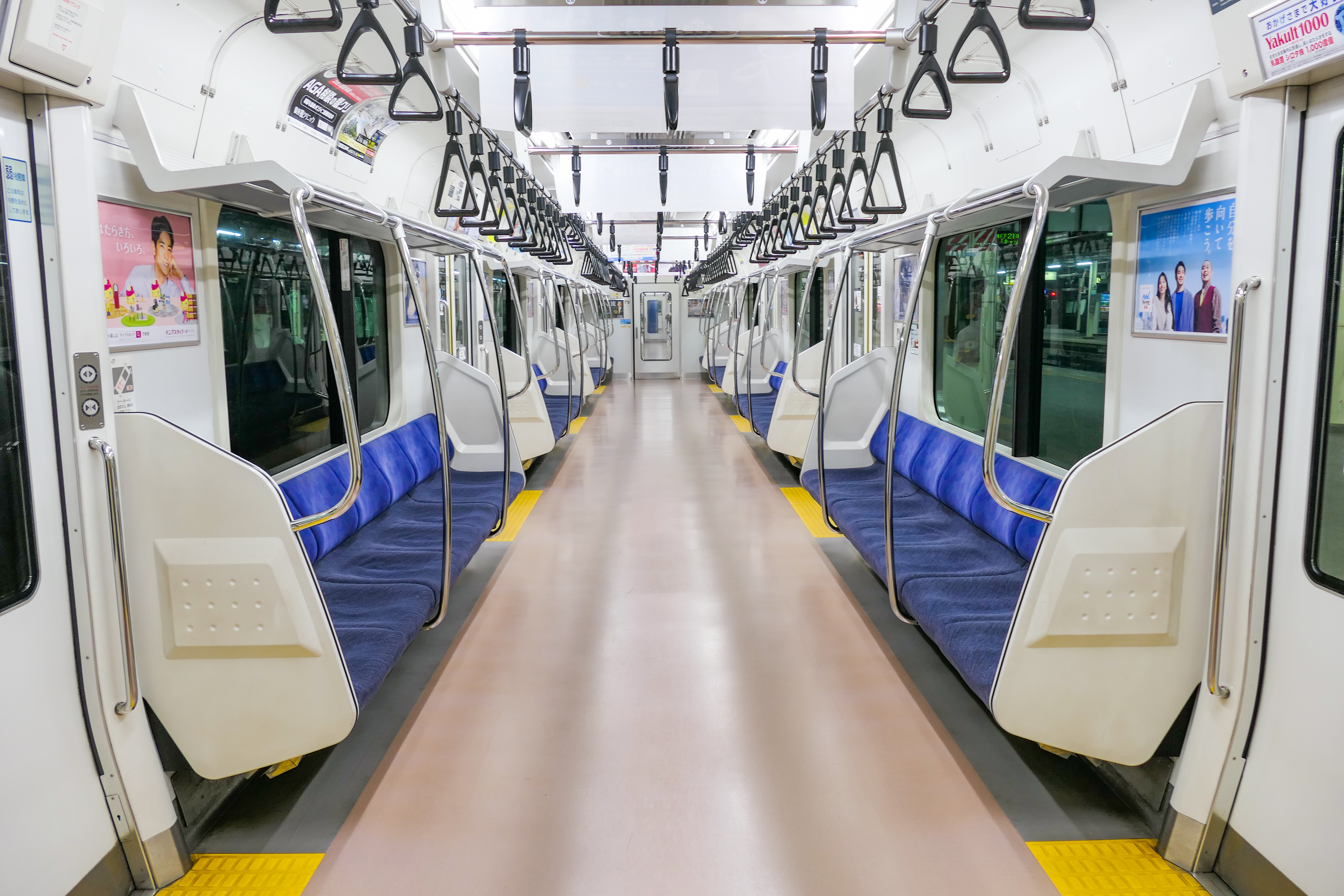
E233-3000 series longitudinal seating in March 2022

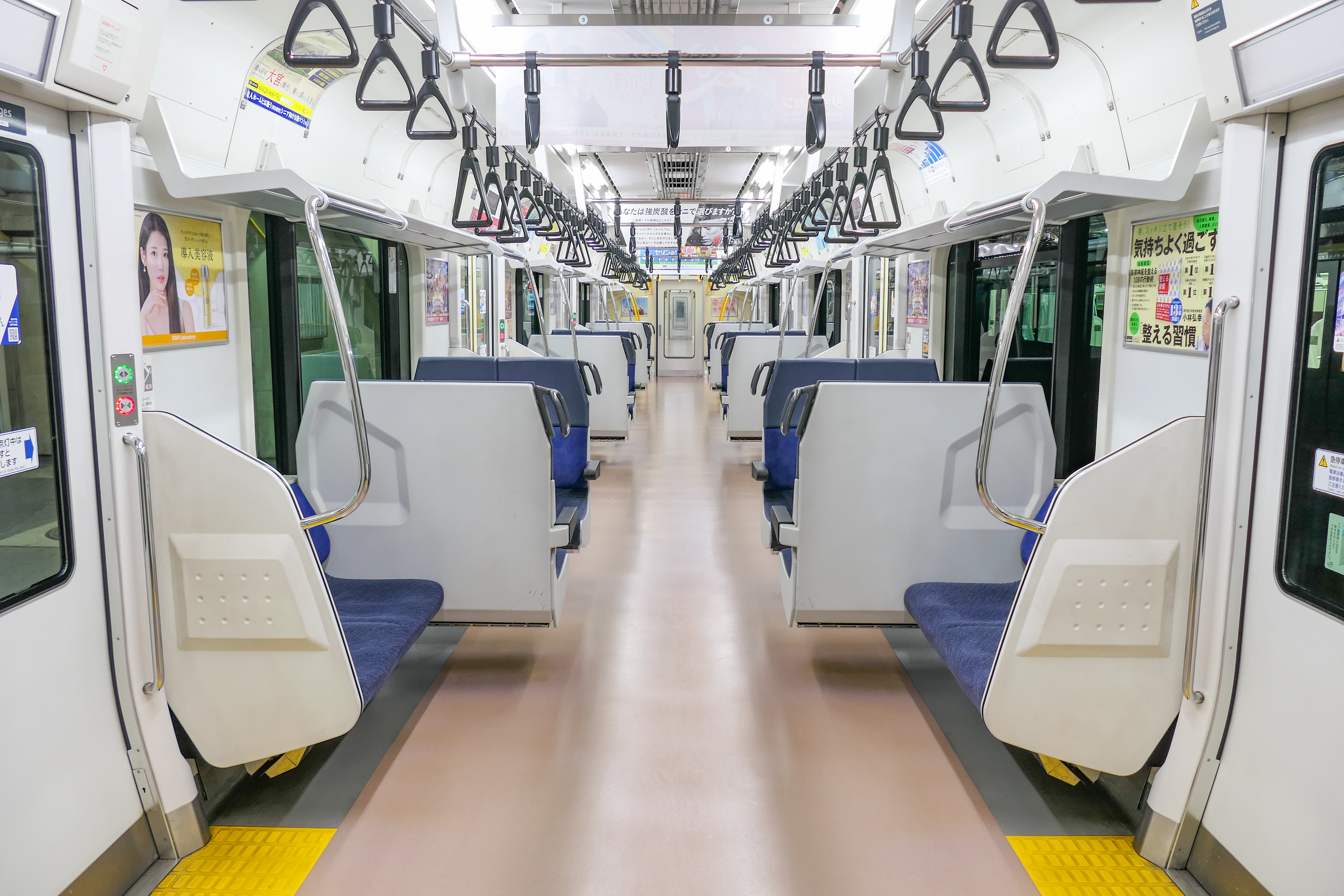
E233-3000 series transverse seating in March 2022

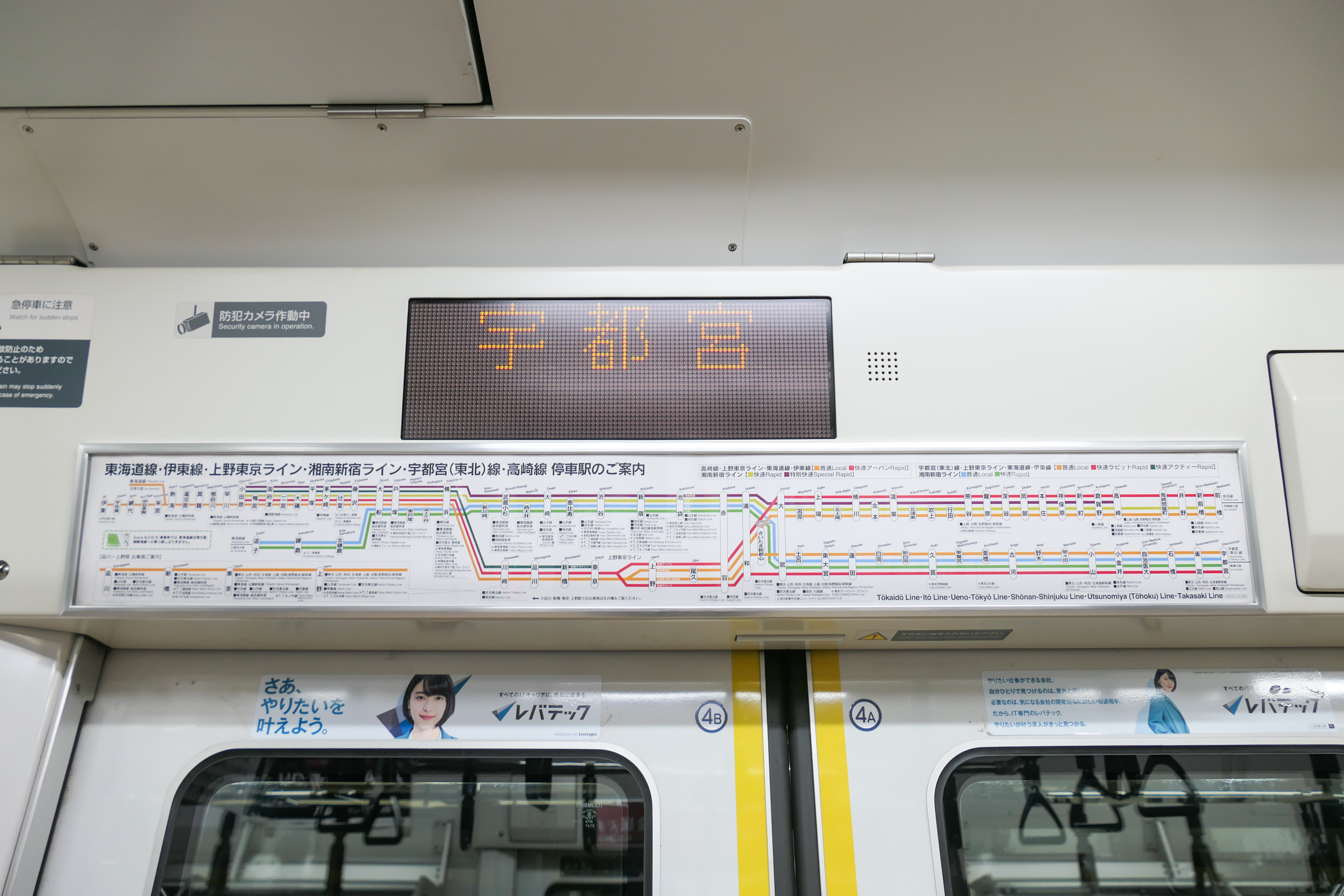
Internal passenger information LED screen in March 2022

The first 10+5-car E233-3000 series outer suburban set (E01 + E51) for use on the Tōkaidō Main Line was delivered from the Tokyu Car factory in Yokohama to Kōzu Depot in November 2007. This includes two bilevel Green cars. It entered revenue service on 10 March 2008, and was initially limited to use on the Tōkaidō Main Line between Tokyo and Atami. The second set (10+5-car set E02 + E52) was delivered in February 2010.

Subsequent sets (originally numbered NT1 + NT51 onward) were delivered to Tamachi Depot from September 2011, entering service from 12 November 2011. These sets incorporate a number of minor changes, including moving the second reserve pantograph from car 7 to car 3, and the addition of a toilet in car 6.

Takasaki-based ten- and five-car sets were introduced on Takasaki Line services between Ueno and Maebashi, replacing 211 series sets, and on Ryōmō Line services from 1 September 2012.

== E233-5000 series ==
E233-5000 series
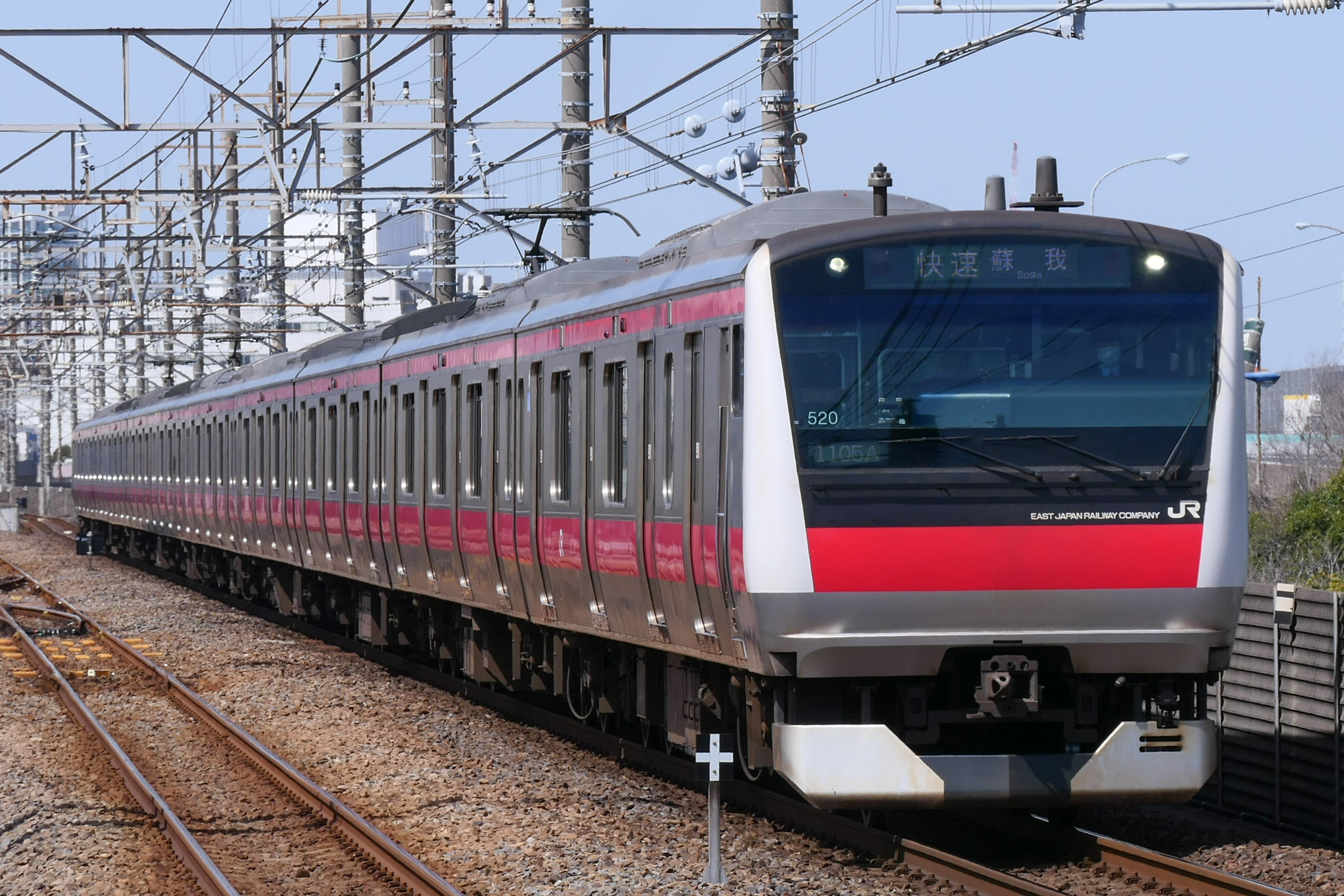
- A ten-car E233-5000 series Keiyō Line set in March 2021
- Manufacturer: JR East
- Built at: Niitsu
- Replaced: 201 series, 205 series, E331 series
- Constructed: 2010–2011
- Entered service: 1 July 2010
- Number built: 240 vehicles (28 sets)
- Number in service: 240 vehicles (28 sets)
- Formation: 4, 6, 10 cars per trainset
- Fleet numbers: 501–520, 551–554, F51–F54
- Operator: JR East
- Depot: Keiyō
- Lines served: Keiyō Line; ■ Uchibō Line; ■ Sotobō Line; ■ Tōgane Line

Specifications
- Car body construction: Stainless steel
- Car length: 20,000 mm (65 ft 7 in)
- Width: 2,950 mm (9 ft 8 in)
- Height: 3,620 mm (11 ft 11 in)
- Doors: 4 pairs per side
- Electric systems: 1,500 V DC overhead catenary
- Current collection: PS33D single-arm pantograph
- Track gauge: 1,067 mm (3 ft 6 in)

These are 10-car and 4+6-car sets for use on the Keiyō Line. The fleet consists of 20 ten-car sets and four 4+6-car sets, with the first sets entering revenue service on 1 July 2010, replacing the 201 series, 205 series, and E331 series EMUs previously used.

The first E233-5000 series set, set 501, was delivered from JR East's Niitsu factory on 10 March 2010. In addition to services on the Keiyō Line between Tokyo and Soga, these sets are also used on Sotobō Line through services between Soga and Kazusa-Ichinomiya, Uchibō Line through services between Soga and Kazusa-Minato, and on Tōgane Line through services between Ōami and Narutō.

In August 2026, set 553 (with a single-car set F53) was transferred to Makuhari depot, adding door buttons, and renumbered as set C9.

=== Formations ===
==== 10-car sets ====
As of 1 October 2018, 20 ten-car sets are based at Keiyō Depot and formed with six motored ("M") cars and four non-powered trailer ("T") cars.

| | ← Kazusa-Minato, Kazusa-Ichinomiya, Kimitsu, Soga Tōkyō → | | | | | | | | | |
| Car No. | 10 | 9 | 8 | 7 | 6 | 5 | 4 | 3 | 2 | 1 |
| Designation | Tc | M | M' | T | | M | M' | M | M' | Tc' |
| Numbering | KuHa E233-5000 | MoHa E233-5400 | MoHa E232-5400 | SaHa E233-5000 | SaHa E233-5500 | MoHa E233-5000 | MoHa E232-5000 | MoHa E233-5200 | MoHa E232-5200 | KuHa E232-5000 |
| Capacity (total/seated) | 142/39 | 160/54 | | | | | | | | 142/39 |

- Cars 3 and 9 each have one PS33D single-arm pantograph, and car 5 has two PS33D single-arm pantographs (one used as a backup).
- Cars 1 and 10 have a wheelchair space.
- Car 4 is designated as a mildly air-conditioned car.

==== 6+4-car sets ====
As of 1 October 2018, four 6+4-car sets are based at Keiyō Depot and formed with six motored ("M") cars and four non-powered trailer ("T") cars.

| | ← Katsuura, Narutō, Soga Tōkyō → | | | | | | | | | |
| Car No. | 10 | 9 | 8 | 7 | 6 | 5 | 4 | 3 | 2 | 1 |
| Designation | Tc | M | M' | Tc' | Tc | M | M' | M | M' | Tc' |
| Numbering | KuHa E233-5000 | MoHa E233-5600 | MoHa E232-5600 | KuHa E232-5500 | KuHa E233-5500 | MoHa E233-5000 | MoHa E232-5000 | MoHa E233-5200 | MoHa E232-5200 | KuHa E232-5000 |
| Capacity (total/seated) | 142/39 | 160/54 | | 142/42 | 142/42 | 160/54 | | | | 142/39 |

- Car 3 has one PS33D single-arm pantograph, and cars 5 and 9 each have two PS33D single-arm pantographs (one used as a backup).
- Cars 1 and 10 have a wheelchair space.
- Car 4 is designated as a mildly air-conditioned car.

=== Interior ===
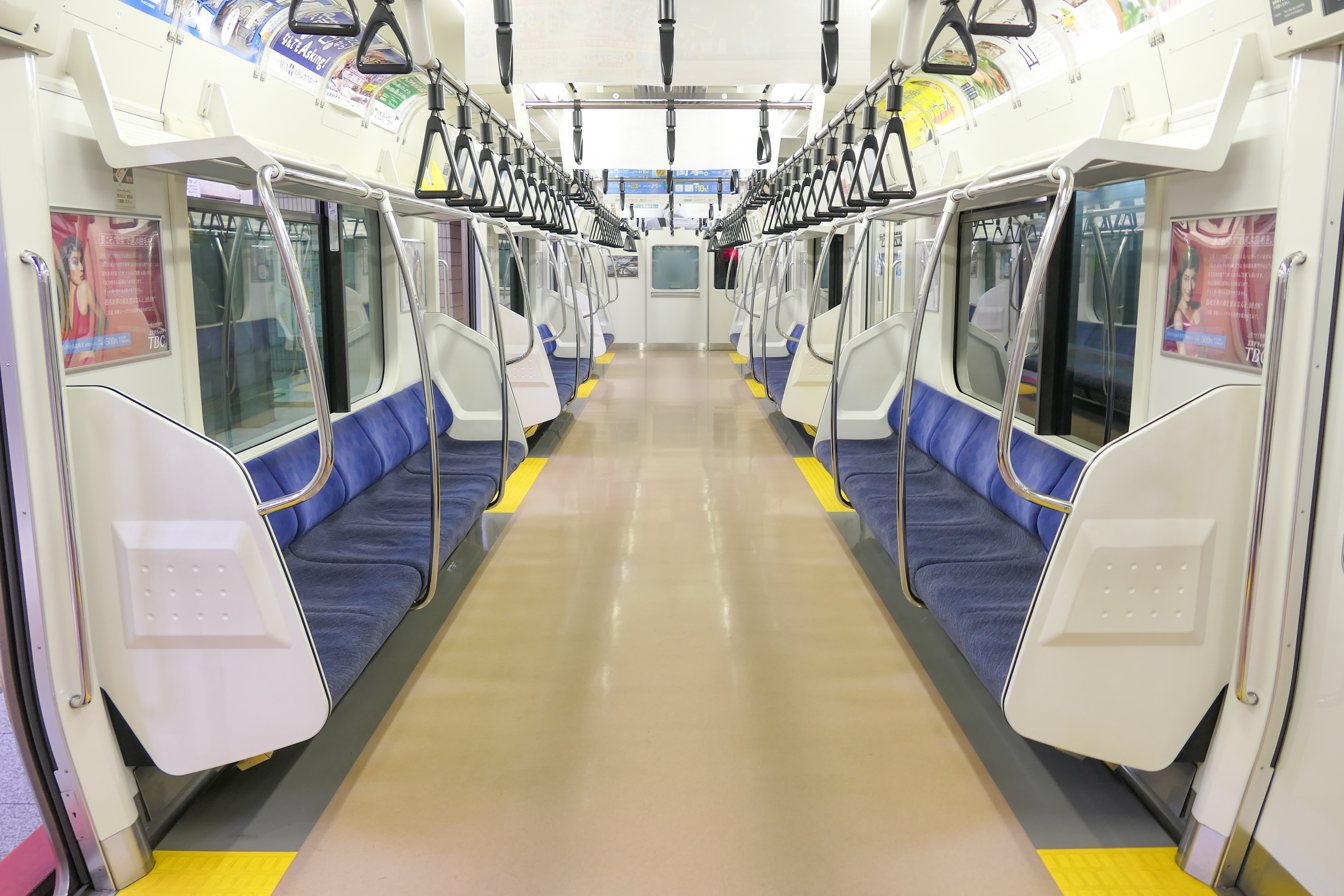
Interior view

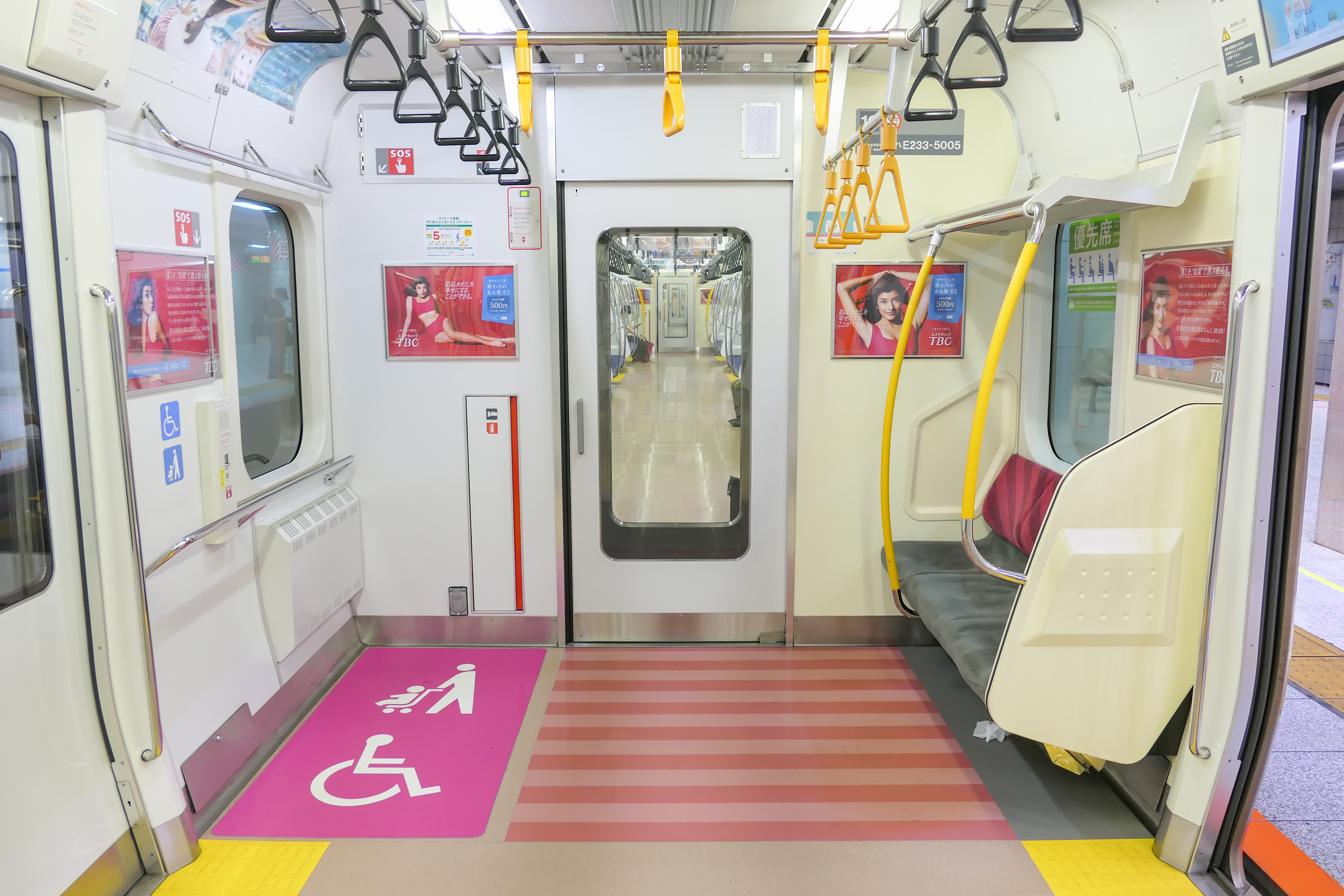
Priority seating

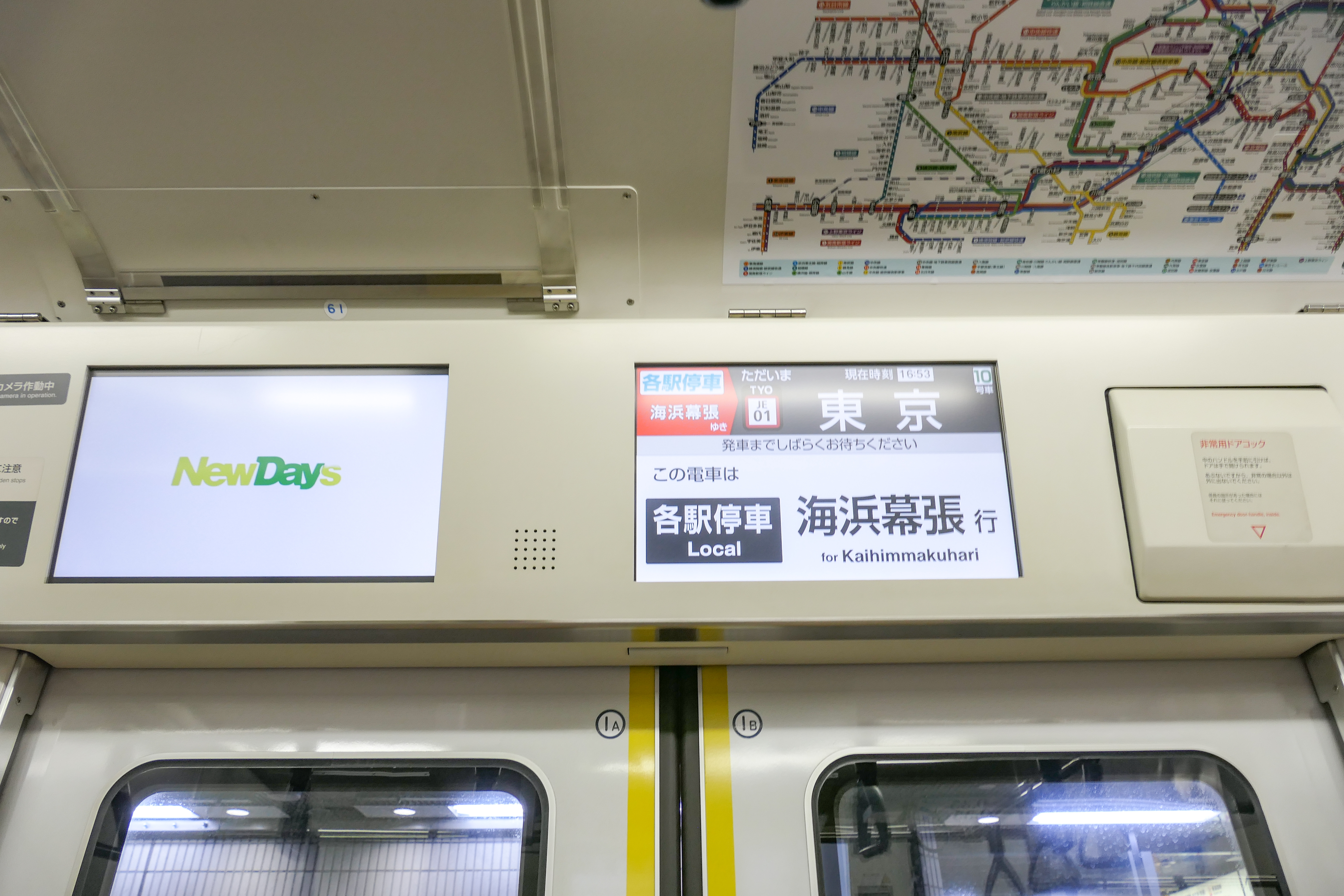
Passenger information screens

== E233-6000 series ==
E233-6000 series
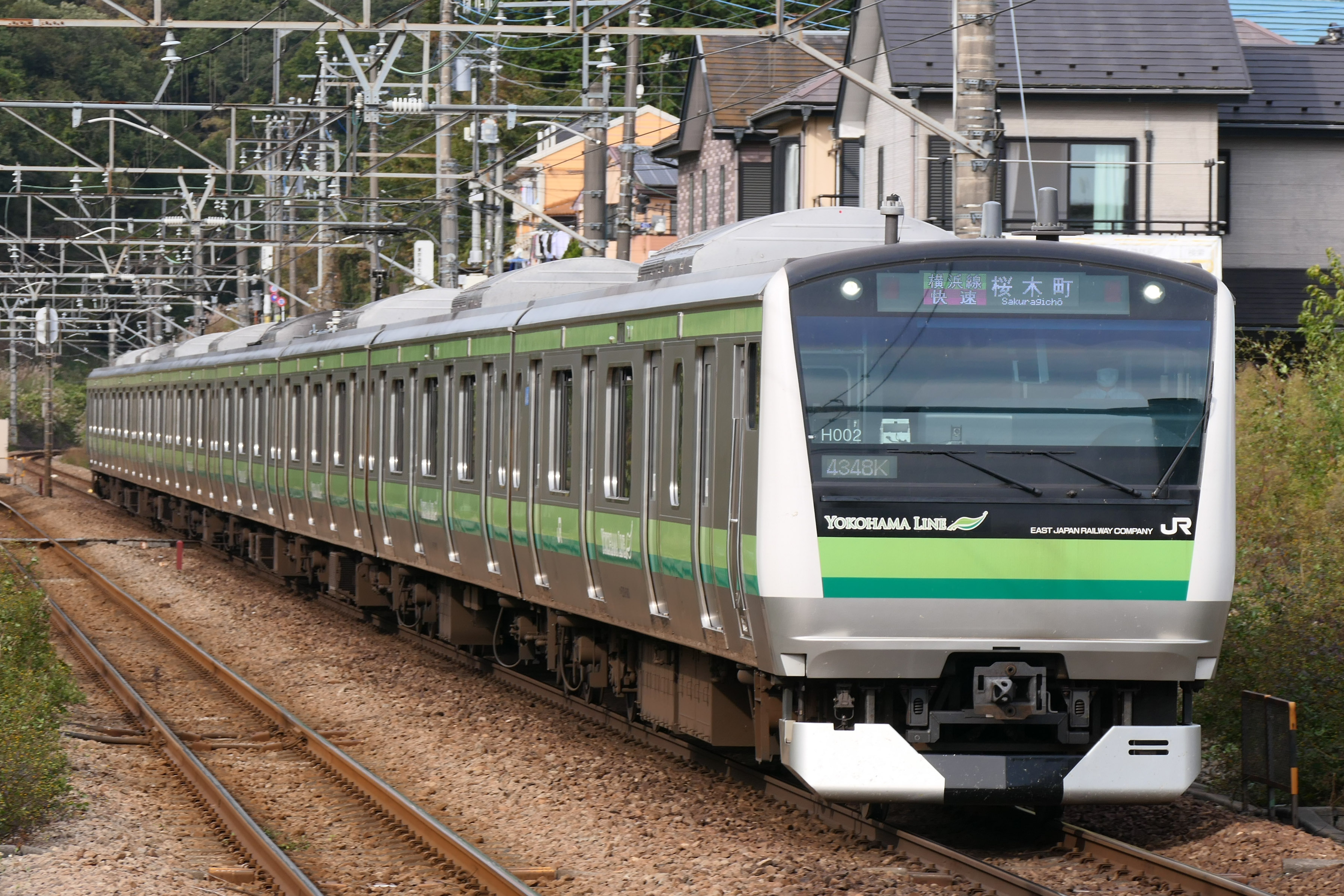
- Yokohama Line E233-6000 series set H002 in October 2020
- Manufacturer: J-TREC
- Built at: Niitsu, Yokohama
- Replaced: 205 series
- Constructed: 2013–2014
- Entered service: 16 February 2014
- Number built: 224 vehicles (28 sets)
- Number in service: 224 vehicles (28 sets)
- Formation: 8 cars per trainset
- Fleet numbers: H001–H028
- Operator: JR East
- Depot: Kamakura
- Lines served: Yokohama Line; Negishi Line

Specifications
- Car body construction: Stainless steel
- Car length: 20,000 mm (65 ft 7 in)
- Width: 2,950 mm (9 ft 8 in)
- Height: 3,620 mm (11 ft 11 in)
- Floor height: 1,130 mm (3 ft 8 in)
- Doors: 4 pairs per side
- Maximum speed: 95 km/h (59.0 mph) (service); 120 km/h (74.6 mph) (design)
- Electric system: 1,500 V DC overhead catenary
- Current collection: PS33D pantograph
- Bogies: DT71 (motor), TR255 (trailer)
- Safety systems: D-ATC, ATS-P
- Track gauge: 1,067 mm (3 ft 6 in)

These are eight-car sets operated in the Yokohama Line since 16 February 2014. As with the earlier Saikyo Line E233-7000 series variant, the trains use LED interior lighting.

A total of 28 sets were delivered. The first E233-6000 series set, H016, was delivered from the J-TREC Yokohama factory in January 2014. The first set built at the J-TREC Niitsu factory, set H001, was delivered on 22 January 2014.

=== Interior ===
Passenger accommodation consists of longitudinal bench seating with individual seat widths of 460 mm (18 in). Each car has priority seating at one end, and cars 1 and 8 have a wheelchair space.

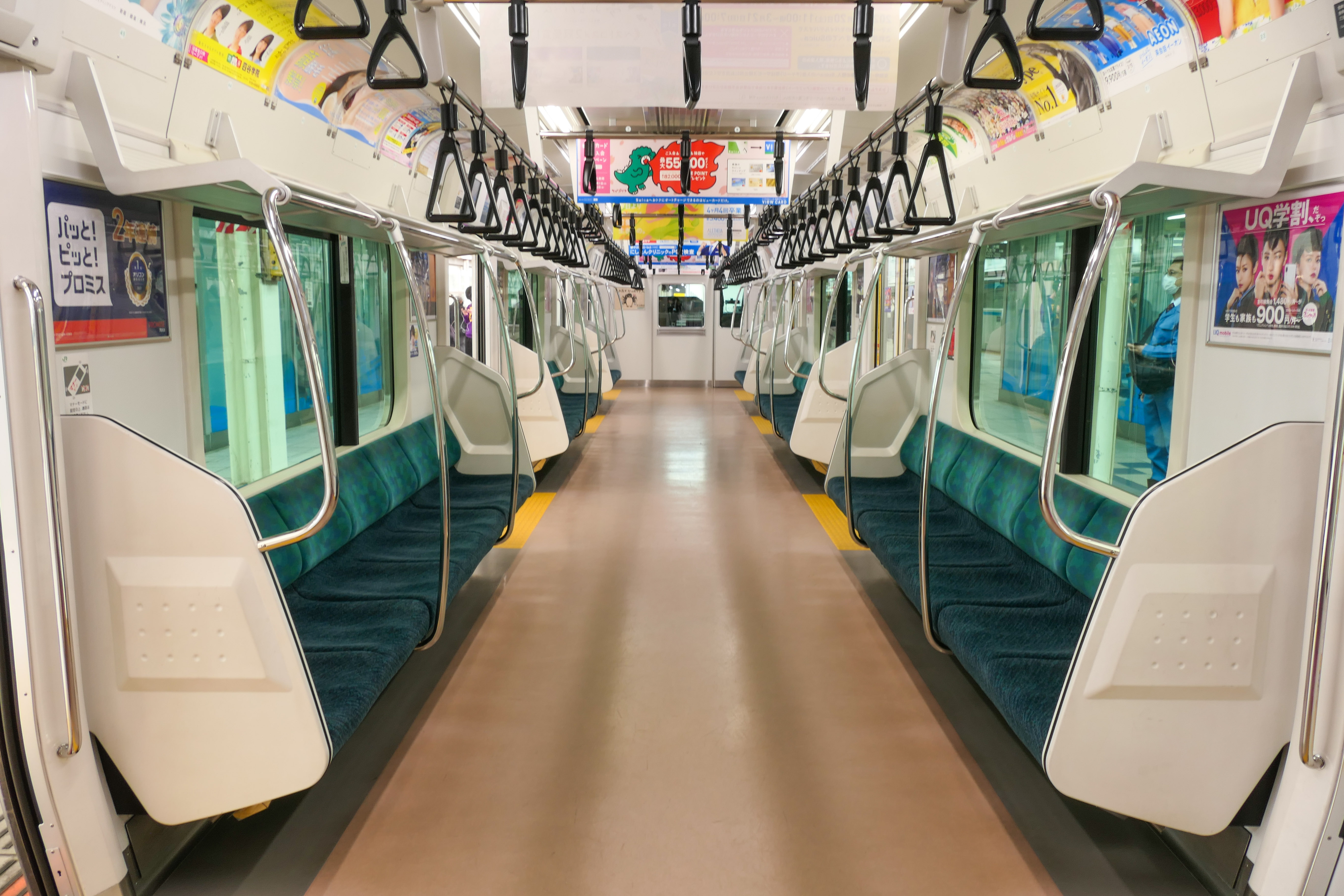
Interior view

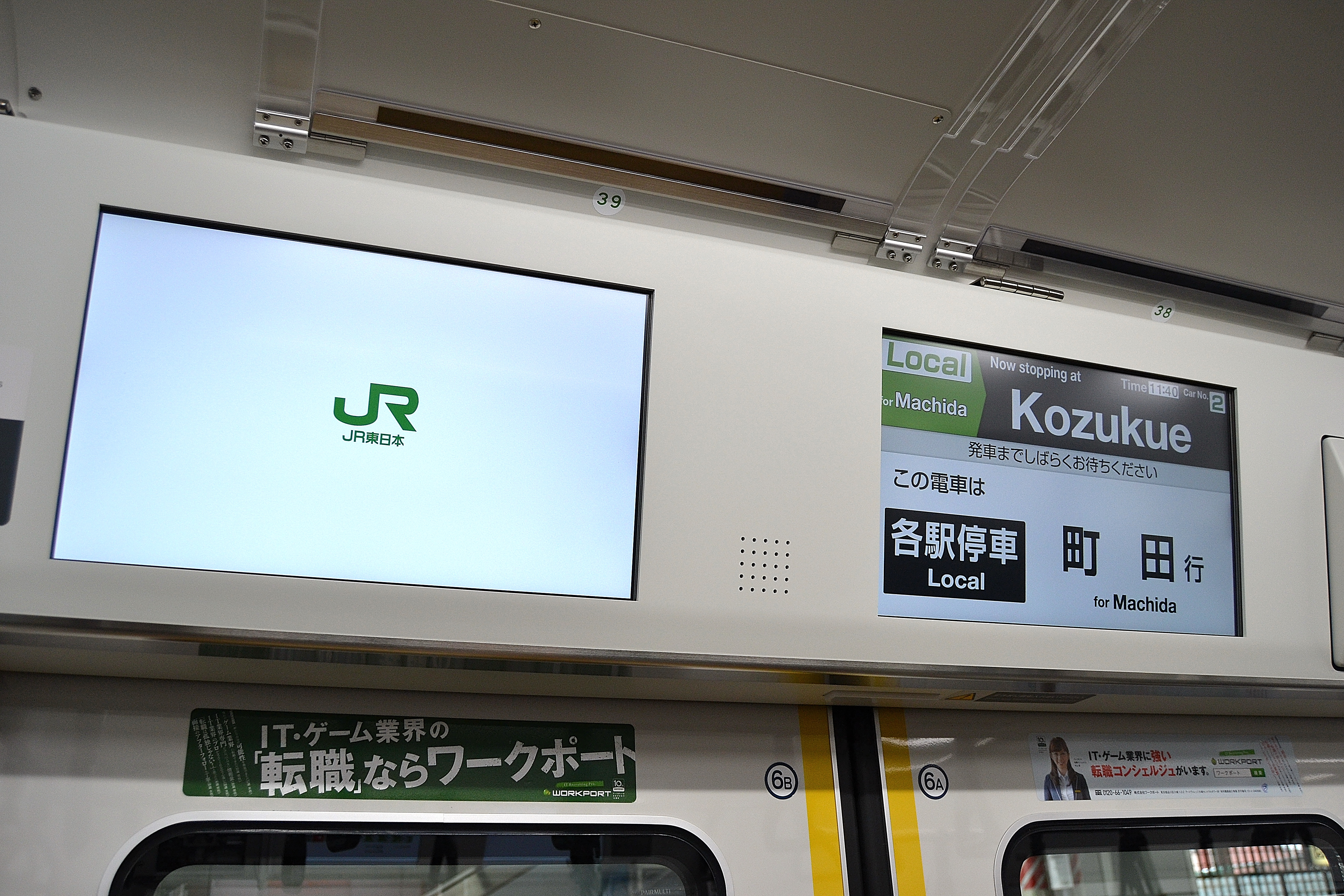
LCD passenger information screens above the doorways

=== Formation ===
As of September 2014, 28 8-car sets are based at Kamakura depot are formed with four motored ("M") cars and four non-powered trailer ("T") cars.

| | ← Hachiōji Shin-Yokohama, Ōfuna → | | | | | | | |
| Car No. | 8 | 7 | 6 | 5 | 4 | 3 | 2 | 1 |
| Designation | Tc | M | M' | T | M | M' | T | Tc' |
| Numbering | KuHa E233-6000 | MoHa E233-6400 | MoHa E232-6400 | SaHa E233-6000 | MoHa E233-6000 | MoHa E232-6000 | SaHa E233-6200 | KuHa E232-6000 |
| Weight (t) | 30.1 | 32.2 | 32.3 | 28.8 | 32.2 | 32.3 | 28.5 | 30.2 |
| Capacity (total/seated) | 142/39 | 160/54 | | | | | | 142/39 |

Car 4 has two single-arm PS33D pantographs (one reserve), and car 7 has one.

=== Build details ===
The build details for the fleet are as shown below.

| Set No. | Manufacturer | Date delivered |
|---|---|---|
| H001 | J-TREC, Niitsu | 17 January 2014 |
| H002 | J-TREC, Niitsu | 24 January 2014 |
| H003 | J-TREC, Niitsu | 5 February 2014 |
| H004 | J-TREC, Niitsu | 18 February 2014 |
| H005 | J-TREC, Niitsu | 28 February 2014 |
| H006 | J-TREC, Niitsu | 11 March 2014 |
| H007 | J-TREC, Niitsu | 24 March 2014 |
| H008 | J-TREC, Niitsu | 8 April 2014 |
| H009 | J-TREC, Niitsu | 24 April 2014 |
| H010 | J-TREC, Niitsu | 12 May 2014 |
| H011 | J-TREC, Niitsu | 30 May 2014 |
| H012 | J-TREC, Niitsu | 6 June 2014 |
| H013 | J-TREC, Niitsu | 13 June 2014 |
| H014 | J-TREC, Niitsu | 1 July 2014 |
| H015 | J-TREC, Niitsu | 10 July 2014 |
| H016 | J-TREC, Yokohama | 8 January 2014 |
| H017 | J-TREC, Yokohama | 15 January 2014 |
| H018 | J-TREC, Yokohama | 8 February 2014 |
| H019 | J-TREC, Yokohama | 19 February 2014 |
| H020 | J-TREC, Yokohama | 14 March 2014 |
| H021 | J-TREC, Yokohama | 26 March 2014 |
| H022 | J-TREC, Yokohama | 15 April 2014 |
| H023 | J-TREC, Yokohama | 2 May 2014 |
| H024 | J-TREC, Yokohama | 14 May 2014 |
| H025 | J-TREC, Yokohama | 17 June 2014 |
| H026 | J-TREC, Yokohama | 4 July 2014 |
| H027 | J-TREC, Yokohama | 6 August 2014 |
| H028 | J-TREC, Yokohama | 20 August 2014 |

== E233-7000 series ==
E233-7000 series
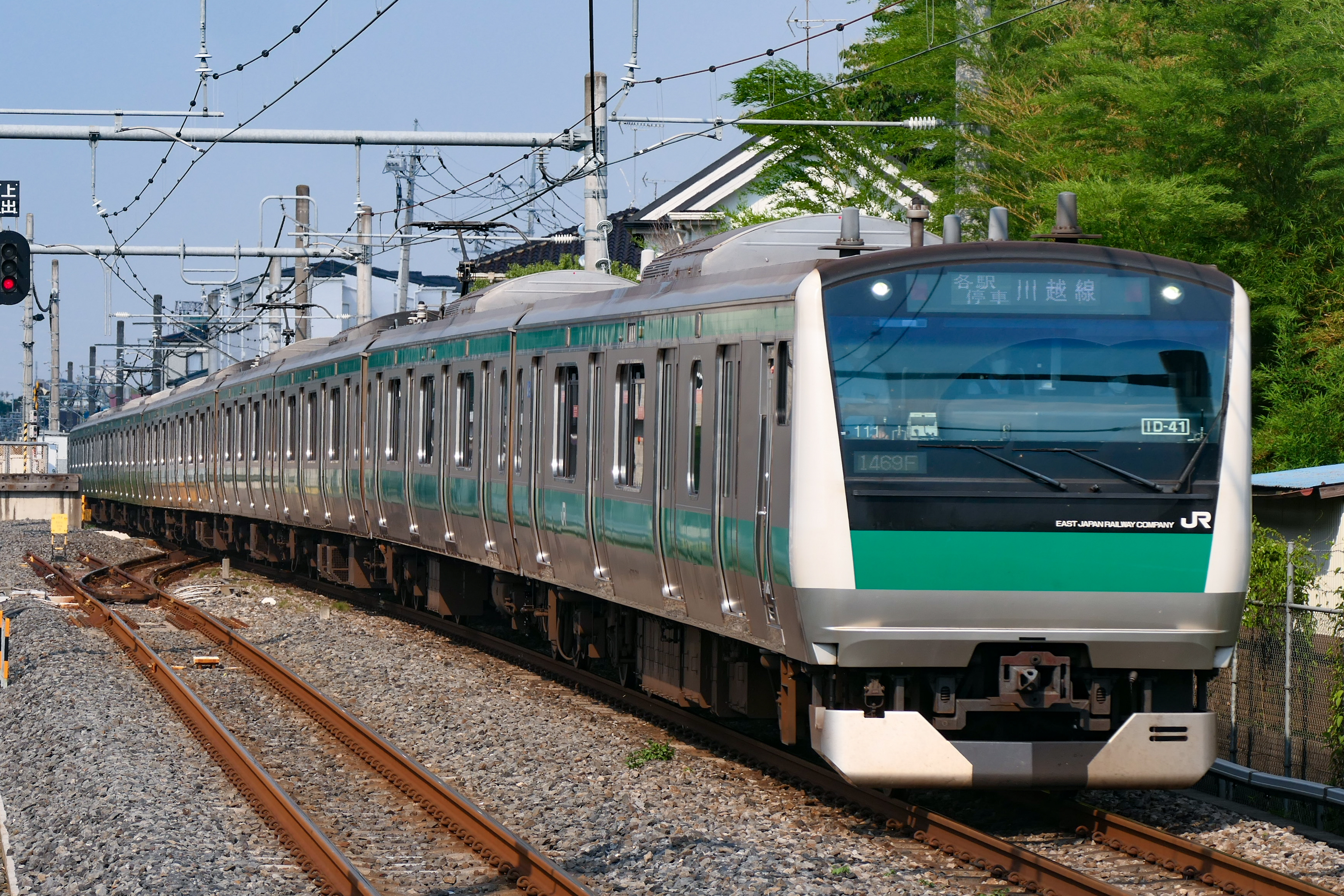
- Kawagoe Line E233-7000 series set 111 in June 2022
- Manufacturers: JR East, J-TREC
- Built at: Niitsu, Yokohama
- Replaced: 205 series
- Constructed: 2013–2014, 2019
- Entered service: 30 June 2013
- Number built: 380 vehicles (38 sets)
- Number in service: 380 vehicles (38 sets)
- Formation: 10 cars per trainset
- Fleet numbers: 101–138
- Operator: JR East
- Depot: Kawagoe
- Lines served: Saikyō Line; ■ Kawagoe Line; Rinkai Line; Sōtetsu-JR Link Line; Sōtetsu Shin-Yokohama Line; Sōtetsu Main Line

Specifications
- Car body construction: Stainless steel
- Car length: 20,000 mm (65 ft 7 in)
- Width: 2,950 mm (9 ft 8 in)
- Height: 3,620 mm (11 ft 11 in)
- Floor height: 1,130 mm (3 ft 8 in)
- Doors: 4 pairs per side
- Maximum speed: Service: 100 km/h (60 mph); Design: 120 km/h (75 mph)
- Acceleration: 3.0 km/(h⋅s) (1.9 mph/s)(Sotetsu through operation only, otherwise restricted to 2.5 km/(h⋅s) (1.6 mph/s))
- Deceleration: 5.0 km/(h⋅s) (3.1 mph/s)
- Electric system: 1,500 V DC overhead catenary
- Current collection: PS33D single-arm pantographs
- Bogies: DT71 (motored), TR255 (trailer)
- Safety systems: ATACS, ATC6, ATS-P, ATS-Ps
- Track gauge: 1,067 mm (3 ft 6 in)

These are ten-car sets operated on Kawagoe Line/Saikyō Line/Rinkai Line services between Kawagoe and Shin-Kiba since 30 June 2013. A total of 31 ten-car sets were delivered, displacing the fleet of 205 series EMUs previously used. These trains are the first E233 series variant to use LED interior lighting.

An additional seven more sets were delivered in 2019, in preparation for through running services between the Saikyō Line and the Sōtetsu Main Line via the newly built Sōtetsu Shin-Yokohama Line, bringing the total number of trains up to 38 ten-car sets. They began use on Sōtetsu Line services on 30 November 2019.

=== Interior ===
Passenger accommodation consists of longitudinal bench seating with individual seat widths of 460 mm (18 in).

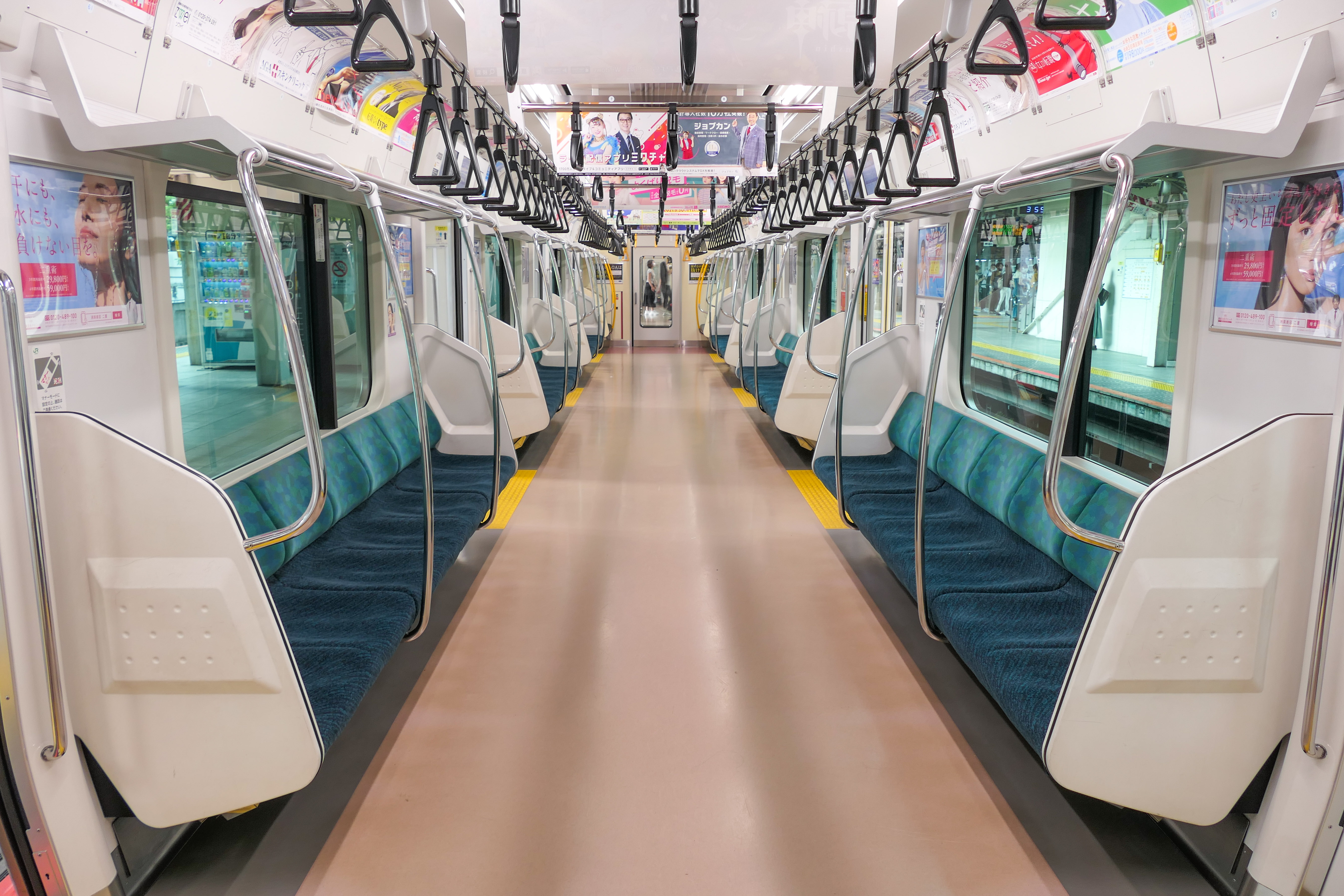
Interior view

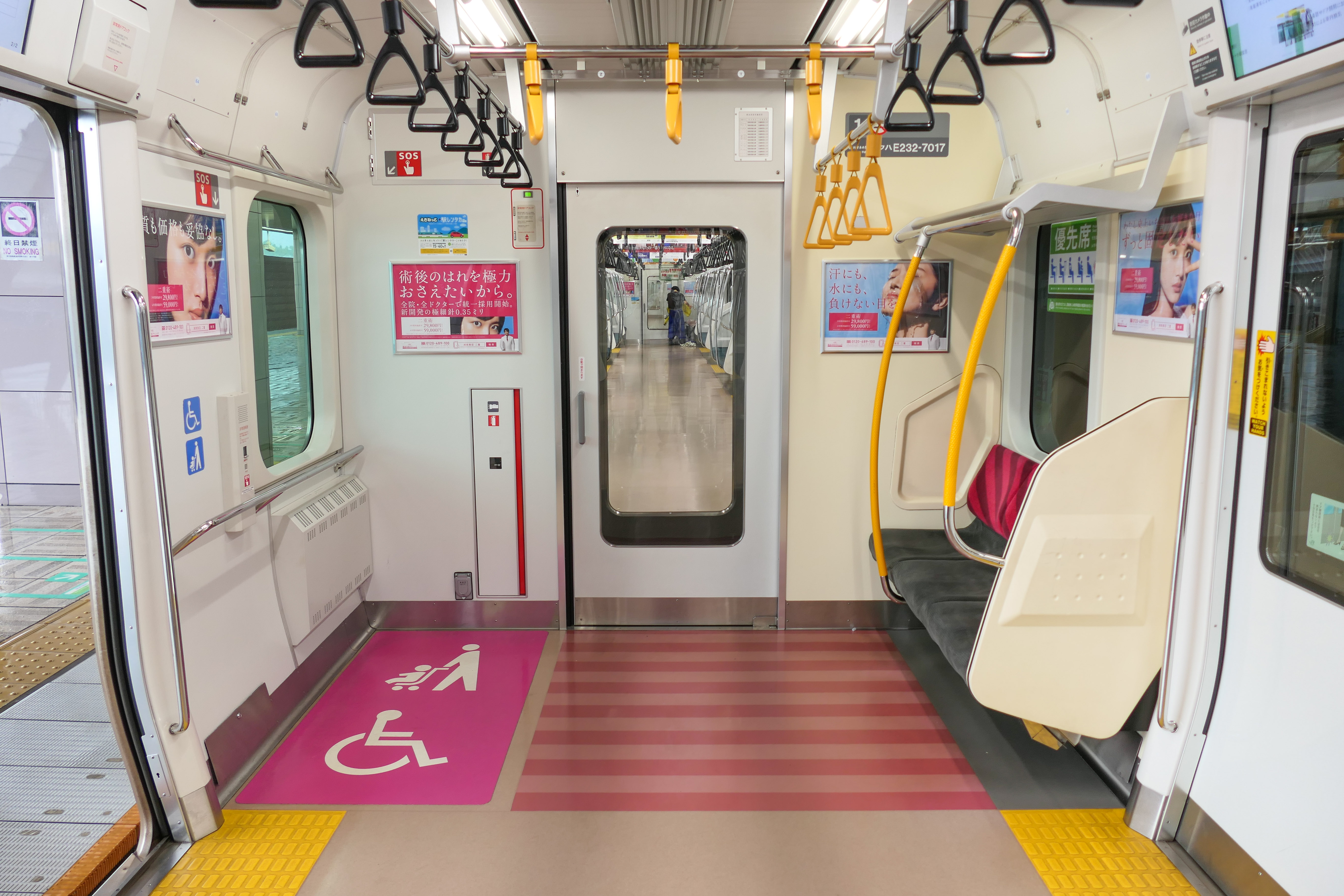
Priority seating

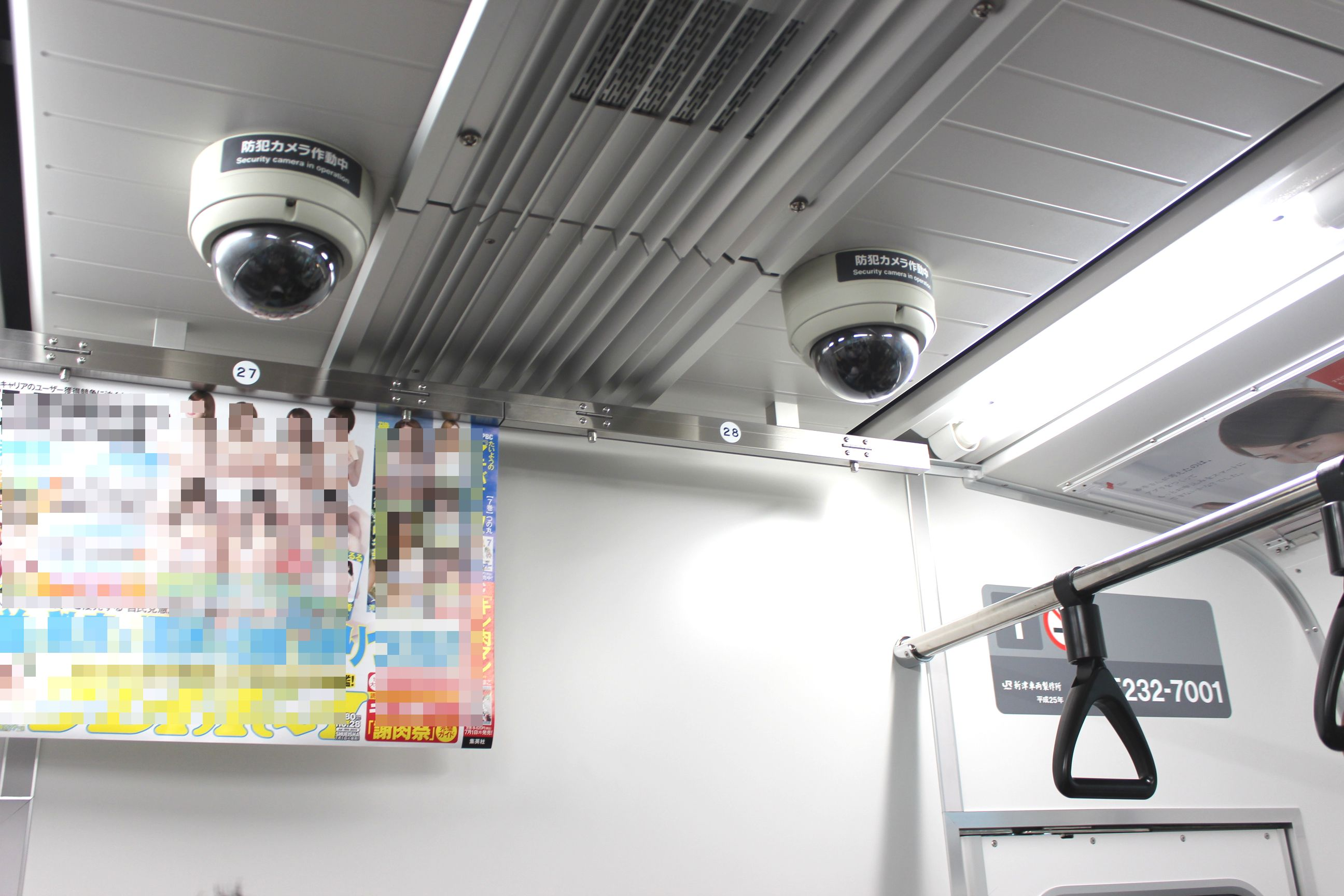
A ceiling-mounted security camera in car 1

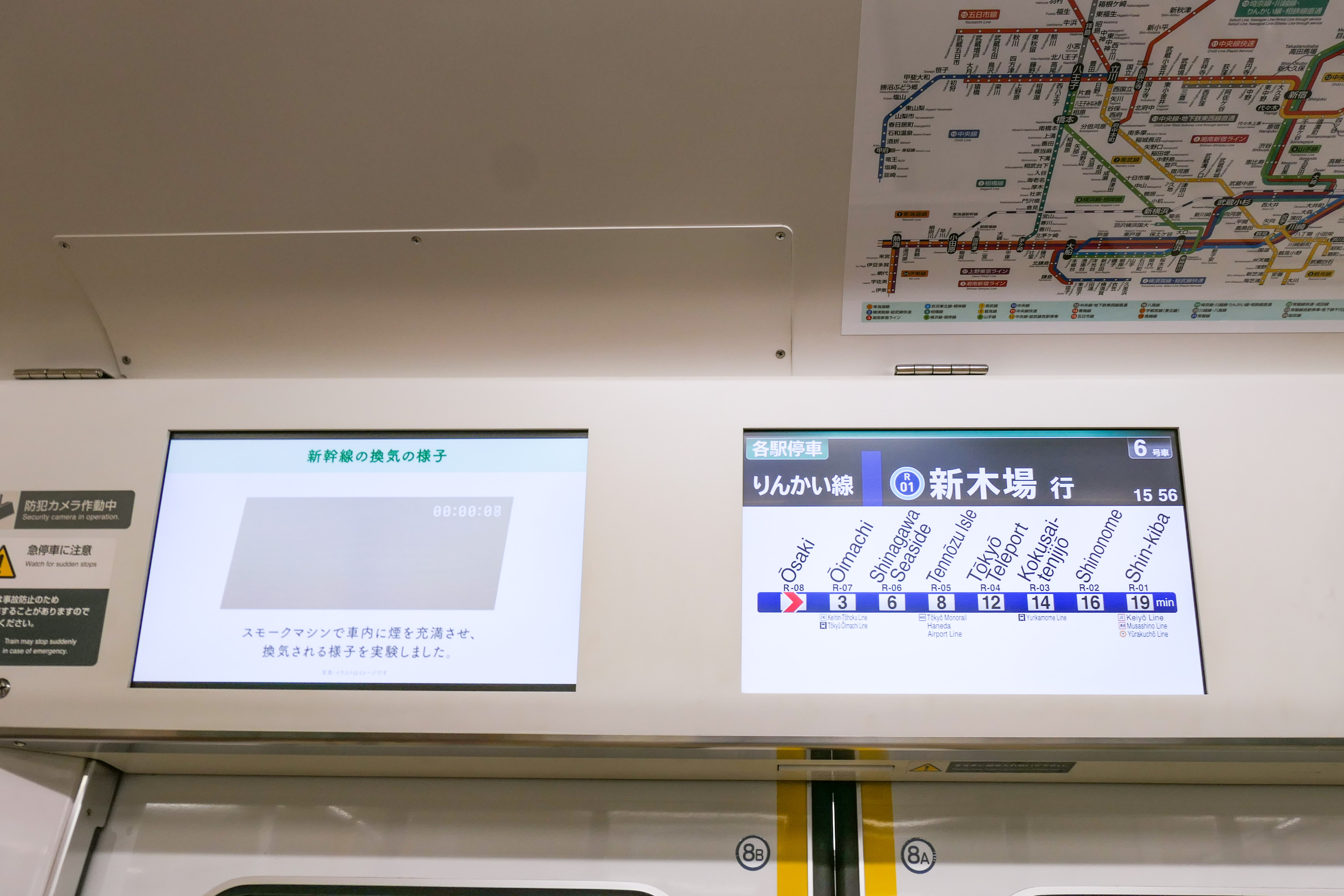
LCD passenger information screens above the doorways

=== Formation ===
As of 1 January 2020, all 38 ten-car sets are based at Kawagoe Depot and formed with six motored ("M") cars and four non-powered trailer ("T") cars.

| | ← Shōnandai, Ebina, Hazawa yokohama-kokudai, Shin-Kiba, Ōsaki Ōmiya, Kawagoe → | | | | | | | | | |
| Car No. | 10 | 9 | 8 | 7 | 6 | 5 | 4 | 3 | 2 | 1 |
| Designation | Tc | M | M' | T | | M | M' | M | M' | Tc' |
| Numbering | KuHa E233-7000 | MoHa E233-7400 | MoHa E232-7400 | SaHa E233-7200 | SaHa E233-7000 | MoHa E233-7000 | MoHa E232-7000 | MoHa E233-7200 | MoHa E232-7200 | KuHa E232-7000 |
| Capacity (total/seated) | 142/39 | 160/54 | | | | | | | | 142/39 |

- Cars 3 and 9 each have one PS33D single-arm pantograph, and car 5 has two PS33D single-arm pantographs (one is only used as a backup, the other gets normal use).
- Cars 1 and 10 have a wheelchair space.
- Car 9 is designated as a mildly air-conditioned car.

=== History ===
The first E233-7000 series set (number 101) was delivered to Kawagoe Depot from JR East's Niitsu factory on 9 April 2013. The first set built by J-TREC (set number 122) was delivered from the manufacturer's Yokohama factory in July 2013.

== E233-8000 series ==
E233-8000 series
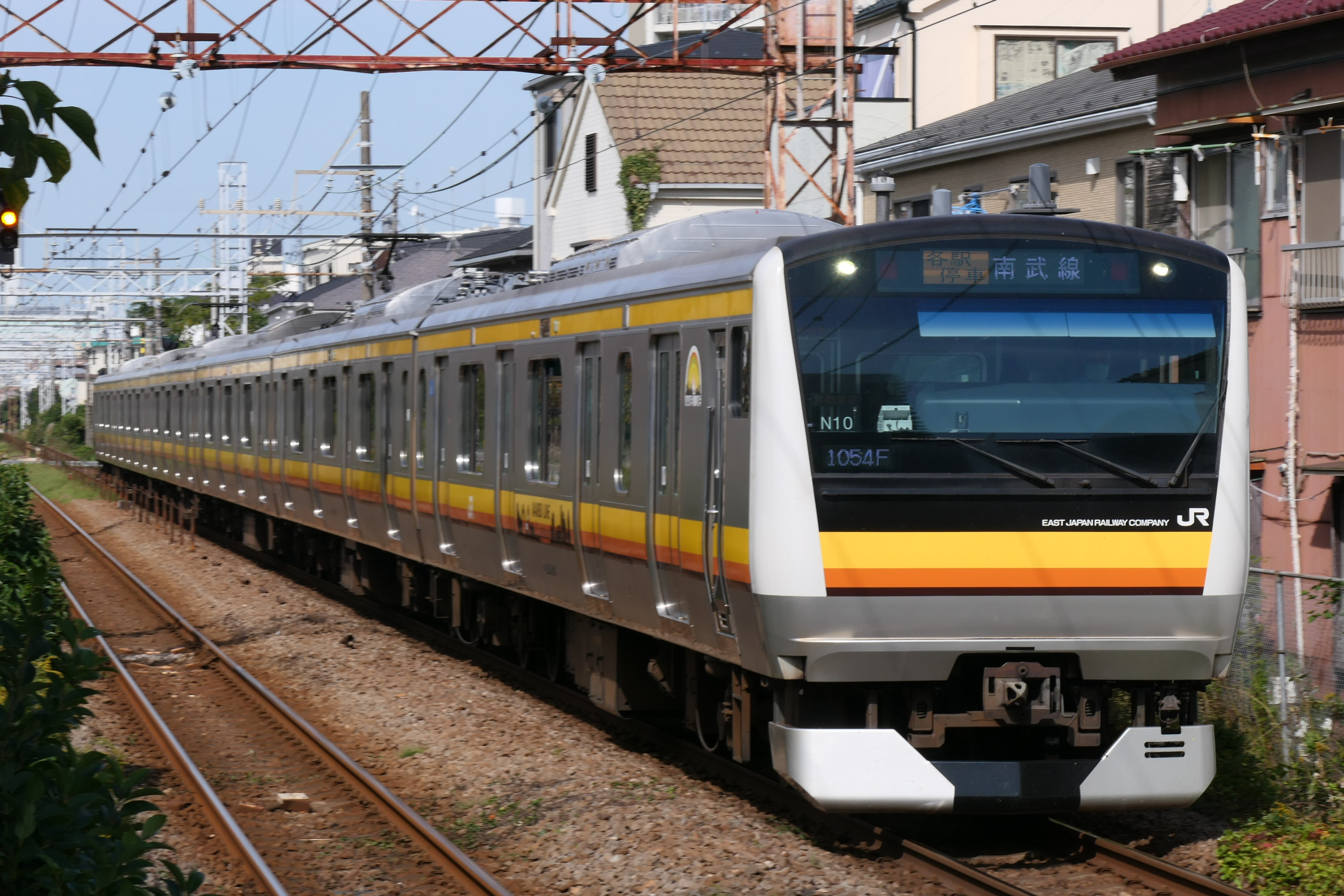
- E233-8000 series set N10 Local service on the Nambu Line
- Manufacturer: J-TREC
- Built at: Niitsu
- Replaced: 205 series, 209 series
- Constructed: 2014–2015
- Entered service: 4 October 2014
- Number built: 210 vehicles (35 sets)
- Number in service: 210 vehicles (35 sets)
- Formation: 6 cars per trainset
- Fleet numbers: N1–N35
- Operator: JR East
- Depot: Nakahara
- Line served: Nambu Line

Specifications
- Car body construction: Stainless steel
- Car length: 20,000 mm (65 ft 7 in)
- Width: 2,950 mm (9 ft 8 in)
- Height: 3,620 mm (11 ft 11 in)
- Doors: 4 pairs per side
- Maximum speed: 120 km/h (75 mph)
- Acceleration: 2.5 km/(h⋅s) (1.6 mph/s)
- Deceleration: 4.2 km/(h⋅s) (2.6 mph/s)
- Electric system: 1,500 V DC overhead catenary
- Current collection: PS33D single-arm pantographs
- Bogies: DT71 (motored), TR255 (trailer)
- Safety systems: ATS-P, ATS-SN
- Track gauge: 1,067 mm (3 ft 6 in)

These are six-car sets introduced on Nambu Line services between Kawasaki and Tachikawa from 4 October 2014. A total of 35 E233-8000 series sets (210 vehicles) are on order, displacing the previous fleet of 205 series and older 209 series EMUs.

=== Interior ===
Passenger accommodation consists of longitudinal bench seating throughout, with wheelchair spaces in cars 1 and 6. As with the earlier Yokohama Line E233-6000 series and Saikyo Line E233-7000 series variants, the trains use LED interior lighting.

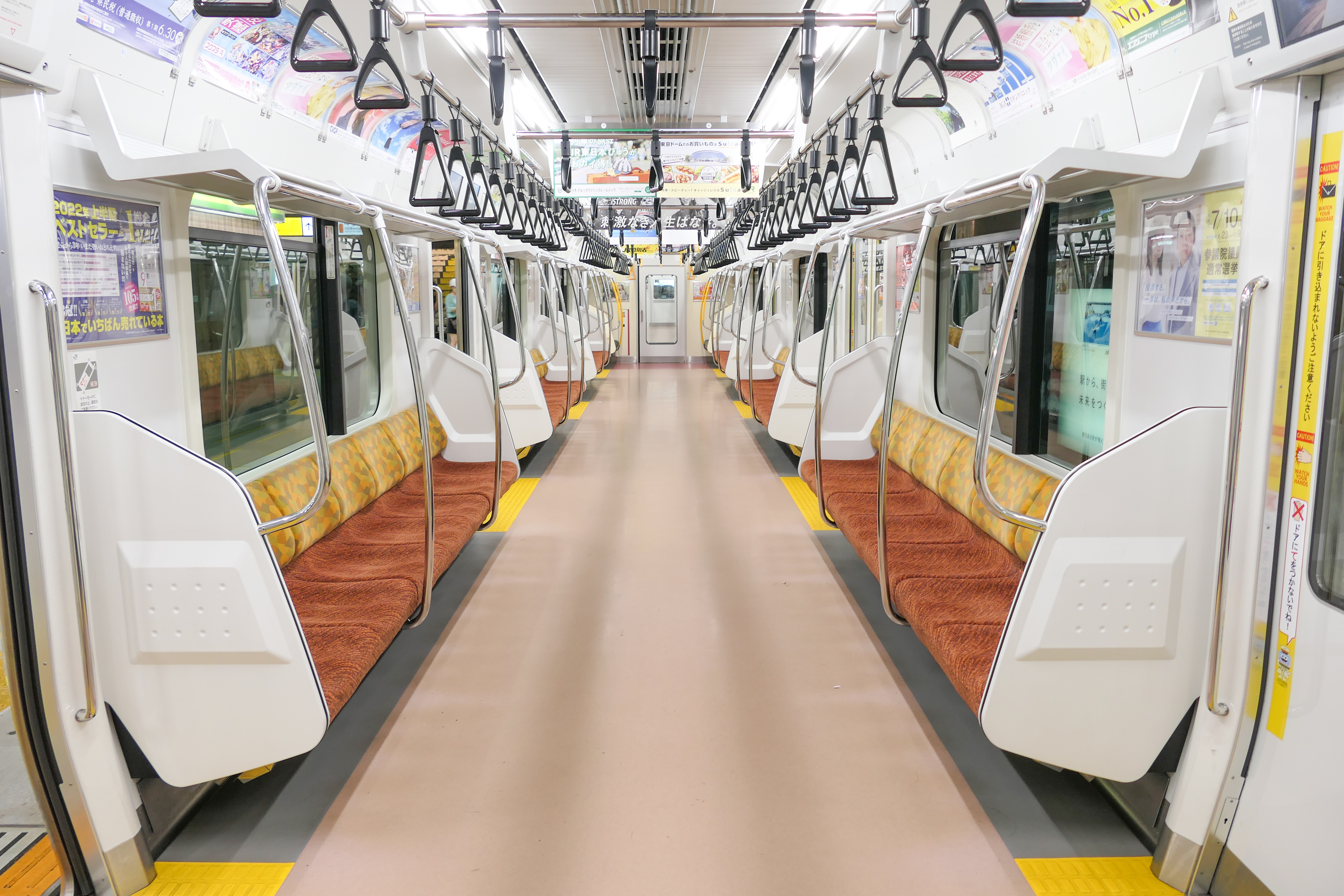
A view of the interior in June 2022

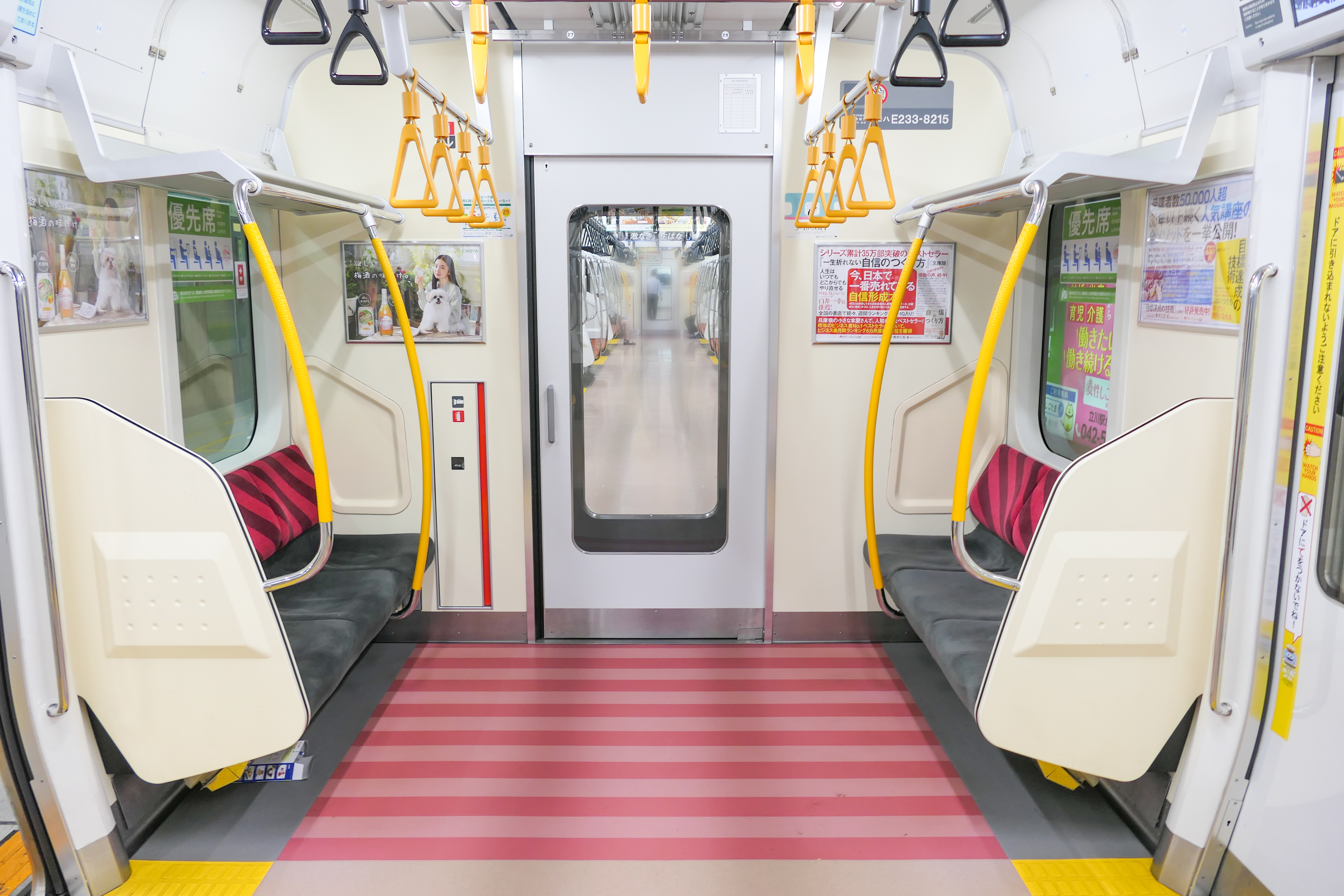
Priority seating in June 2022

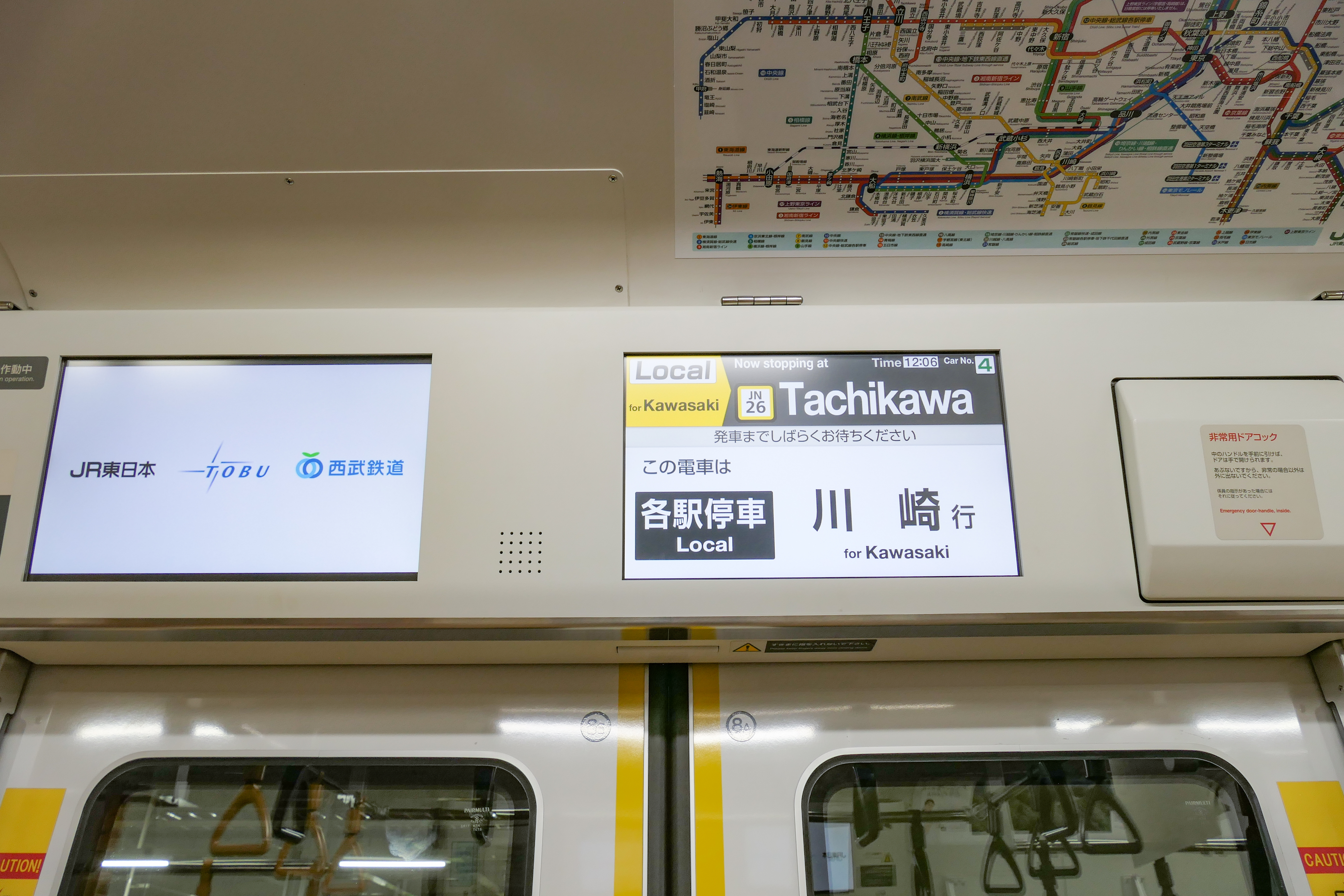
LCD passenger information panel above the doorway in June 2022

=== Formation ===
As of 2015, 35 six-car sets are based at Nakahara depot and formed with four motored ("M") cars and two non-powered trailer ("Tc") cars.

| | ← Kawasaki Tachikawa → | | | | | |
| Car No. | 1 | 2 | 3 | 4 | 5 | 6 |
| Designation | Tc | M | M' | M | M' | Tc' |
| Numbering | KuHa E233-8000 | MoHa E233-8000 | MoHa E232-8000 | MoHa E233-8200 | MoHa E232-8200 | KuHa E232-8000 |
| Weight (t) | 30.8 (Note: 31.0 t for cars fitted with rail greasing system.) | 32.3 | 31.7 | 31.6 | 28.6 | 30.8 |
| Capacity (total/seated) | 142/39 | 160/54 | | | | 142/39 |

Notes

- Car 4 has one PS33D single-arm pantograph, and car 2 has two single-arm pantographs (one used as a backup).
- Cars 1 and 6 have a wheelchair space.
- Car 4 is designated as a mildly air-conditioned car.

=== History ===
The first set, N1 was delivered from the J-TREC factory in Niitsu in August 2014. It entered revenue service from 4 October 2014.

=== Build details ===
The delivery dates for the fleet are as shown below.

| Set No. | Date delivered |
|---|---|
| N1 | 31 July 2014 |
| N2 | 8 August 2014 |
| N3 | 22 August 2014 |
| N4 | 2 September 2014 |
| N5 | 12 September 2014 |
| N6 | 3 October 2014 |
| N7 | 16 October 2014 |
| N8 | 30 October 2014 |
| N9 | 14 November 2014 |
| N10 | 2 December 2014 |
| N11 | 24 December 2014 |
| N12 | 6 January 2015 |
| N13 | 21 January 2015 |
| N14 | 6 March 2015 |
| N15 | 16 March 2015 |
| N16 | 30 March 2015 |
| N17 | 13 April 2015 |
| N18 | 27 April 2015 |
| N19 | 14 May 2015 |
| N20 | 28 May 2015 |
| N21 | 11 June 2015 |
| N22 | 25 June 2015 |
| N23 | 9 July 2015 |
| N24 | 27 July 2015 |
| N25 | 11 August 2015 |
| N26 | 25 August 2015 |
| N27 | 7 September 2015 |
| N28 | 18 September 2015 |
| N29 | 2 October 2015 |
| N30 | 20 October 2015 |
| N31 | 4 November 2015 |
| N32 | 16 November 2015 |
| N33 | 26 November 2015 |
| N34 | 10 December 2015 |
| N35 | 17 December 2015 |

== E233-8500 series ==
E233-8500 series
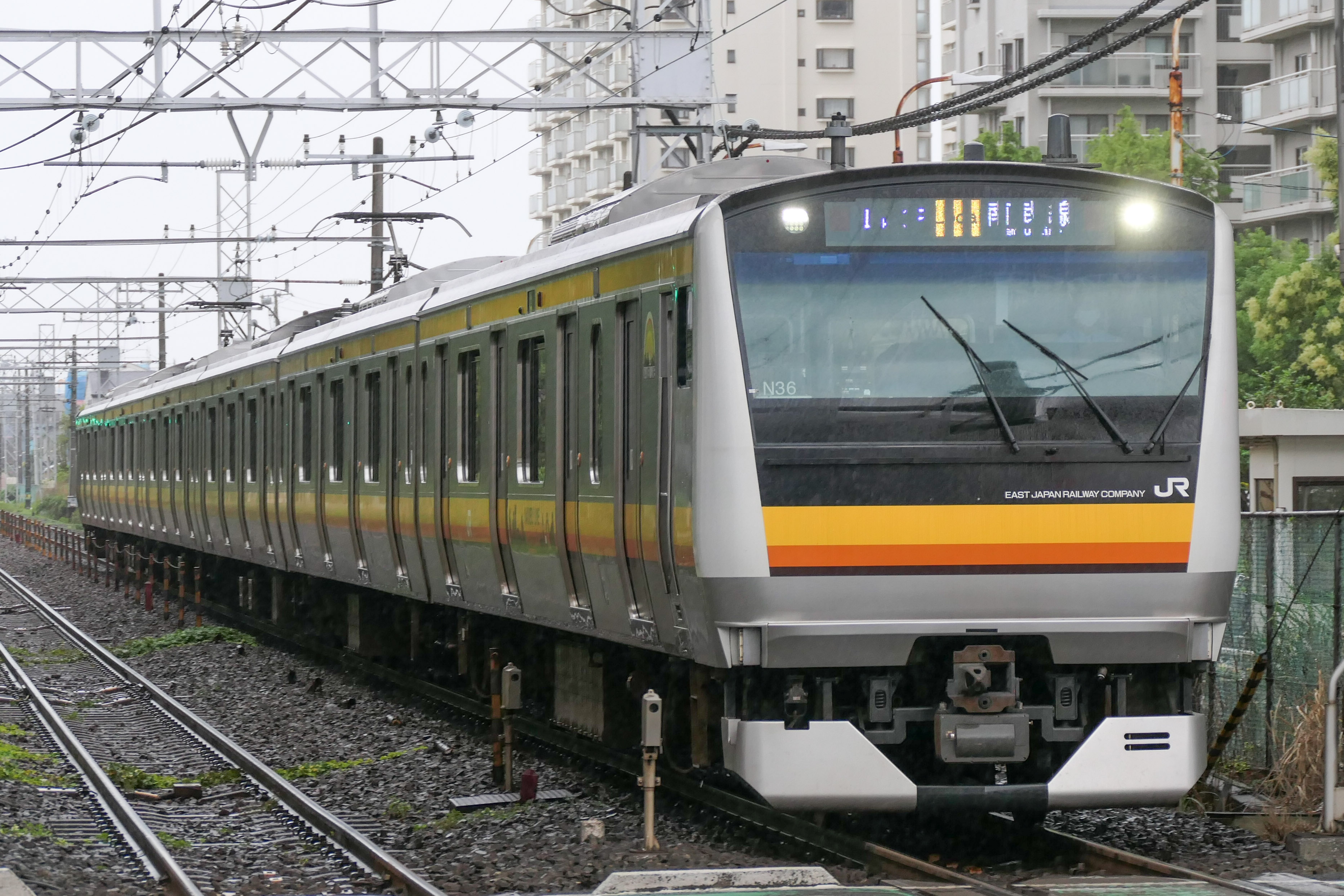
- E233-8500 series set N36 in June 2021
- Replaced: 209-2200 series
- Constructed: 2008
- Entered service: 15 March 2017
- Refurbished: 2017
- Number built: 6 vehicles (1 set)
- Number in service: 6 vehicles (1 set)
- Formation: 6 cars per trainset
- Fleet numbers: N36
- Operator: JR East
- Depot: Nakahara
- Line served: Nambu Line

Specifications
- Car body construction: Stainless steel
- Car length: 20,000 mm (65 ft 7 in)
- Width: 2,950 mm (9 ft 8 in)
- Height: 3,620 mm (11 ft 11 in)
- Doors: 4 pairs per side
- Maximum speed: 120 km/h (75 mph)
- Acceleration: 2.5 km/(h⋅s) (1.6 mph/s)
- Deceleration: 4.2 km/(h⋅s) (2.6 mph/s)
- Electric system: 1,500 V DC overhead catenary
- Safety systems: ATS-P, ATS-SN
- Track gauge: 1,067 mm (3 ft 6 in)

In 2017, six-car Itsukaichi Line/Ōme Line set Ao670 was modified and renumbered at Omiya Works to become the sole E233-8500 series set N36 for use on the Nambu Line alongside the fleet of E233-8000 series sets and replacing the last remaining 209 series EMU still in use there. In addition to receiving the Nambu Line livery carried by the E233-8000 series fleet, modifications included adding a WiMAX antenna and replacing the original 15-inch (381 mm) LCD passenger display screens with 17-inch (432 mm) screens. Set N36 entered service on the Nambu Line on 15 March 2017.

=== Formation ===
As of March 2017, 1 six-car set is based at Nakahara depot and formed with four motored ("M") cars and two non-powered trailer ("Tc") cars.

| | ← Kawasaki Tachikawa → | | | | | |
| Car No. | 1 | 2 | 3 | 4 | 5 | 6 |
| Designation | Tc | M | M' | M | M' | Tc' |
| Numbering | KuHa E233-8500 | MoHa E233-8500 | MoHa E232-8500 | MoHa E233-8700 | MoHa E232-8700 | KuHa E232-8500 |
| Capacity (total/seated) | 142/39 | 160/54 | 160/54 | 160/54 | 160/54 | 142/42 |

- Car 4 has one PS33D single-arm pantograph, and car 2 has two single-arm pantographs (one used as a backup).
- Car 1 has a wheelchair space.
- Car 4 is designated as a mildly air-conditioned car.

== Accidents ==
Keihin–Tōhoku Line E233-1000 series set 177 was derailed in a collision with a track maintenance vehicle in the early hours of 23 February 2014 near Kawasaki Station while on an empty stock train operating from Sakuragicho to Kamata. The first two cars of the ten-car train derailed, with the first car ending up on its side. The train was carrying no passengers, and the driver and conductor escaped with minor injuries. The two derailed cars from the set involved, KuHa E233-1077 and SaHa E233-1277, were formally withdrawn in December 2016.

== E233 series derivatives ==
=== Export ===
- PNR EM1000 class, a Philippine standard gauge commuter where the body of this class is derived from.

=== Local ===
- E129 series, an E233 series derivative for use on local services in the Niigata area
- Odakyu 4000 series, an E233-2000 series derivative
- Sotetsu 11000 series, an E233 series derivative
- Toei 10-300 series, an E233-2000 series derivative (Batches 3 onwards)
- TWR 71-000 series, an E233 series derivative
