= Punktförmige Zugbeeinflussung =

German train protection system

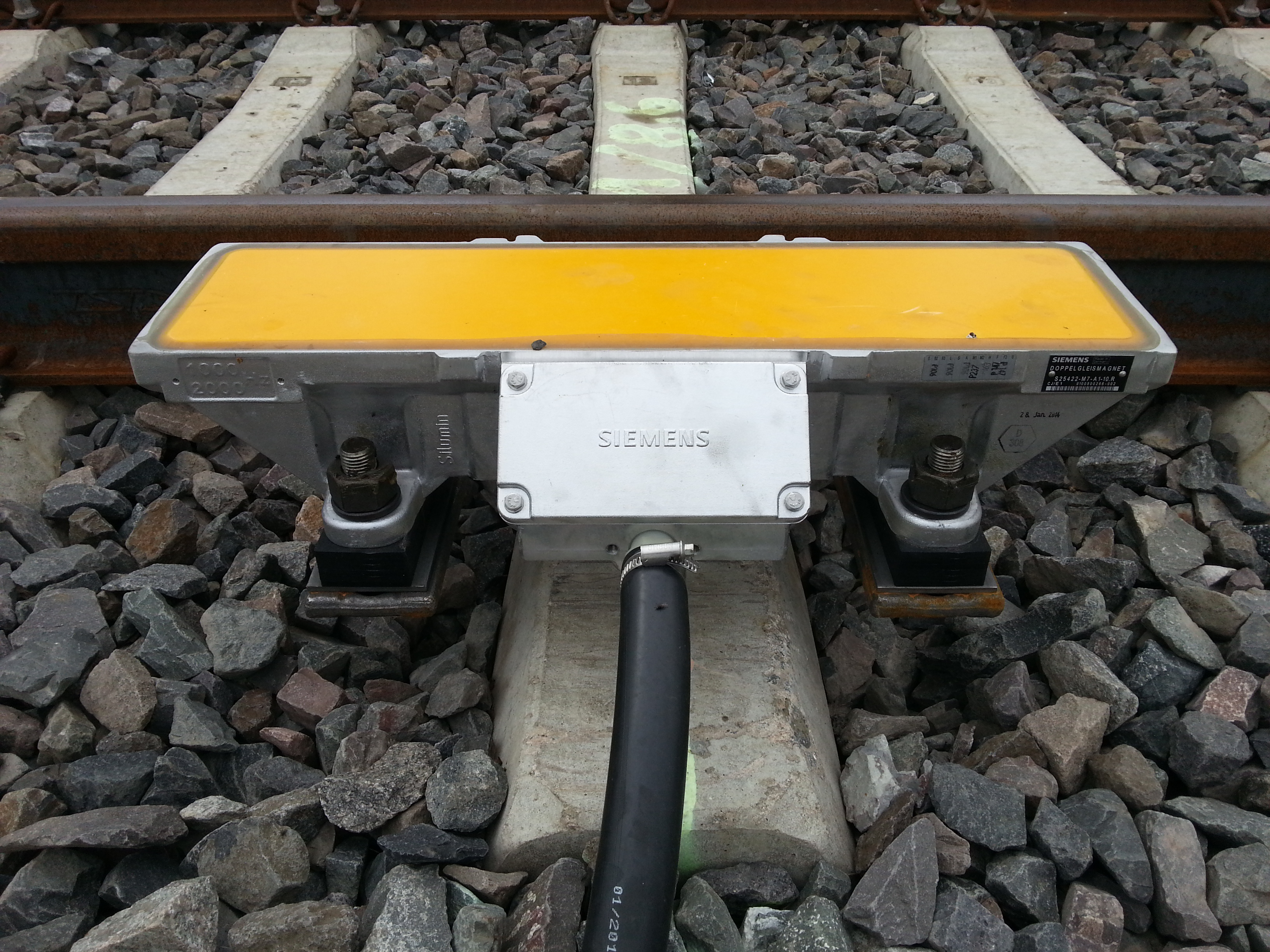
Modern-style inductor next to a rail

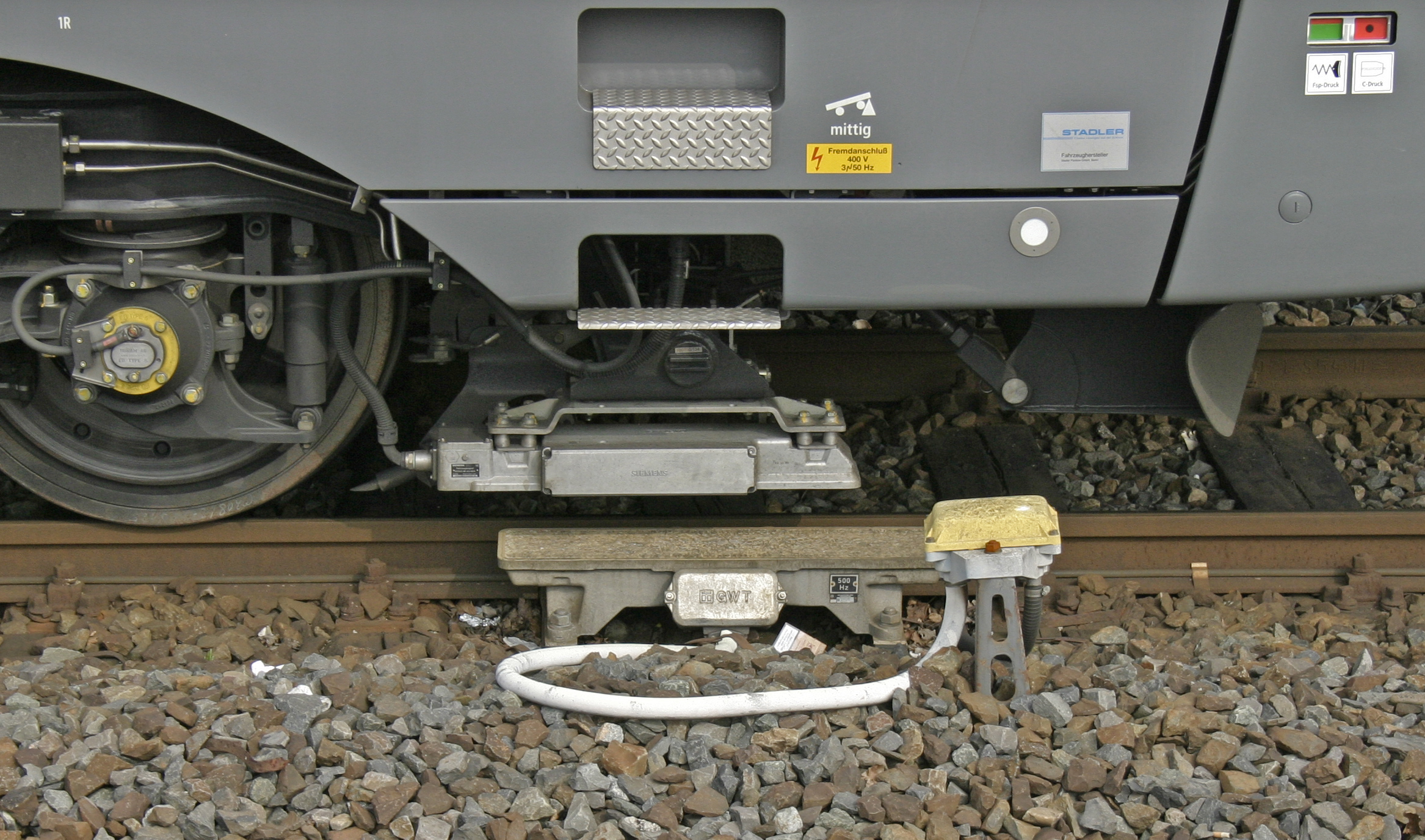
Trackside resonator (below) and train-borne generator / reader (above)

PZB, or Indusi, is an intermittent cab signalling system and train protection system used in Germany, Austria, Slovenia, Croatia, Romania, Israel, Serbia, on two lines in Hungary, on the Tyne and Wear Metro in the UK, and formerly on the Trillium Line in Canada.

Developed in Germany, the historic short name Indusi was derived from German Induktive Zugsicherung ("inductive train protection"). Later generations of the system were named PZB (short for German Punktförmige Zugbeeinflussung, literally "punctiform train influencing", translated as "intermittent train protection" or officially "intermittent automatic train running control"), highlighting that the PZB/Indusi system is a family of intermittent train control systems, in comparison with the continuous train control systems including LZB (German Linienzugbeeinflussung, literally "linear train influencing") that were introduced at the time.

Originally, Indusi provided warnings and enforced braking only if the warning was not acknowledged (similar to a traditional automatic train stop). The later PZB systems provide more enforcement, relying on an onboard computer.

== History ==
Experiments with magnetic induction for a train protection system can be traced back as early as 1908. All of the early prototypes required track-side electricity supply, however, which was not available in the mechanical interlocking stations widespread at the time. Parallel investigations looked at optical recognition equipment (German Optische Zugsicherung / OPSI); this was however not developed further on the basis of instability due to dirt and dust on the lenses.

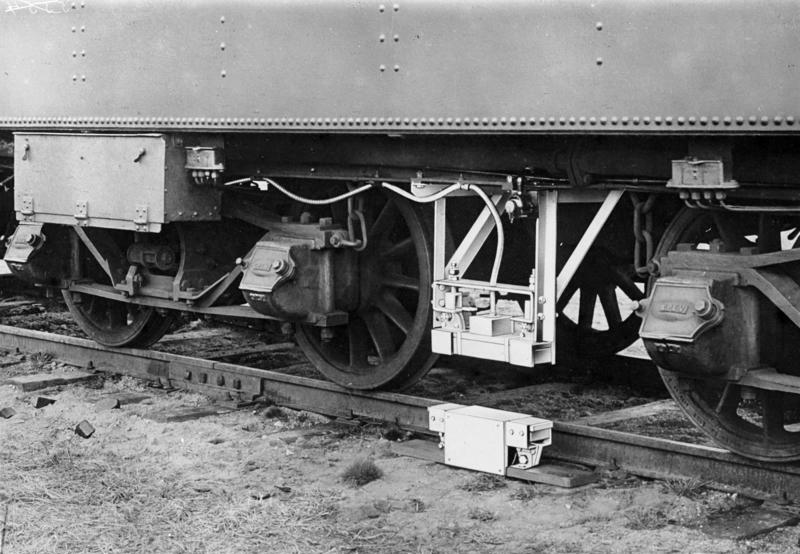
Indusi prototype on a steam locomotive in May 1930

Since 1931, the development concentrated on an inductive train protection system (Indusi) that did not require electricity. In a parallel development, Switzerland started to introduce the Integra-Signum system in 1933, based on similar ideas. The Swiss system did not use a resonance frequency, but a static magnetization which can only be detected as a signal when the train is moving fast enough. While the frequency induction method was considered superior, the German system needed the installation of frequency generators on the locomotive which was a demanding endeavour at the time of steam engines being the predominant locomotive type. The Indusi system was deployed in Germany in 1934, and the system spread to Austria and countries of the historic Austro-Hungarian Empire, which shared a common root with Germany in terms of rail transport history during the German Customs Union.

=== I 34 ===
The original Indusi system was deployed in Germany in 1934 – it was not called by that name, however (using the full title "induktive Zugsicherung") and the shorthand "I 34" is a retrospective designation as well. The initial tests only used a train stop function (the 2000 Hz signal in later revisions) – by the end of 1934 there were already 165 locomotives equipped with the Indusi detectors and 4500 km of track were secured with inductors. At the end of WWII the system was not functional anymore and in 1944 the equipment of 870 locomotives and the Indusi signals on 6700 km of track were officially switched off.

During 1947 the Indusi resonators of the locomotives were re-enabled together with a network of 1180 km of track in western occupied zones.

=== I 54 ===
The Deutsche Bundesbahn started an effort to standardize the function of a modern Indusi system leading to the Indusi I 54 specification in 1954. This included a new frequency generator that did not require three motors but only a single transistor frequency generator with a downstream audio crossover to emit the three frequencies in parallel.

=== I 60 ===
Minor improvements in the 1960s led to the Indusi I 60 system. When a 1000 Hz inductor was encountered, the driver had to acknowledge the caution signal within four seconds. Additionally, a countdown was started to check whether the train had slowed to a specified speed within a specified time frame. Depending on the type of train the locomotive was hauling, the system could be manually switched between three modes of operation: freight train, low speed and high speed passenger train. In each mode, the system calculated a different speed curve based on the maximum allowable speed and braking characteristics of the train.

The original I 60 system proved insufficient in a number of situations, so it saw multiple revisions that finally led to the revised standard I 60R.

=== I 60R ===
With the introduction of Linienzugbeeinflussung (LZB) by Deutsche Bundesbahn the locomotives were equipped with a microprocessor-based LZB/I 80 train protection system. It was able to pick up the Indusi signals since 1980. The experience with this system led to the development of the Indusi I 60R system that required microprocessors in all locomotives. Instead of checking certain speeds at certain points in time, the new system continuously checked a curve of speed against time. If the train was faster than the curve allowed, a stop could be enforced at any time.

=== PZ80 ===
The PZ80 is an independent development of GDR based company Geräte- und Reglerwerk Teltow. There was a need for efficient train protection systems by the Deutsche Reichsbahn. They wanted to gain independence from the technically obsolete I 60 supply by the West-German Siemens manufacturer and replacement imports of the Romanian I 60 Icret. The PZ80 supported all Indusi 60 modes enhanced with a number of new modes including speed control in steps of 10 km/h, continuous braking curves and a restrictive mode. In 1990 the developer was sold by the Treuhand institution to Siemens. So this system was the foundation of the upcoming PZB90 system.

=== PZB90 ===
PZB90 is a new version, deployed in the mid-1990s. It features a new 'restrictive mode' as the result of two accidents. In both cases a train had stopped at a station as intended. Then the train accelerated again, despite the signal still showing red. When the train reached the exit signal, its speed was sufficient to crash into another train despite the automatic braking enforced by the 2000 Hz inductor.

The new restrictive mode limits speeds after a train stopped before reaching a red signal. Currently, trains are limited to 45 km/h when stopping after an active 1000 Hz inductor or to 25 km/h when stopping after an active 500 Hz inductor.

=== Software 1.6 ===
The software update of PZB90 to version 1.6 had important changes to the braking curves: for most train types the target speed was lowered while allowing a longer time interval. This is a change on the old Indusi specification that had fixed intervals. The new software version can use uneven times – for example train type O must have 85 km/h after 23 seconds which had been previously specified as 95 km/h after 20 seconds. The new braking curves have been found by extensive simulation to get a better tradeoff between security and efficiency so that train operation is optimized.

Another change is bound to the alert functions – when a restrictive mode is extended by another 1000 Hz it does not activate the cab signal if a previous warning signal had been acknowledged. When starting from a halted position many restrictive modes could be released ("PZB frei" button) as they had been purely based on time – since version 1.6 the actual section length is controlled where the PZB restrictive mode can not be released. This led to some changes in railway stations with moving 1000 Hz inductors.

=== Software 2.0 ===
The software update of PZB90 to version 2.0 changed some corner cases of the train control – previously it had been possible to lift any restrictive mode by changing the reverser from forward to reverse and back to forward. From version 2.0 on it will remember the enforced speed restriction. Another change was a malfunction when the train had been halted directly over an inductor that could only be released by using the fault reset which however would also drop all speed restrictions from external signaling.

== Function ==
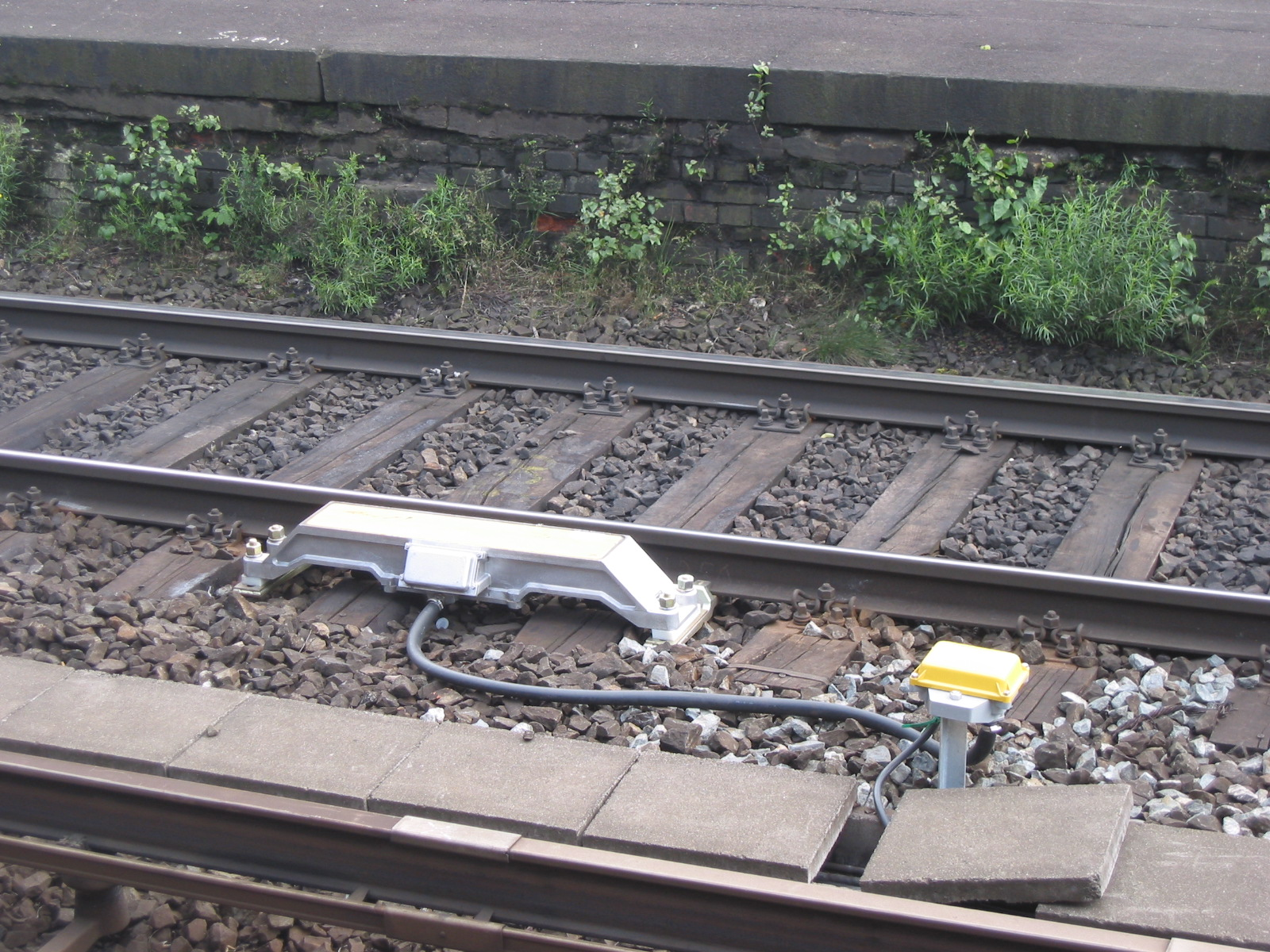
PZB inductor ("trackside antenna")

Locomotives and multiple unit cars with operating cabs are equipped with onboard transmitter coils with the superimposed frequencies 500 Hz, 1000 Hz and 2000 Hz. Passive tuned inductors (RLC circuits) are situated at appropriate trackside locations; each inductor resonates at one of the three frequencies, depending on its location. When the leading end of the train passes over one of the trackside inductors, the inductor's presence is detected by the onboard equipment through a change in magnetic flux. This activates the appropriate onboard circuit and triggers whatever action is required based on the location (e.g., an audible/visual warning, enforced speed limit, or enforced stop).

The three frequencies have different meanings to the train:

=== 1000-Hz speed limiter ===
Warning that the distant signal being passed shows "caution", drop of speed required. Driver has to confirm that they have seen the "caution" aspect by pressing a button; failure to do so within a few seconds results in a forced stop.

The 1000 Hz is active along with a yellow signal on a distant signal before a main signal, or on a main signal combined with a distant option for the following main signal, or it is active before a railroad crossing.

The train driver has to acknowledge the cab signaling within 4 seconds (2.5 seconds on trains with an MVB electronic bus) by hitting a button – this is called vigilance test (German "Wachsamkeitskontrolle"). Failing to do so will result in an emergency stop.

After acknowledging the warning signal the train has to stay below the braking curve (German "Bremskurve") – fast trains may travel up to 165 km/h and they must reduce the speed to below 85 km/h after 23 seconds. Note that the operation of high speed trains beyond 165 km/h is not based on visual wayside signals or PZB inductors (using LZB or European Train Control System cab-signalling instead in Germany).

The train cannot be released from the speed restrictions within 700 m after the 1000 Hz activation. After that point the train driver may hit a release button (German "Freitaste"). In later generations the enforced speed limit was extended to 1250 m and the 700 m point is only relevant for the 500 Hz inductor.

The monitored speed (German "überwachte Geschwindigkeit") depends on the train type which is in direct relation to the mass and braking capability – the quotient of these is given in braking percent (German "Bremshundertstel"). If the train speed drops below a switch speed (German "Umschaltgeschwindigkeit") the restricted mode is activated – this includes a constant maximum speed of 45 km/h up to the 500 Hz inductor which lowers the speed even further during the restricted speed control (German "restriktive Geschwindigkeitsüberwachung").

PZB-90- train type	Brems- hundertstel	maximum speed V_{ü1}	restricted speed V_{ü2}	switch speed V_{um}
O (higher)	over 110	from 165 km/h to 85 km/h within 23 s	constant 45 km/h	constant 10 km/h
M (medium)	66 to 110	from 125 km/h to 70 km/h within 29 s	constant 45 km/h	constant 10 km/h
U (lower)	below 66	from 105 km/h to 55 km/h within 38 s	constant 45 km/h	constant 10 km/h

=== 500-Hz speed limiter ===
Immediate maximum speed (V_{max}) as well as further drop of speed are enforced.

The 500 Hz inductor can be found shortly before a main signal which actives a speed control for next 250 m. This will extend the braking curve V_{ü1} from the 1000 Hz up to the main signal. The restricted mode after a 1000 Hz is followed by a braking curve V_{ü2} to reduce the speed up to the main signal. While the switch speed was at 10 km/h after the 1000 Hz speed limiter (reflecting a full stop of the train) it does now follow braking curve being again no more than 10 km/h at the position of the main signal. The actual braking curves depend again on the train type (which is based on the braking percent the train driver has calculated).

PZB-90- train type	maximum speed V_{ü1}	restricted speed V_{ü2}	switch speed V_{um}
O (higher)	from 65 km/h to 45 km/h within 153 m	from 45 km/h to 25 km/h within 153 m	from 30 km/h to 10 km/h within 153 m
M (medium)	from 50 km/h to 35 km/h within 153 m	constant 25 km/h	constant 10 km/h
U (lower)	from 40 km/h to 25 km/h within 153 m	constant 25 km/h	constant 10 km/h

=== 2000-Hz emergency stop ===
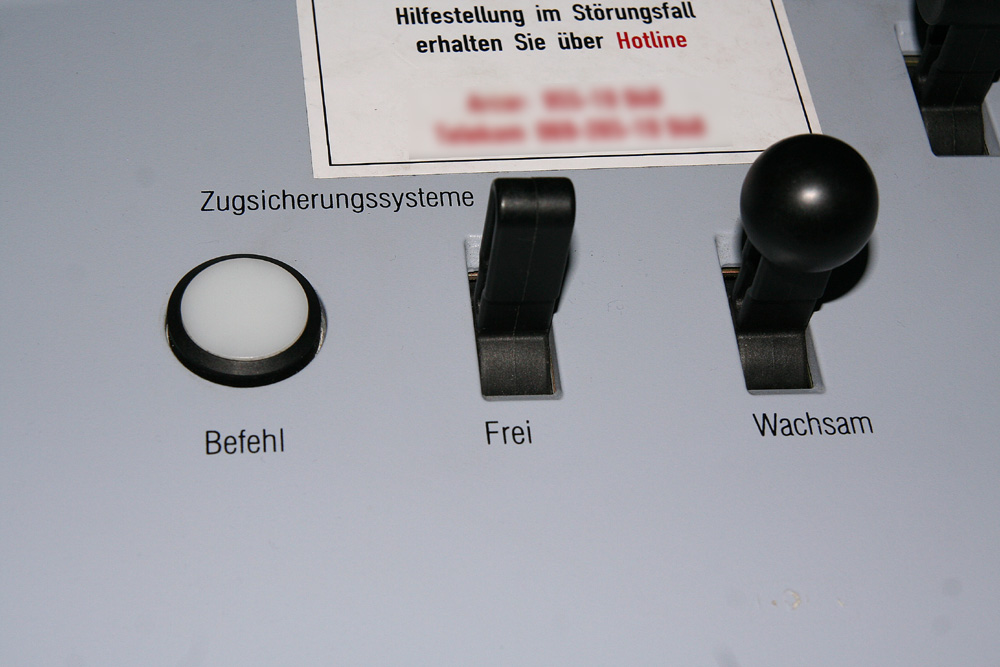
PZB buttons – command ("Befehl"), release ("Frei"), vigilance ("Wachsam")

If a train overruns a stop signal it will hit a 2000-Hz inductor that immediately activates an emergency stop (unless overridden, see below). Based on the overlap after the stop signal the train can be safely halted. Because of the different mass and braking capability of each train this can only be asserted based on a given maximum speed that must be maintained at the point of the red signal.

The original Indusi protocol was placing a 2000 Hz inductor at every visual main signal that could show a red signal for an immediate stop. If the train driver overruns the red signal then an emergency stop is enforced unconditionally. The 1000 Hz inductor is a conditional restriction that is commonly placed at every distant signal that could show a yellow signal pointing to a following red signal – in the original Indusi protocol the train driver has to acknowledge the bell ring within 4 seconds or the train will be halted automatically. Based on the yellow signal the train driver is required to lower the speed to allow the overlap after the stop signal to be enough to halt the train safely. An Indusi system with a speed limiter (at least since I60R) would enforce a maximum speed after a given time in that situation with the maximum speed depending on the type of train. The 500 Hz is commonly found near railway stations or shortly before a main signal – it activates a lower speed limit than the 1000 Hz inductor. Since the visual signals may switch off while the train is moving, i.e. no red signal anymore after crossing a yellow signal, the train driver can release the train from the enforced speed restrictions using a button allowing to accelerate to the free section ahead.

=== Speed traps ===
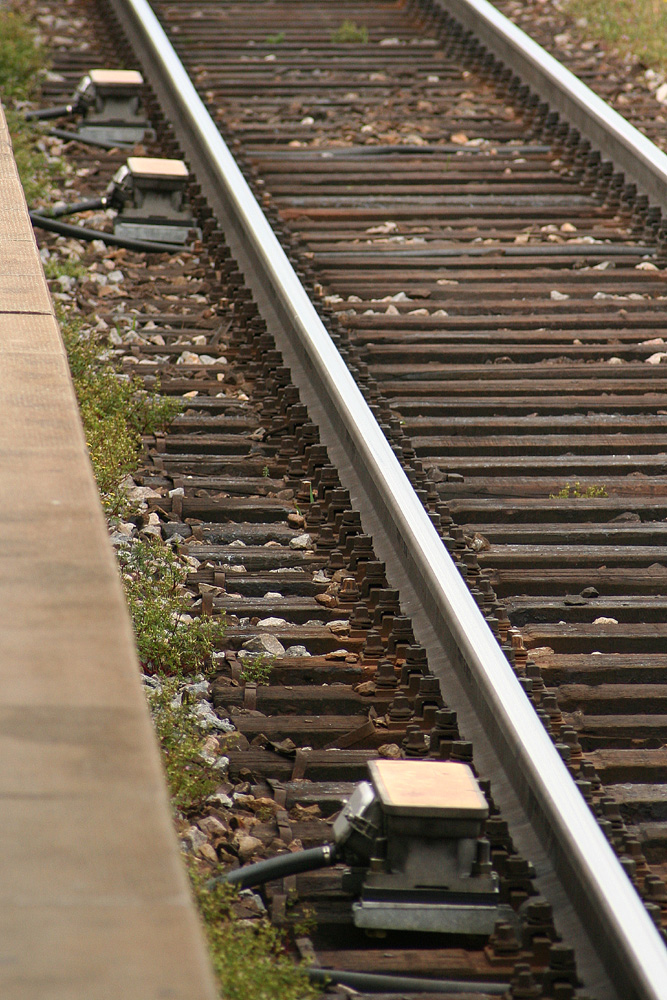
A German speed trap with three inductors: Upper: Detector before trap, starts timer once train is detected and disables the middle PZB inductor after a certain amount of time. Middle: 1000 or 2000 Hz PZB inductor (depending on signaled speed). Lower: Detector after trap; re-enables the middle PZB inductor.

Speed limits higher than 70 km/h cannot be enforced using permanent 1000 Hz inductors, as this would slow down most or all trains much below the speed limit. Therefore, two kinds of speed traps are used to enforce these limits. Both types work similar: Once a train is detected, they will disable the connected 1000 or 2000 Hz inductor after a certain time. Depending on train's speed, the train will pass the inductor at active or inactive state.

- Speed limit 80 or 90 km/h: The speed trap uses a 1000 Hz inductor and is located at the distant signal. If train passes the speed trap with more than signaled speed + 15 km/h (i.e., 95 or 105 km/h), it will capture a 1000 Hz influence, which the train driver has to acknowledge (and brake to 55/70/85 km/h).
- Speed limit 100 to 140 km/h: The speed trap uses a 2000 Hz inductor and is located several hundreds of meters before the main signal. If a train passes it with more than signaled speed + 10-20 km/h (exact distance and difference depending on signaled speed), it will be tripped.

A speed trap, regardless of its type, is officially called Geschwindigkeitsprüfabschnitt (GPA; "speed check section") or Geschwindigkeitsüberwachungseinrichtung (GÜ, "speed supervision device").

=== Operation ===
The details of operation have changed over time and the later PZB systems allow more granular speed restrictions. The basic part of the operation scheme (German "Betriebsprogramm") of the PZB90 protocol does still use the three inductor types as seen in the following picture. The diagram shows the speed (German "Geschwindigkeit" in km/h) in accordance with the braking distance (German "Bremsweg" in meter) before and after a main signal (placed at the 2000 Hz point).

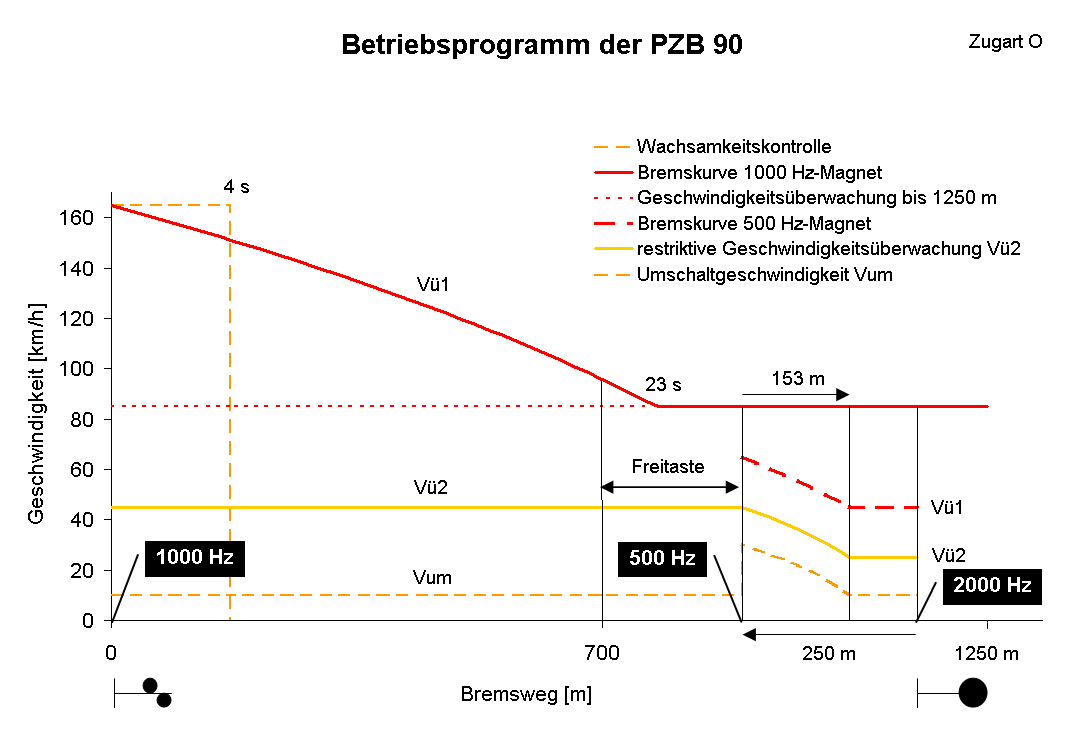

A train driver may pass across a stop signal if it has been mandated by the station director for example during a system fault, or it is being allowed by a replacement signal (German "Ersatzsignal") or a caution signal (German "Vorsichtsignal"). The train driver needs to push and hold the command button (German "Befehlstaste") while moving over the active 2000 Hz inductor – while the button is pressed a constant audible warning (bell and speech) is raised and the use of the command button is registered on the train recorder. While using the command button the maximum speed of the train is limited to 40 km/h.

== Deployment ==
=== Germany ===
The German EBO railway regulations requires PZB on all but very minor lines. Since 1998 all traction vehicles must be equipped with Indusi in Germany – before that it was possible for trains without a protection system to use PZB-enabled lines up to a speed of 100 km/h. The change of allowance guidelines of the EBO did require about 800 vehicles from the former Deutsche Reichsbahn to be either retrofitted or scrapped.

=== Slovenia ===
An Indusi I-60 system is employed on all main railway lines in Slovenia.

=== Croatia ===
An Indusi I-60 system is employed on all mainline lines in Croatia. PZB is required for speeds over 100 km/h.

=== Bosnia-Herzegovina ===
An Indusi I-60 system is employed on some railway lines in Bosnia-Herzegovina. Many line devices are damaged or stolen during Bosnian war 1992 – 1995.

=== Serbia ===
An Indusi I-60 system is employed on all mainline lines in Serbia, but due to malfunctioning of the PZB devices many lines are limited to 100 km/h running.

=== Montenegro ===
An Indusi I-60 system is employed on all mainline lines in Montenegro.

=== Romania ===
An Indusi I-60 system identical to the German one is equipped on all standard-gauge railways in Romania, including the lines M1 and M3 of the Bucharest Metro. The Romanian rail regulator, AFER, requires all locomotives, EMUs and DMUs operating on public infrastructure to be equipped with Indusi systems.

=== Canada ===
In Ottawa, Canada, OC Transpo's O-Train Trillium Line originally used German-built Bombardier Talent trains equipped with Indusi. When the line was upgraded in 2013, the new Alstom Coradia LINT trains were also fitted with Indusi. As part of the Stage 2 expansion, the Indusi equipment was removed. As part of a full signalling renewal, Siemens Mobility will equip the line and rolling stock with a new continuous automatic train protection (ATP) system.

=== Saudi Arabia ===
Indusi I-60 is installed on the Mecca Metro for train protection in manual (fall-back)mode.

=== United Kingdom ===
A version of Indusi is installed on the Tyne and Wear Metro network for train protection; its 1970s-built trains were largely based on German designs. On the Metro extension to Sunderland, Indusi has been installed on the Network Rail tracks, because it does not interfere with NR's TPWS signalling system.

=== Israel ===
Israel Railways utilizes Indusi (I 60R) supplied by Thales throughout its network. Beginning in 2018, the Indusi system is scheduled to be replaced by ETCS Level 2 signalling in stages.

=== Hungary ===
PZB is installed on the Sopron–Szombathely and Szombathely–Körmend–Szentgotthárd lines operated by GySEV. These lines are directly connected to the Austrian railway network and, as a consequence, trains otherwise not equipped with the Hungarian EVM or EÉVB may also use these lines.

== Accidents ==
The Indusi system has been relatively safe; however there have been two accidents that led to the creation of the PZB90 restrictive mode. One is the Rüsselsheim train disaster of 2 February 1990 – an S-Bahn rapid transit train left the station at such a speed that the automatic train stop was not able to bring the train to a halt before the next switch where another train was just crossing over. Being fully packed during rush hour the accident resulted in 17 deaths and 145 severely wounded. Another accident that led to the introduction of the PZB90 system was the Garmisch-Partenkirchen train collision, when a RegioExpress from Innsbruck to Munich collided into a touristic train, because the driver of the RE train departed with false permission against a red signal.

There had been at least one major accident with the PZB90 in place – on 26 June 2000 an S-Bahn train left Hannover-Langenhagen station for a single-track section with an oncoming train. The PZB halted the train but the driver released the train ("Freitaste") without double-checking with the train director. The investigative report notes that there had been 22 similar recorded occurrences until that time when a driver related the PZB halt to a different cause than having overrun a main signal – the report concludes that the operations manual should be changed in that double-checking with train director should not only be required on a main signal overrun but explicitly on all PZB-related stops.

The 2011 Saxony-Anhalt train collision is related to PZB in that the track was not equipped with any automatic train stop system. In the modernisation program of the mid 1990s it deemed sufficient to deploy PZB90 only on tracks rated for speeds of 100 km/h (62 mph) and beyond. This would allow some local railways to keep up with their normal operations when they had no need for their rolling stock to run on any main line. After the accident Deutsche Bahn promised to check all single-track lines so that they are either equipped with PZB or FFB (Funkfahrbetrieb – radio-controlled operation). The German legislature has enacted a requirement that most of the remaining minor railway tracks need to be upgraded with an automatic train stop by 1 December 2014.

== See also ==
- Intermittent Inductive Automatic Train Stop
