= TWR 71-000 series =

Japanese electric multiple unit train type

Tokyo Waterfront Area Rapid Transit 71-000 series
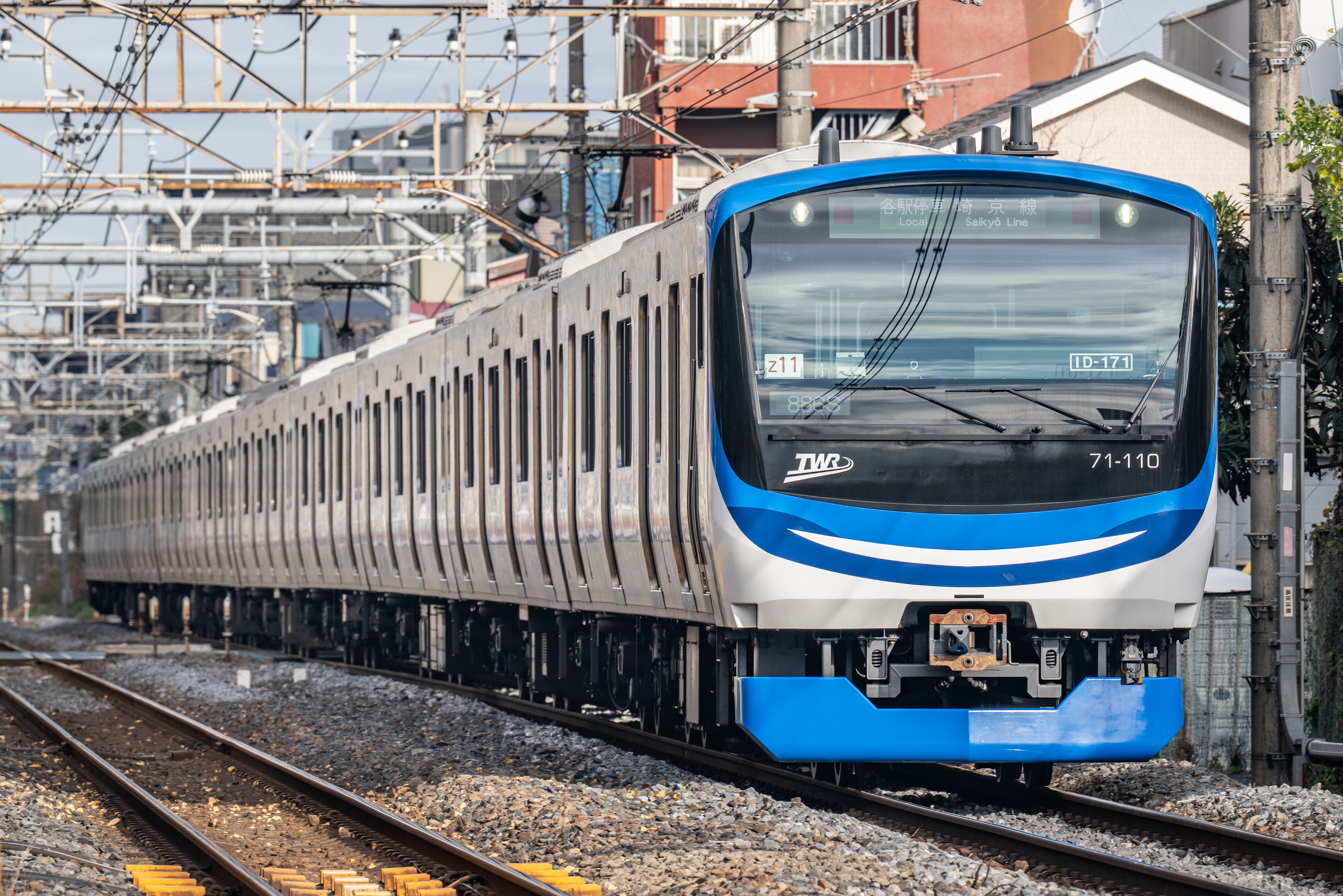
- A 71-000 series set in December 2025
- In service: 2025–present
- Manufacturer: J-TREC
- Family name: Sustina S24 Series
- Replaced: 70-000 series
- Entered service: 1 October 2025
- Number under construction: 60 vehicles (6 sets)
- Number built: 20 vehicles (2 sets)
- Formation: 10 cars per trainset
- Fleet numbers: Z11–
- Capacity: 1544 (486 seated)
- Operator: Tokyo Waterfront Area Rapid Transit
- Depot: Yashio
- Lines served: Rinkai Line; Saikyō Line; ■ Kawagoe Line

Specifications
- Car body construction: Stainless steel
- Car length: 20,000 mm (65 ft 7 in)
- Width: 2,998 mm (9 ft 10.0 in)
- Height: 4,016.5 mm (13 ft 2.13 in)
- Floor height: 1,130 mm (3 ft 8 in)
- Doors: 4 pairs per side
- Maximum speed: 120 km/h (75 mph); 100 km/h (62 mph) (Rinkai Line)
- Traction system: IGBT–VVVF
- Traction motors: Three-phase induction motor
- Power output: 140 kW (190 hp)
- Acceleration: 2.5 km/(h⋅s) (1.6 mph/s)
- Deceleration: 5 km/(h⋅s) (3.1 mph/s)
- Electric systems: 1,500 V DC (overhead catenary)
- Current collection: Pantograph
- Bogies: TS-1050 (motored); TS-1051 (Note: End cars only) and TS-1051A (trailer)
- Braking system: Regenerative brake
- Safety systems: ATS-P, ATC
- Track gauge: 1,067 mm (3 ft 6 in)

Notes/references
- Specifications

The Tokyo Waterfront Area Rapid Transit 71‑000 series (東京臨海高速鉄道71‑000形) is an electric multiple unit (EMU) commuter train type operated by the third-sector railway operator Tokyo Waterfront Area Rapid Transit (TWR) since 2025. A total of eight 10-car sets are to be built to replace the fleet of 70-000 series sets used on the Rinkai Line since its opening in 1996.

== Design ==
Based on the JR East E233 series design, the 71‑000 series is built by Japan Transport Engineering Company (J-TREC) as part of its "Sustina S24 Series" family of 20-meter-long four-door cars. The type uses a wide-body design to reduce congestion.

== Formation ==
Sets are based at Yashio Depot and are formed as follows with six motored ("M") cars and four non-powered trailer ("T") cars.

	← Shin-Kiba Ōsaki, Ōmiya, Kawagoe →									
Car No.	10	9	8	7	6	5	4	3	2	1
Designation	Tc	M1	M1'	T2	M3	M3'	T1	M2	M2'	Tc'
Numbering	71-x10	71-x09	71-x08	71-x07	71-x06	71-x05	71-x04	71-x03	71-x02	71-x01
Weight (t)	31.1	32.3	33.1	29.1	32.2	30.2	29.4 (Note: 29.7 t for cars with rail lubricating device)	32.9	33.1	31.3
Capacity (total/seated)	140/39	158/51	158/51	158/51	158/51	158/51	158/51	158/51	158/51	140/39

- Cars 6 and 9 have one pantograph, and car 3 has two.
- All cars have a wheelchair space.

== Interior ==
Passenger accommodation consists of longitudinal seating throughout.

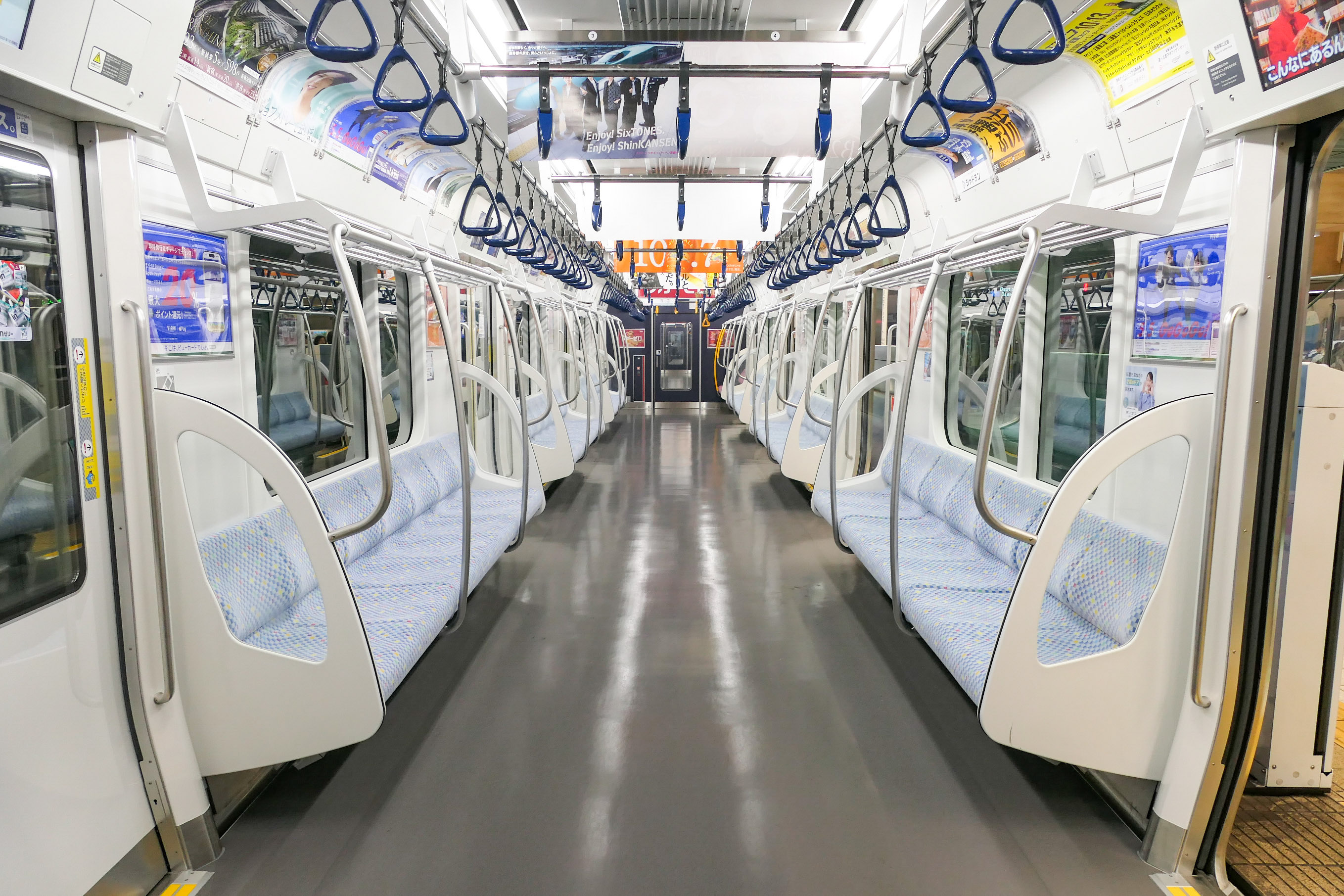
Interior view in October 2025

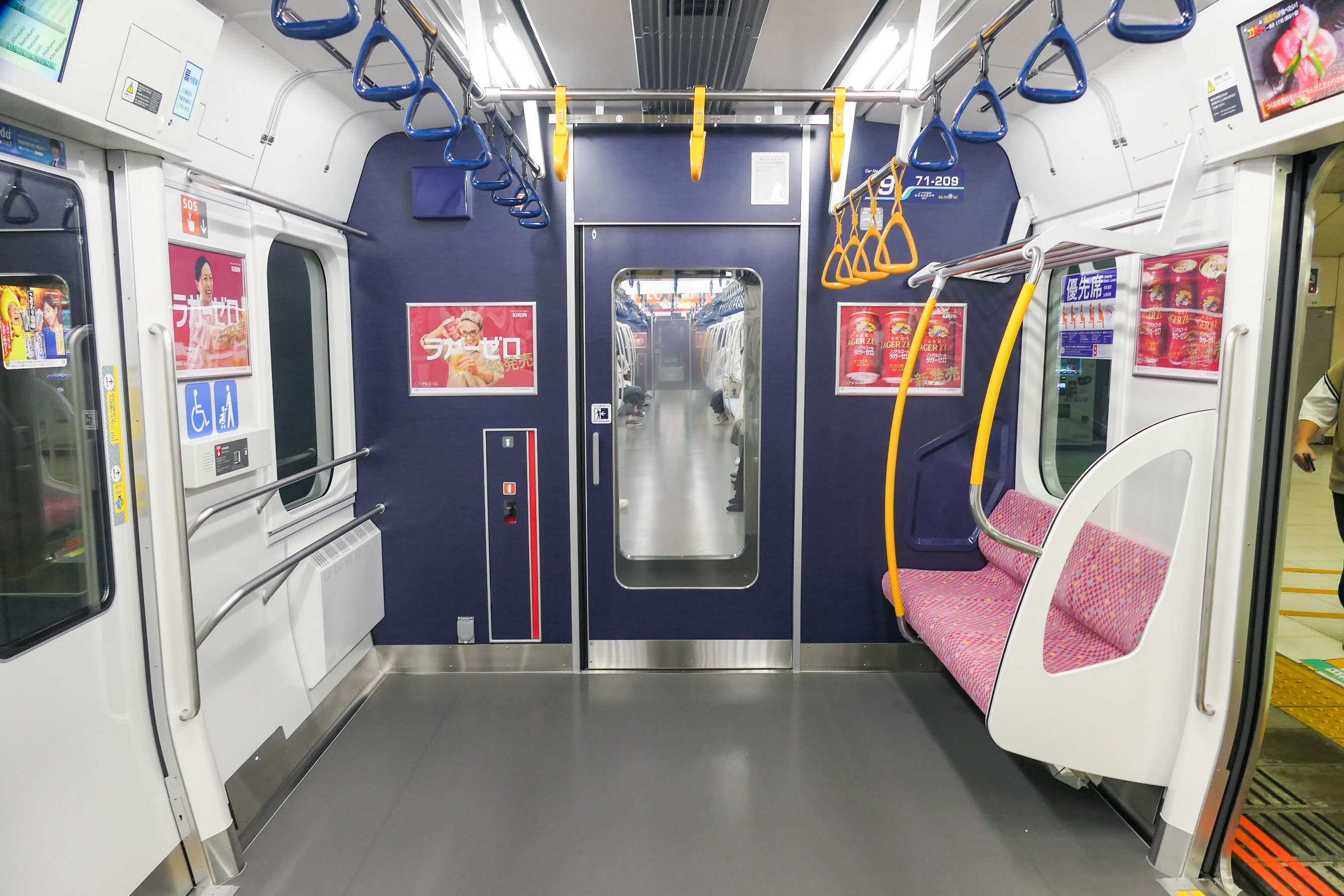
Wheelchair space and priority seating in October 2025

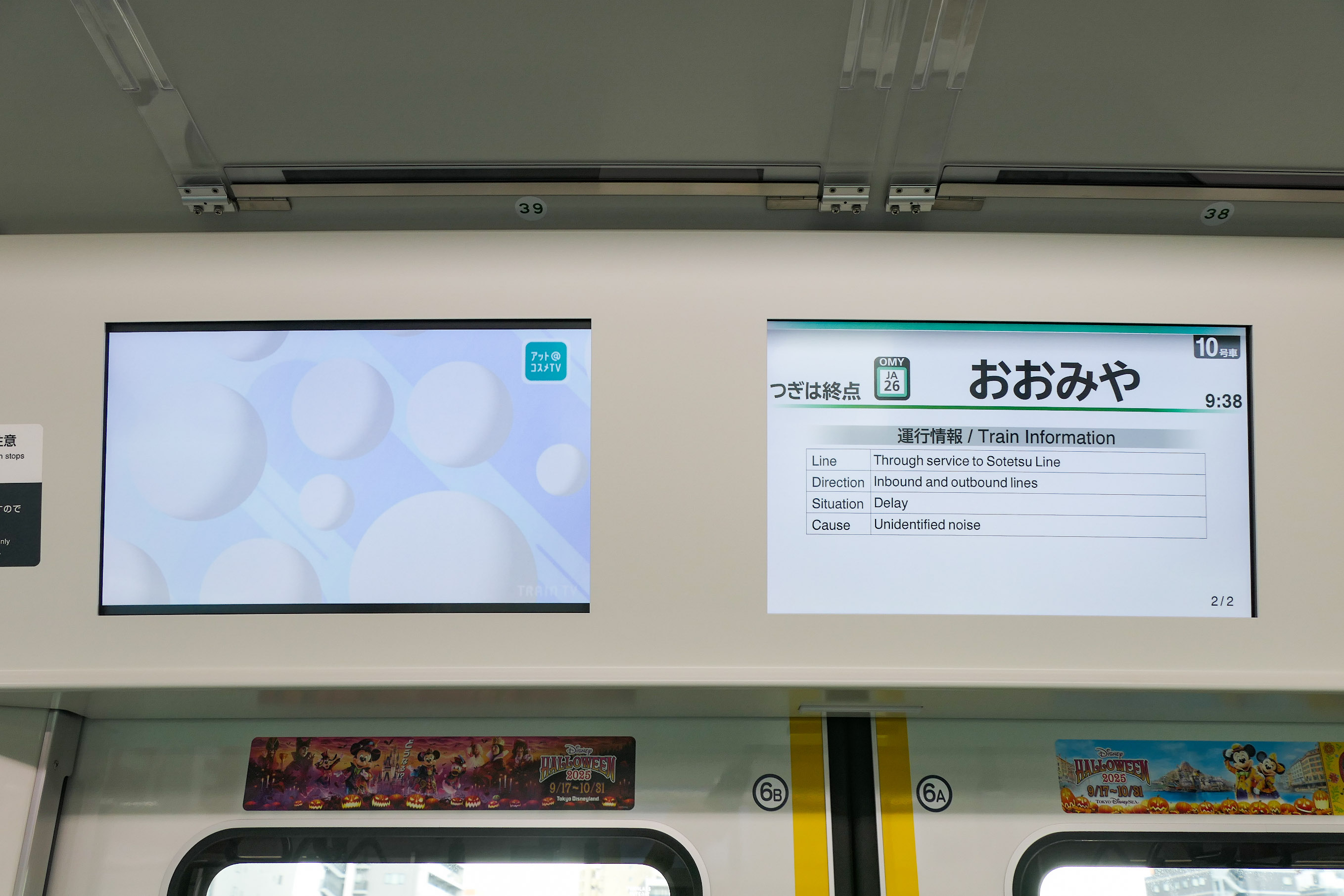
LCD passenger information displays in October 2025

== History ==
Details of the trains were announced by TWR in November 2023. A total of eight 10-car sets are due to be in service by fiscal 2027.

The first train was delivered from the J-TREC plant in Niitsu in November 2024. Set Z12 followed suit in June 2025.

The 71-000 series fleet entered service on the Rinkai, Saikyō and Kawagoe lines from 1 October 2025.
