= Intermittent inductive automatic train stop =

Rail signaling equipment

The intermittent inductive automatic train stop (also referred to as IIATS or just automatic train stop or ATS) is a train protection system used in North American mainline railroad and rapid transit systems. It makes use of magnetic reluctance to trigger a passing train to take some sort of action. The system was developed in the 1920s by the General Railway Signal Company as an improvement on existing mechanical train stop systems and saw limited adoption before being overtaken by more advanced cab signaling and automatic train control systems. The system remains in use after having been introduced in the 1920s.

== Overview ==
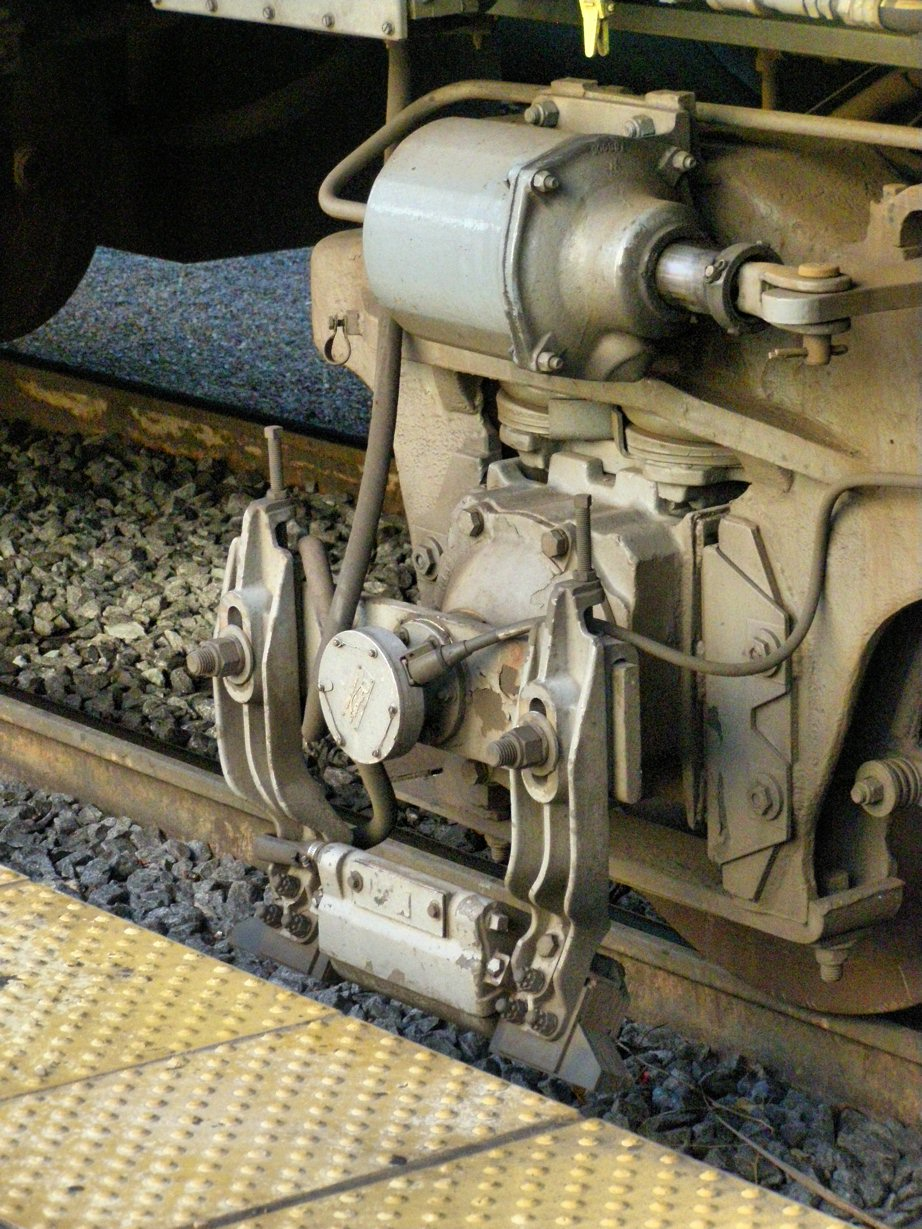
IIATS pickup on the leading truck of a San Diego Coaster F40PH

The technology works by having the state of a track mounted shoe read by a receiver mounted to a truck on the leading locomotive or car. In the standard implementation the shoe is mounted to the ties a few inches outside the right hand running rail, although in theory the shoe could be mounted anywhere on the ties. The system is binary with the shoe presenting either an on or off state to the receiver. In order to be failsafe when the shoe is energized it presents an off state to the receiver, while the non-energized state presents an on state which triggers an action. This allows things like permanent speed restrictions or other hazards to be protected by non-active devices.

The receiver consists of a two coil electromagnet carefully aligned to pass about 1.5 inches above the surface of the inductor shoe. The inductor shoe consists of two metal plates set into a streamlined housing designed to deflect impacts of debris or misaligned receivers. The metal plates are connected through a choke circuit in the body of the shoe. When the choke circuit is open magnetic flux in the receiver's primary coil is able to induce a voltage in the receiver's secondary coil which in turn triggers an action in the locomotive. When the circuit is closed the choke eliminates the magnetic field and the voltage induced by it allowing the locomotive to pass without activation. Where unconditional activation was desired specially shaped metal plates could be used in place of a fully functional shoe, however the design of the system can result in accidental activations when the train passes over switches or other metal objects in the track area.

The most common use case for the ATS system was to alert the railroad engineer of an impending hazard and if the alert was not acknowledged, stop the train by means of a full service application of the brakes. When attached to signals the shoe would be energized when the signal was displaying a clear indication. Any other signal indication would de-energize the shoe and trigger an alarm in the cab. If the engineer did not cancel the alarm within 5–8 seconds a penalty brake application would be initiated and could not be reset until the train came to a complete stop. Unlike mechanical train stops or other train stop systems, IIATS was not generally used to automatically stop a train if it passed a stop signal and in practice could not be used for this purpose as the shoes were placed only a few feet from the signal they protected and would not present sufficient braking distance for the train to stop.

On bi-directionally signaled lines two shoes would be needed, one for each direction of travel as locomotives would only have a sensor to detect the shoes on one side of the train. The receivers can also be designed for easy removal to prevent damage when operating in non-equipped territory or to cut costs when only a small portion of the railroad requires ATS equipped locomotives. Inert inductors are sometimes placed in advance of certain speed restrictions as an alert or at engine terminals to test the functionality of the ATS system.

On a few light rail lines IIATS has been employed in a manner similar to mechanical train stops, stopping the train if it passes an absolute stop signal. It is useful where light rail shares tracks with mainline railroad trains as mechanical trips may be damaged by or interfere with freight operations and because light rail vehicles can be brought to a stop much more quickly than a mainline railroad train without requiring complex signal overlaps

== Use ==
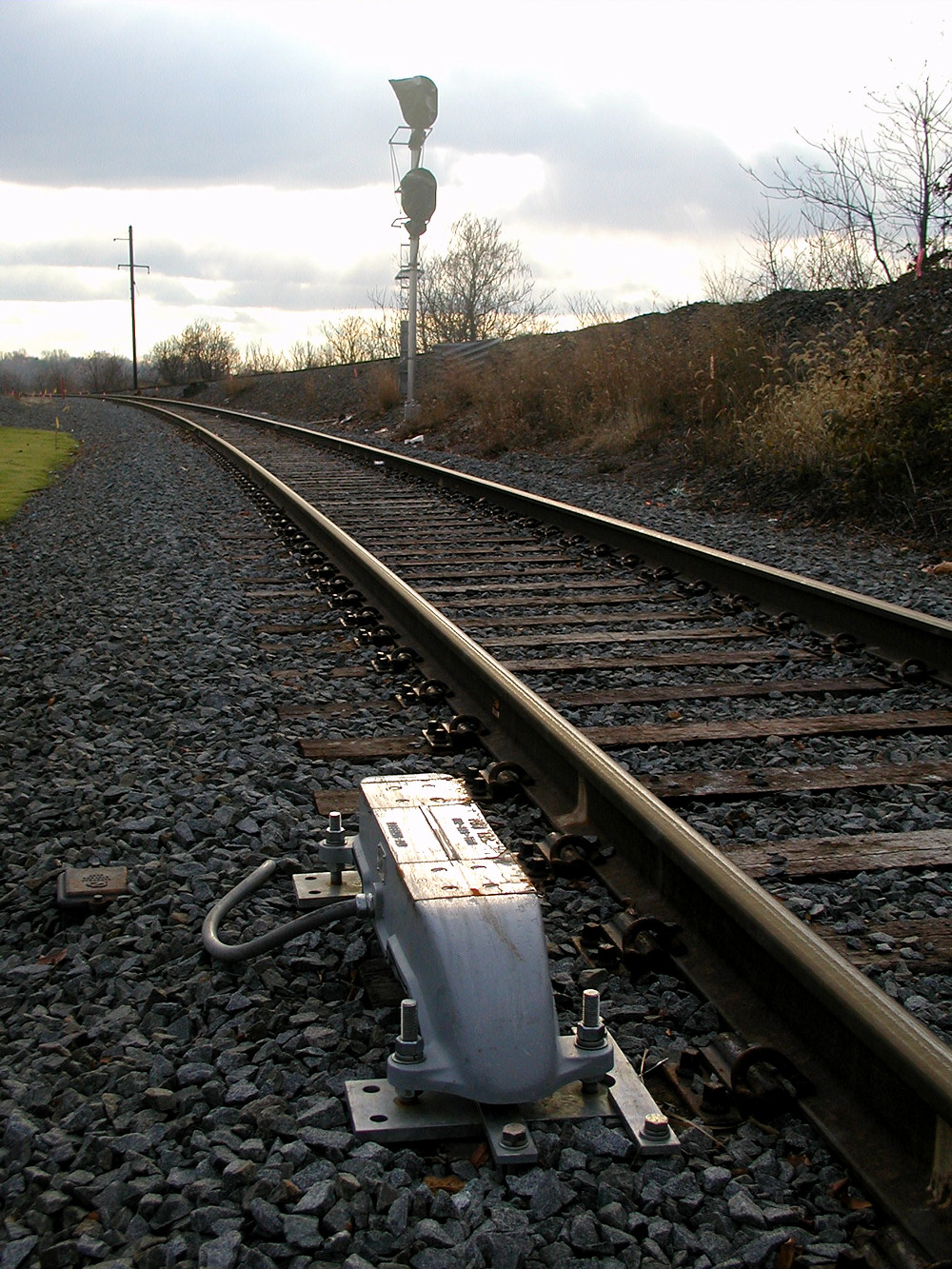
IIATS shoe in service on the NJT RiverLINE to enforce absolute stops at interlockings

Starting in the 1930s the US Interstate Commerce Commission, in its role as a federal railroad regulator, encouraged railroads to adopt new safety technologies to decrease the rate of railroad accidents. IIATS was offered by the General Railway Signal Company of Rochester, NY as one such technology and it was adopted by the New York Central railroad for use on its high speed Water Level Route between New York and Chicago and on a number of other lines. The Southern Railway also chose to adopt ATS on most of its main lines eventually covering 2700 route miles. In addition the Chicago and North Western Railway installed the system on some of its Chicago area commuter lines.

After the Naperville train disaster caused by a missed signal, the ICC required additional technical safety systems for any train traveling at or above 80 mph with the rule taking effect in 1951. Those railroads still interested in high speed operations IIATS met the minimum ICC requirements with a lower cost compared to other cab signaling or automatic train control systems, however with rail travel facing increased competition from cars and airplanes most railroads simply choose to accept the new speed limit. Only the Atchison, Topeka and Santa Fe choose to fully equip its Chicago to Los Angeles and Los Angeles to San Diego main lines in support of the Super Chief and other premier high speed trains.

IIATS installations reached their peak in 1954 with a total of 8650 road miles, 14400 track miles, and 3850 locomotives equipped with the system. However, with the collapse of long-distance passenger rail travel and the general North American railroad industry malaise in 1971, the bankrupt Penn Central was permitted to remove IIATS from its Water Level Route along with the Southern and other railroads with test or pilot IIATS systems. Even the ATSF and successor BNSF were gradually allowed by regulators to remove IIATS from parts of previously equipped lines due to the reduced passenger traffic. At the dawn of the 21st century the only IIATS equipped lines were the MetroLink and Coaster line between San Diego and Fullerton, parts of the former ATSF Super Chief route in California, Arizona, New Mexico, Colorado, Kansas and Missouri and the former Chicago and North Western Railway North Line, Northwest Line out of Chicago operated by Union Pacific on behalf of Metra

When the NJ Transit River Line opened in 2004 it featured a new IIATS system. This is a light rail systems running on shared track with main line freight traffic and IIATS is used to enforce a full stop at equipped signals instead of as a warning system.

== See also ==
- Indusi
- Automatic warning system
- Le Crocodile
- Cab Signal System
