= Automatic train stop =

Class of vehicle protection systems for railways

Automatic train stop or ATS is a system on a train that automatically stops a train if certain situations occur (unresponsive train operator, earthquake, disconnected rail, train running over a stop signal, etc.) to prevent accidents. In some scenarios it functions as a type of dead man's switch. Automatic train stop differs from the concept of automatic train control in that ATS usually does not feature an onboard speed control mechanism.

== Overview ==
=== Mechanical systems ===
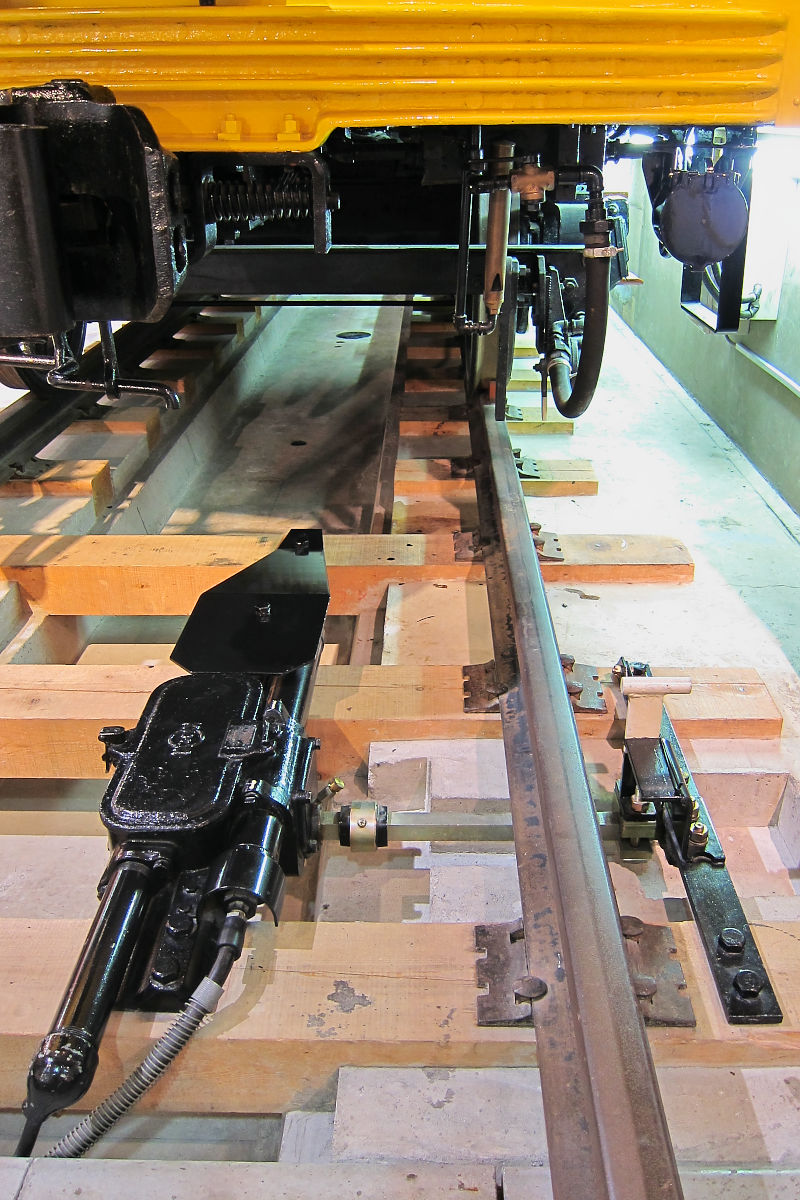
Preserved mechanically-operated ATS system formerly used on Tokyo Metro Ginza Line (installed 1927–1941, replaced with CS-ATC and TASC in 1993)

The invention of the fail-safe railway air brake provided an external means for stopping a train via a physical object opening a valve on the brake line to the atmosphere. Eventually known as train stops or trip stops, the first mechanical ATS system was installed in France in 1878 with some railroads in Russia following suit using a similar system in 1880. In 1901 Union Switch and Signal Company developed the first North American automatic train stop system for the Boston Elevated Railway. This system was soon adopted by the New York City Subway and other rapid transit systems in the United States.

Mechanical ATS was more popular on rapid transit systems and dedicated commuter rail than freight or long-distance passenger lines due to a combination of the increased complexity found in mainline railroad operations, the risk of inadvertent activation by debris or other wayside appliances, and the danger of emergency brake applications at high speeds. Moreover, the forces involved in a physical tripping action can begin to damage both the wayside and vehicle borne equipment at speeds over 70 miles per hour (110 km/h).

In 1910 the Pennsylvania and Long Island Rail Roads installed a mechanical ATS system covering various lines to New York Penn Station using the patented Hall trip valve which was designed to prevent inadvertent activations from debris, however the system was only installed on locomotives and multiple units traveling to Penn Station and did not see further adoption.

While similar in operation mechanical systems around the world are generally incompatible due to the wide variety of vehicle dimensions and track gauge which will result in the mechanical stopping devices not engaging the onboard valve.

=== Electronic systems ===
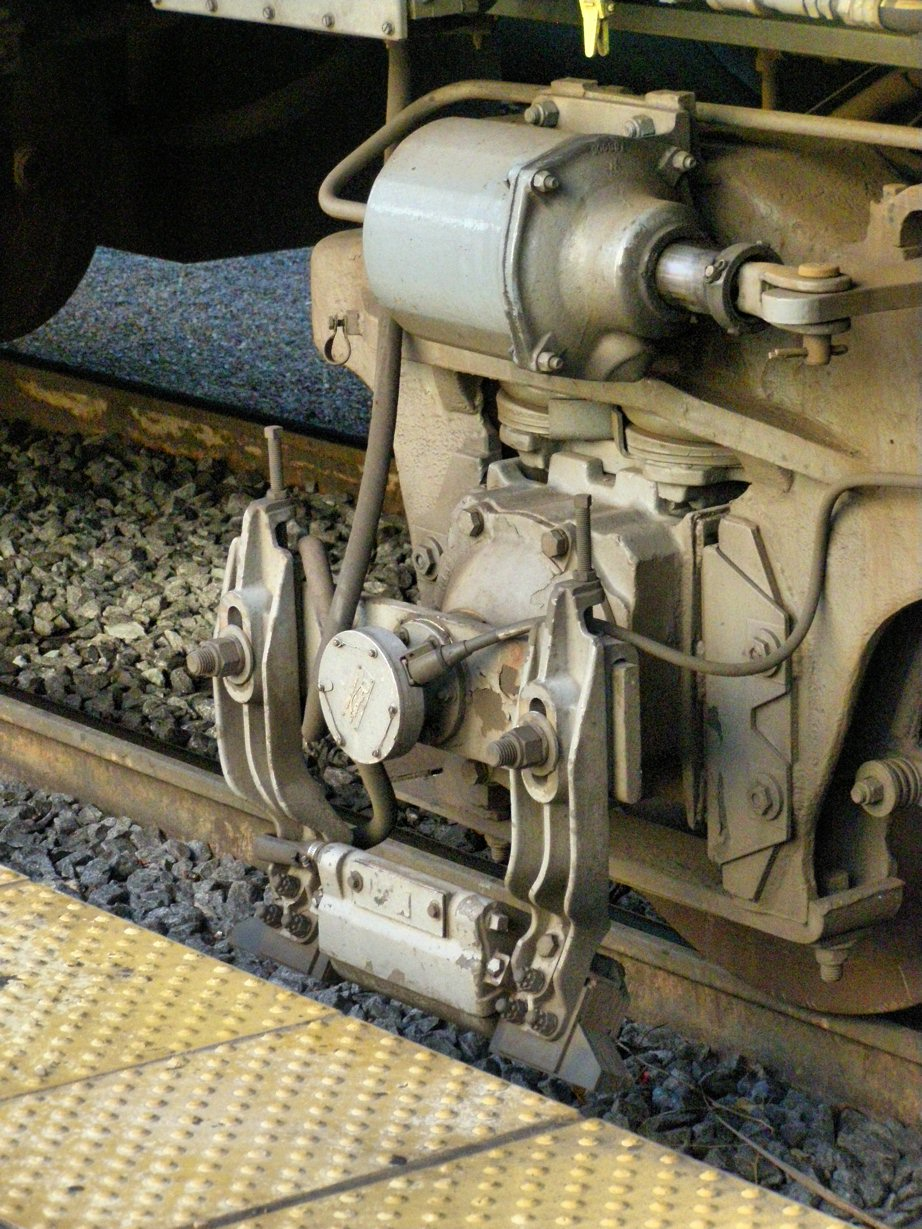
ATS pickup on the leading truck of a San Diego Coaster F40PH

Electronic systems make use of electric currents or electromagnetic fields to trigger some action in the locomotive cab. While mechanical systems were generally limited to venting the brake pipe and triggering an emergency stop, electronic systems can trigger other actions such as an acknowledgment from the driver, cutting power or a less severe application of the brakes. Without physical contact electronic systems could be used with higher speeds, limited only by the equipment's ability to sense the signal from stop devices.

The first such electronic system was Crocodile (train protection system) installed on French railways starting in 1872 which used an electrified contact rail to trigger an acknowledgment from the driver. If no such acknowledgment was made in 5 seconds the train would be stopped. In the UK the Great Western Railway implemented a similar system in 1906 dubbed Automatic Train Control that served as the template for the magnetic based Automatic Warning System, which ultimately replaced it starting in the 1950s.

In the United States, the General Railway Signal corporation introduced its Intermittent Inductive Automatic Train Stop system in the 1920s which made use of inductive loops in a "shoe" mounted outside of the running rails. This system was also of the acknowledgment type and was adopted by several railroads, continuing to see service as of 2013.

In 1954, Japan introduced ATS-B, the first known variant of ATS. In 1967, ATS-S (and its various supplements) was invented, the first non-contact-based ATS to be used; in 1974, ATS-P was used for the first time, and in 1986, H-ATS was invented.

== Usage around the world ==
=== United States ===
The majority of systems meeting the definition of Automatic Train Stop in the United States are mechanical trip stop systems associated with rapid transit lines built in the first half of the 20th century. Since 1951 ATS has been required by the Interstate Commerce Commission (later the Federal Railroad Administration) as a minimum safety requirement to allow passenger trains to exceed a speed limit of 79 mph (127 km/h). The regulatory requirement refers to a system that triggers an alert in the cab of the locomotive whenever the train passes a restrictive wayside signal and that then requires the locomotive engineer to respond to the alert within a set period of time before the brakes are automatically applied.

The most popular implementation of ATS for the mainline railroad industry was made by the General Railway Signal company starting in the 1920s and consisted of inductive coils mounted just outside the right hand rail in relation to the direction of travel. Often referred to as just ATS in railroad operating books, the full name of the system is Intermittent Inductive Automatic Train Stop to differentiate it from mechanical systems being offered at the time. The popularity of ATS as a train protection mechanism fell after the introduction of track coded cab signals in the 1930s.

==== ATS installations in the United States ====
System	Operator	Lines	In Service	Notes
Train stop	New York City Subway	A Division (IRT)	1904–present	Trips right
Train stop	New York City Subway	B Division (BMT and IND)	1915–present	Trips left
Train stop	Port Authority Trans-Hudson	System-wide	1908–present	Trips left
Train stop	SEPTA	Broad Street Subway	1928–present	Trips left
Train stop	SEPTA	Market–Frankford Line	?-present	Trips left, at wayside signals only
Train stop	MBTA	Blue Line	1925–present	Trips both
Train stop	MBTA	Orange Line	1901–present	Trips right, at wayside signals only
Train stop	MBTA	Red Line	1912–present	At wayside signals only
Train stop	Chicago Transit Authority	Chicago 'L'	?-present	Trips left, at wayside signals only
Train stop	Pennsylvania Railroad/Long Island Rail Road	New York Tunnel Extension	1911-?	Trips right, used Hall trip valves on trains
Train stop	Long Island Rail Road	Dunton to Flatbush Avenue	?-circa 1970	Trips right, used Hall trip valves on trains.
IIATS	BNSF Railway	Santa Fe Chicago to Los Angeles "Super Chief" Route	1930s-present	Parts of the route have had ATS removed
IIATS	Metrolink and Coaster	Former ATSF San Diego Main Line.	?-present	In service milepost 179 to 249.
IIATS	New York Central	New York to Chicago Water Level Route	1920s-1971	Removed by successor Penn Central
IIATS	Southern Railway	2700 route miles of main line.	1920s-1971	Removed in favor of increased CTC use.
IIATS	Union Pacific	Former Chicago & North Western North Line, Northwest Line	1952–2019	Used by Union Pacific on lines that also run Metra Commuter trains. Both freight and commuter locomotives must be equipped, with some exceptions.
IIATS	New Jersey Transit	RiverLINE	2003–present	Installed at interlockings only. Enforces Stop.
Westcab	Port Authority of Allegheny County	Pittsburgh Light Rail 42S Line from downtown to South Hills Village.	1985–present	Some overlap with an Automatic Train Control system installed on the Route 47 Line.

=== Japan ===
Many trains in Japan are equipped with this system. The ATS systems in Japan are slightly similar to those used in the United States, but are nowadays primarily transponder-based. The first mechanical ATS systems in Japan were introduced on the Tōkaidō Main Line in 1921, followed by the Tokyo Metro Ginza Line in 1927; but ATS did not become commonplace in the country until the late-1960s as a result of the Mikawashima train crash which occurred in 1962. Below is a list of ATS systems that are specific to Japan only:

==== JNR/JR Group ====
- ATS-B (also supplemented with S-type transponder; now obsolete since 2009)
- ATS-Dx (ATS using D-type transponder; always supplemented with: ATS-DF (JR Freight), ATS-DK (JR Kyushu) or ATS-DN (JR Hokkaido))
- ATS-S(x) (ATS using S-type transponder; always supplemented with: ATS-SF (JR Freight), ATS-SK (JR Kyushu), ATS-SM (Mizushima Rinkai Railway), ATS-SN (JR East and JR Hokkaido), ATS-SS (JR Shikoku), ATS-ST (JR Central) or ATS-SW (JR West), the last two letters corresponding to the type of transponder used with the S-type transponder)
- ATS-P (ATS using pattern renewal transponder; variants are ATS-PF (JR Freight), ATS-PN (Low-cost introduction type), ATS-PT (JR Central) and ATS-Ps (Frequency change cab signalling Type; used for e.g. on Senseki Line and Sendai Airport Line, and on operational steam trains))
- D-TAS (introduced by JR West in 2012; previously called ATS-M and ATS-DW during development)
- H-ATS (formerly used on the EF66 locomotive)
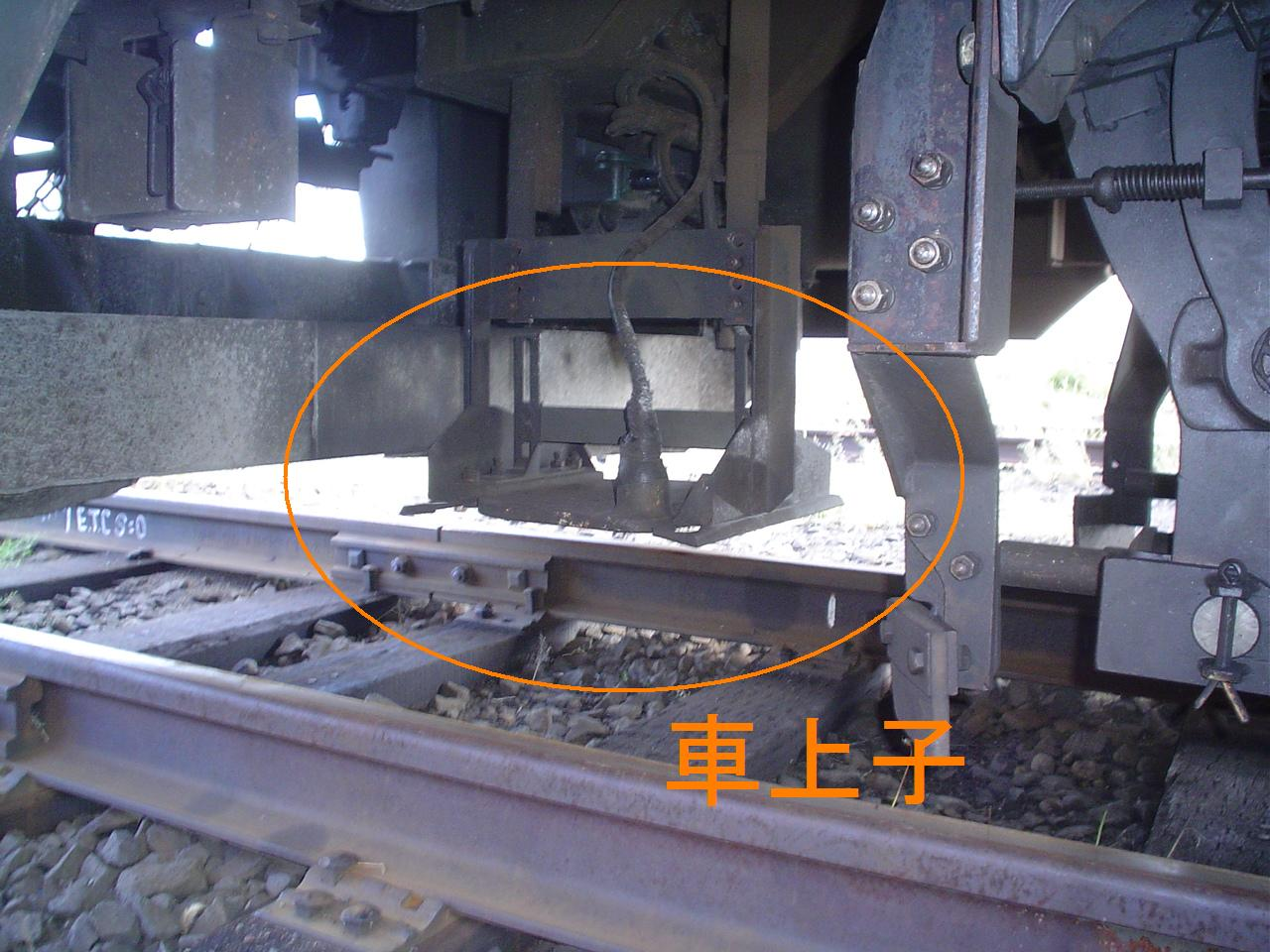
ATS pickup on the underside of a KiHa 183 series DMU

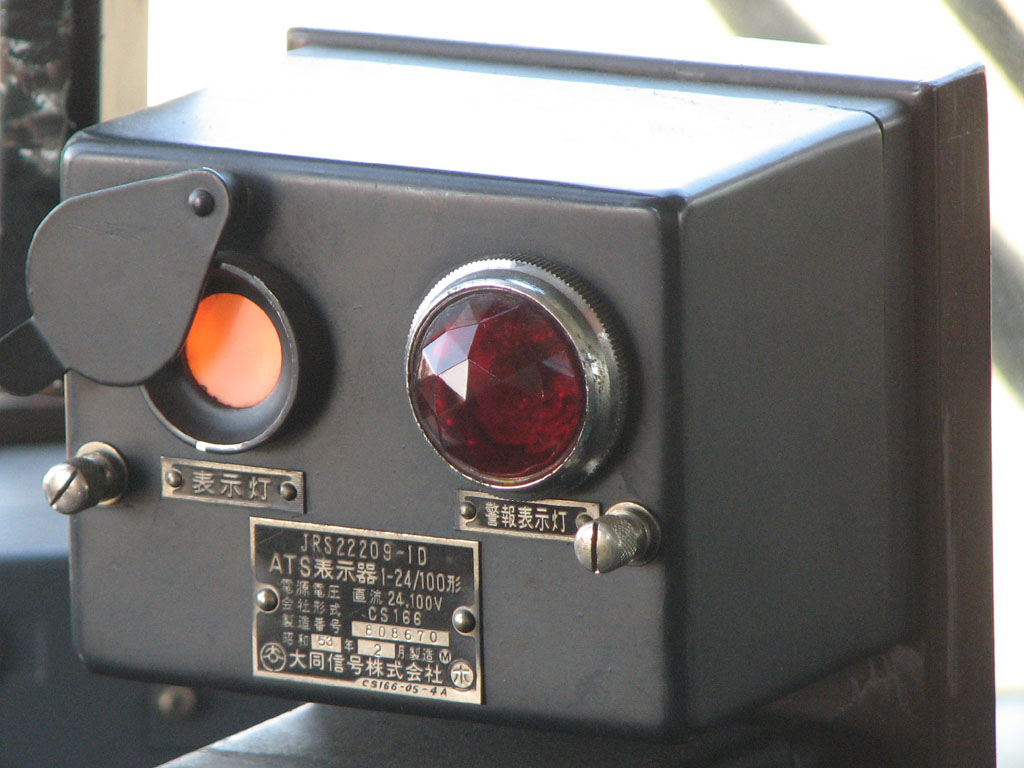
ATS-B light indicator on KiHa 59 series DMU

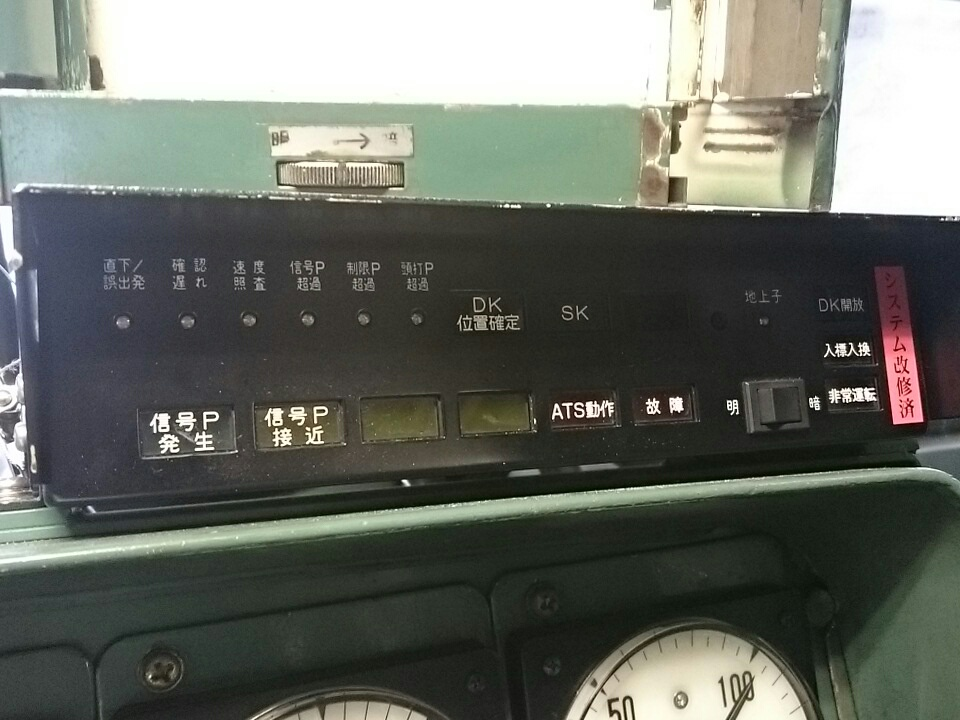
ATS-DK control panel

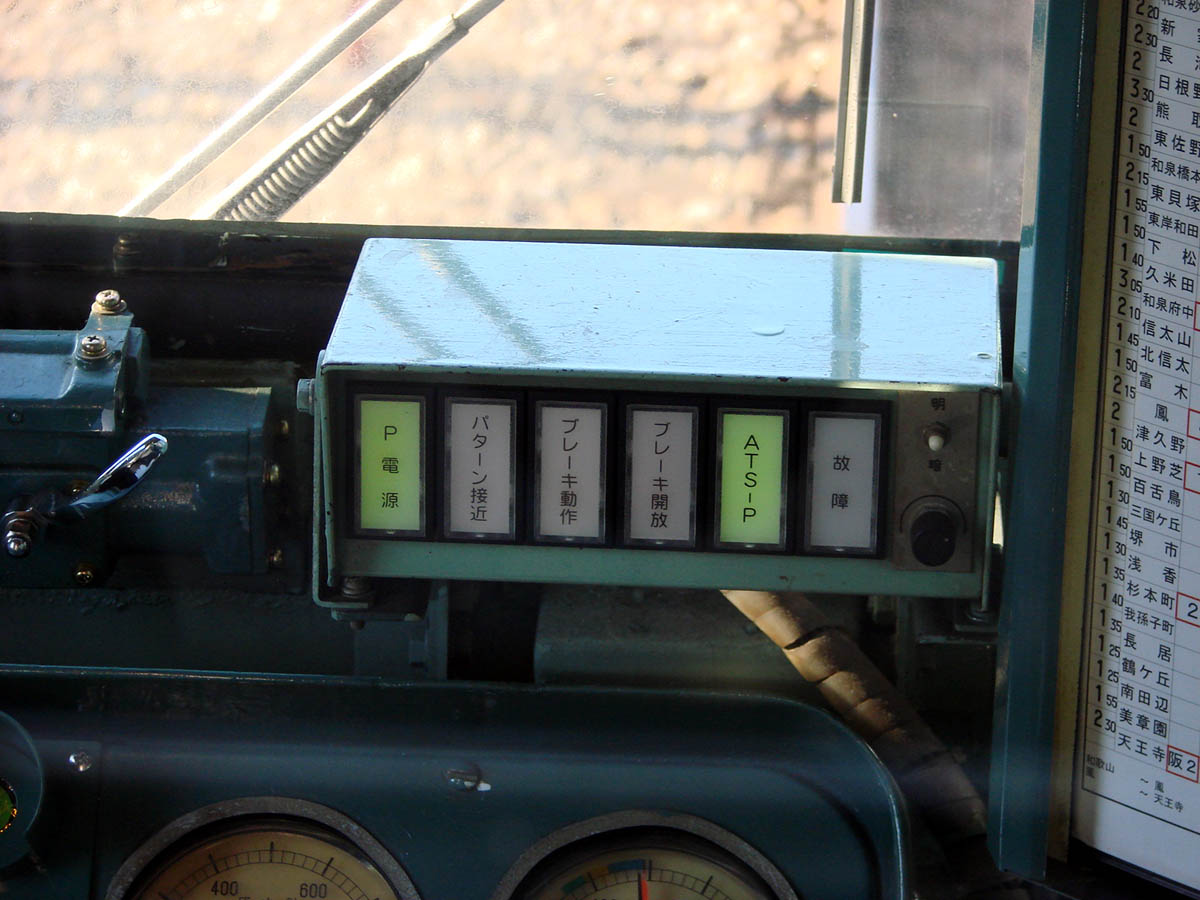
ATS-P indicator

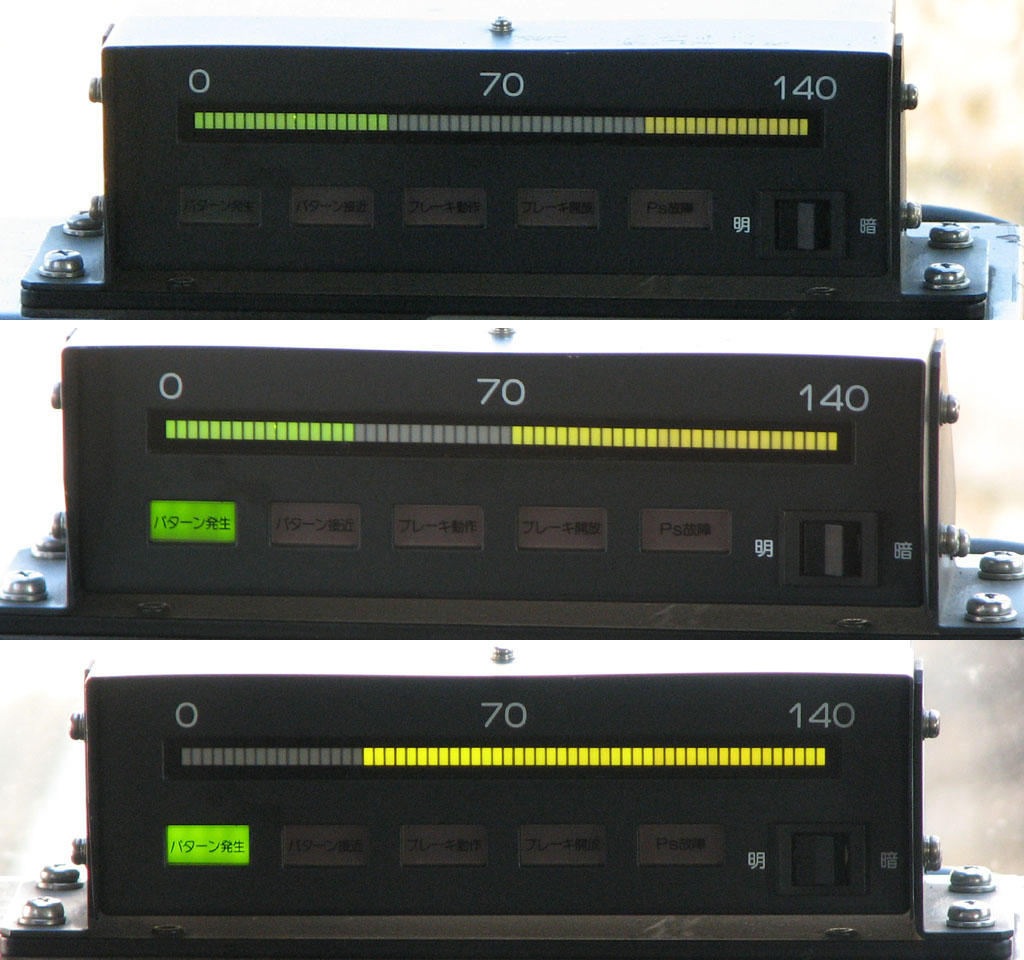
ATS-Ps cab signalling speed indicators on KiHa 59 series DMU

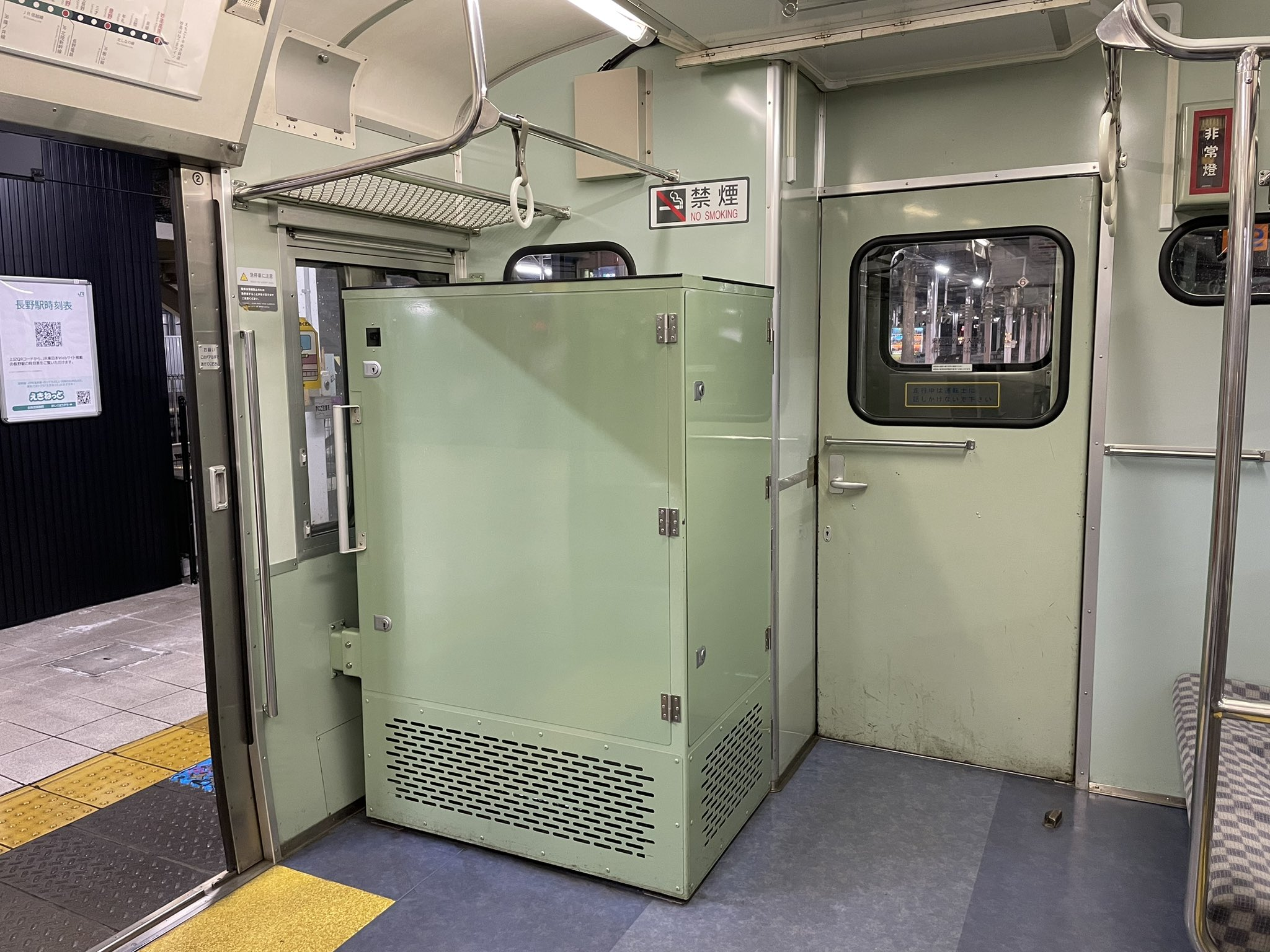
Retrofitted equipment cabinet for ATS-P and ATS-Ps on Shinano Railway 115 series

==== Private railways/Subway lines ====
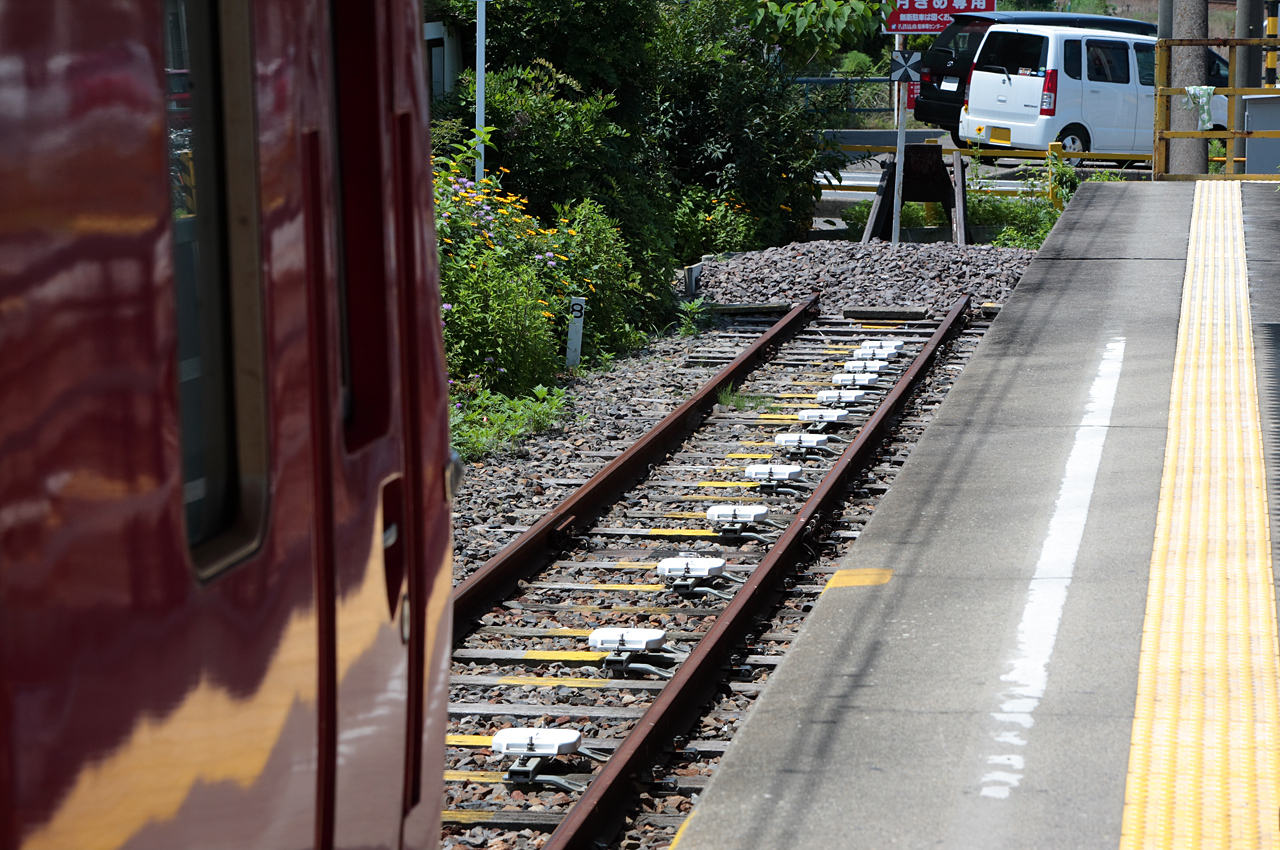
Meitetsu ATS transponders near a buffer stop at Saya Station. This transponder arrangement is similar in principle to "Moorgate control" used on the London Underground.

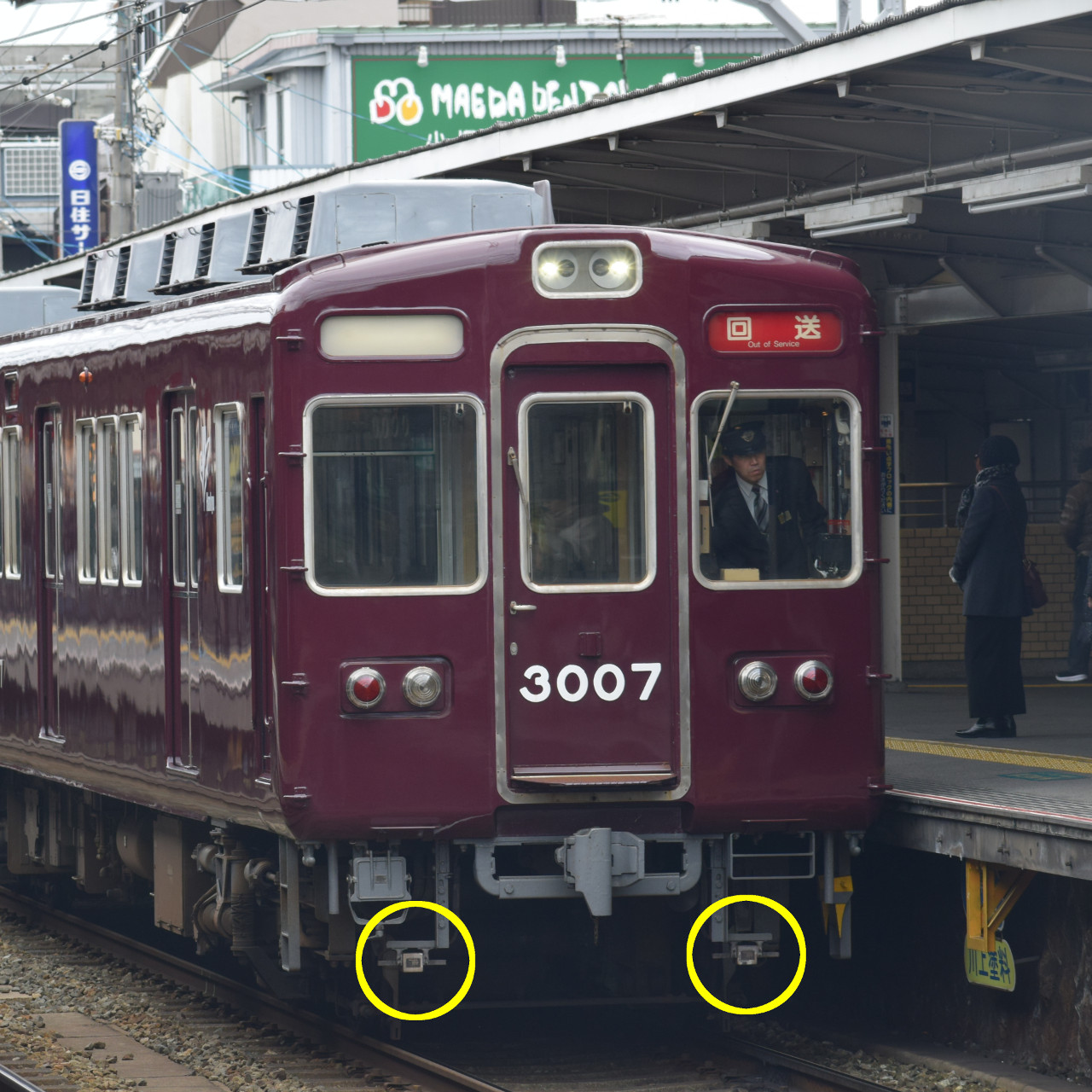
ATS pickups (yellow circles) on a Hankyu 3000 series train.

In addition, various private-sector railways and subway lines have adopted their own versions of the ATS system since the 1960s. Like the ATS systems used by the railways in the JR Group, they are transponder-based as well, but are generally incompatible with the ATS systems used by JR.

- C-ATS/ATS Type 1 (Used by Keikyu Corporation, Keisei Electric Railway, as well as on Hokusō Line, Narita Sky Access Line and Toei Asakusa Line)
- i-ATS (Used by Shizuoka Railway since 2007)
- K-ATS (Used by Keihan Electric Railway since 2015)
- Meitetsu ATS (M-ATS) (Used by Meitetsu)
- OM-ATS (formerly used by Odakyu Electric Railway)
- D-ATS-P (Digital ATS-P) (Used by Odakyu Electric Railway, not compatible with JR ATS-P)
- T-ATS (formerly used on Toei Mita Line, similar to Tobu ATS, replaced by ATC-P)
- Tobu ATS (TSP) (Used by Tobu Railway, except for the section of track between Ikebukuro and Ogawamachi on the Tobu Tojo Line)
- Hankyu Railway, Hanshin Electric Railway, Kintetsu, Sanyo Electric Railway, Seibu Railway and Tokyu Corporation (Ikegami/Tamagawa lines only) all use their own proprietary ATS systems.
- Sotetsu replaced own system to JR East's ATS-P.
- Keio Corporation replaced own system with ATC.

=== New Zealand ===
In Wellington only a few signals at a converging junction are fitted with mechanical ATS. All electric trains are fitted.

=== South Korea ===
Some Korail and subway lines are equipped with this system, as follows: Line 1, Line 4 (above ground section between Geumjeong and Oido stations), Suin-Bundang Line (between Gosaek and Incheon), Gyeongui-Jungang Line, and the Gyeongchun Line. The first ATS system in South Korea was installed on the Korail network in 1969, followed by Seoul Subway Line 1 in 1974 (similar to Japanese ATS-S).

=== Argentina ===
Buenos Aires Underground lines and have ATS equipped, while,, and have the more advanced Communications-based train control.

The Roca Line is ATS equipped in its electrified branches since 1985. Its ATS was provided by Japanese company Nippon Signal.

=== Taiwan ===
Many Taiwan Railways Administration trains are equipped with an Ericsson-developed ATS system since the late-1970s (similar to Japanese ATS-SN and ATS-P), which serve as fallback for a Bombardier-designed ATP system introduced in 2006 (equivalent to ETCS Level 1), of which the latter system replaced the older AWS system originally introduced in 1978 on the EMU100 and EMU200 express trains.

=== United Kingdom ===
The Manchester Metrolink uses ATS equipment between Timperley and Altrincham Interchange. This consists of electromagnetic beacons before the applicable signal. If a signal is passed at danger, the ATS device inside the tram will apply the track brakes. This system used to be universal along the system, but has been narrowed down to just this section because of recent resignalling to the system.

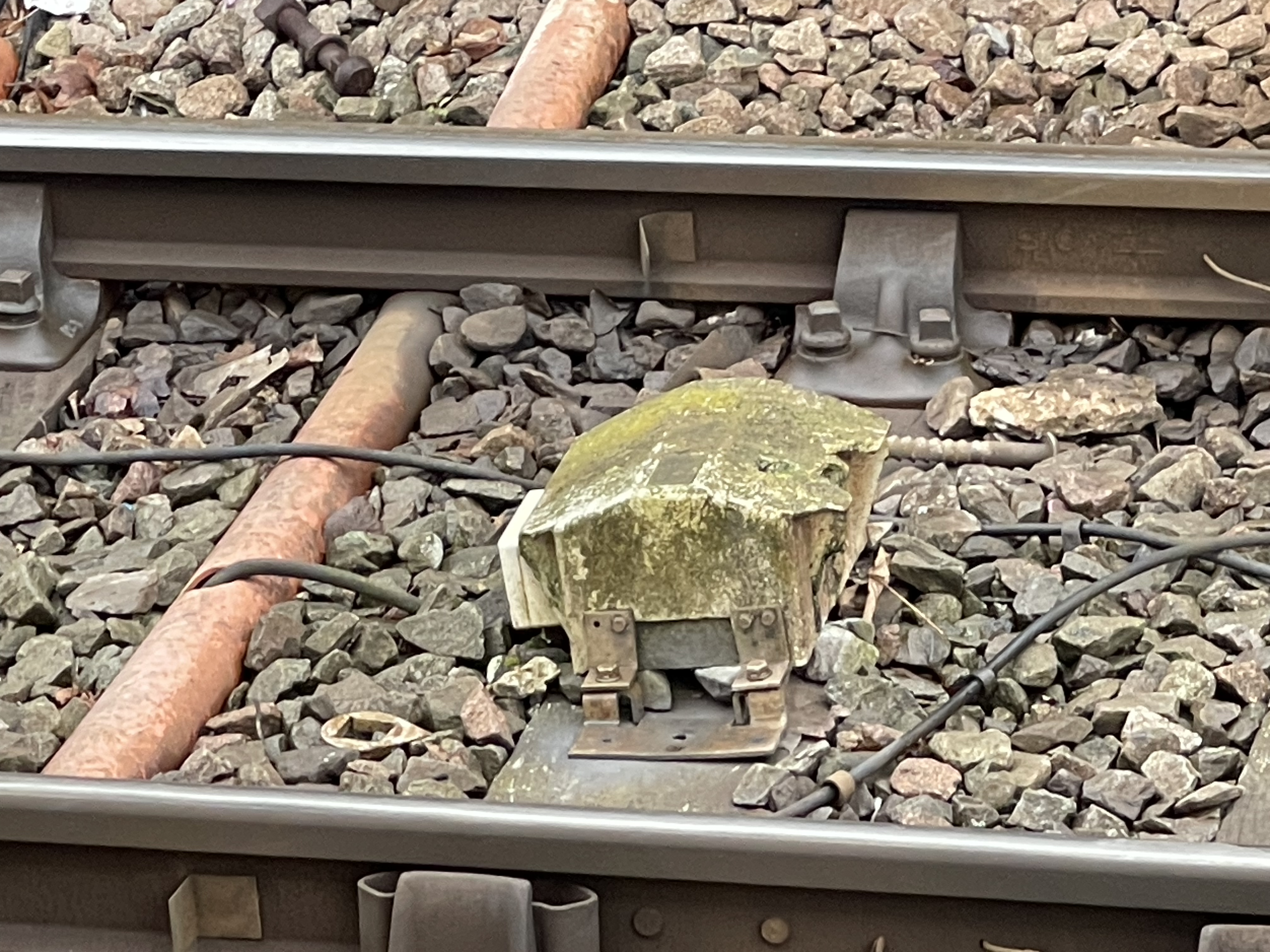
An ATS beacon before a signal

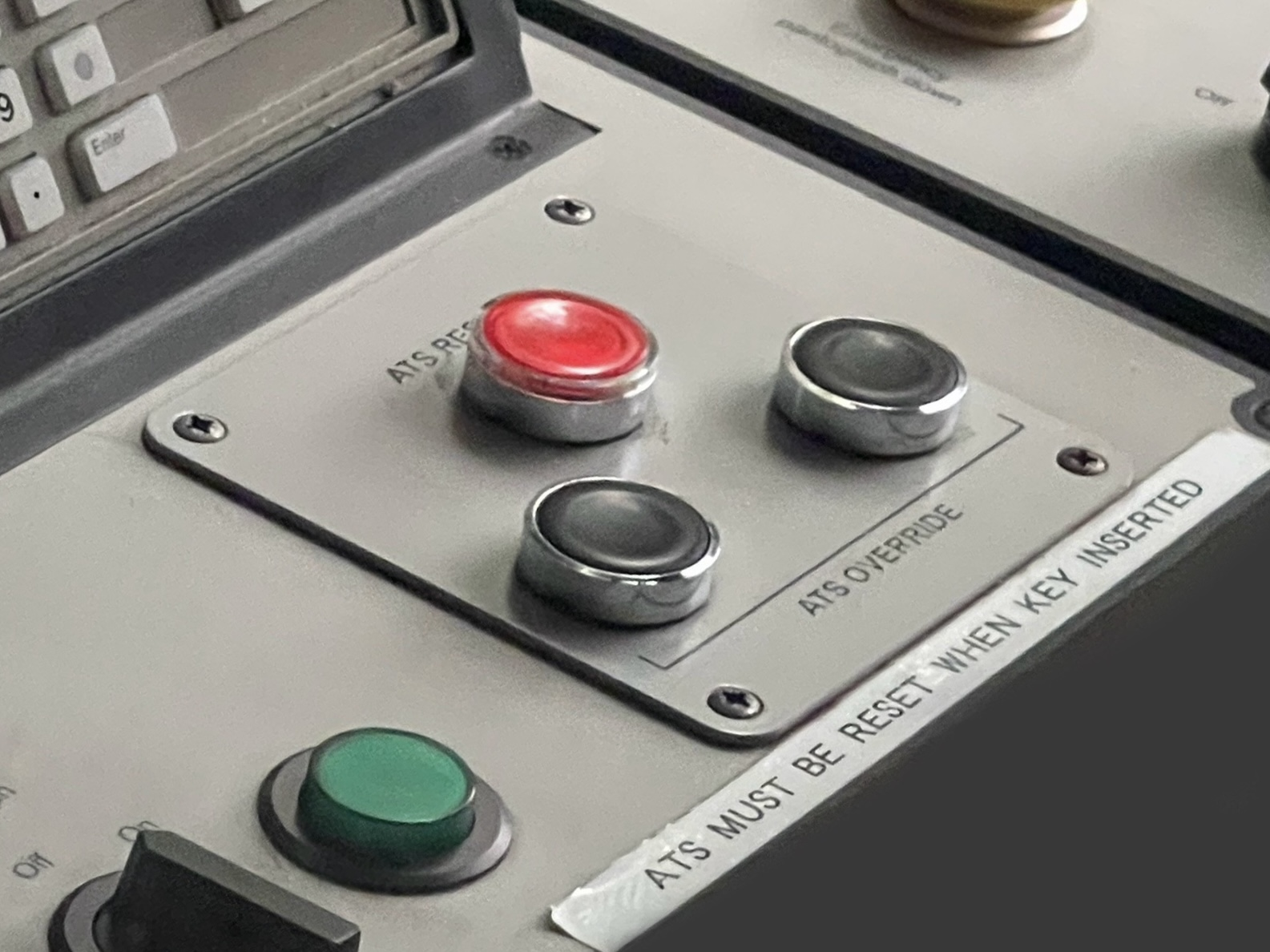
Retrofitted ATS device from an older vehicle

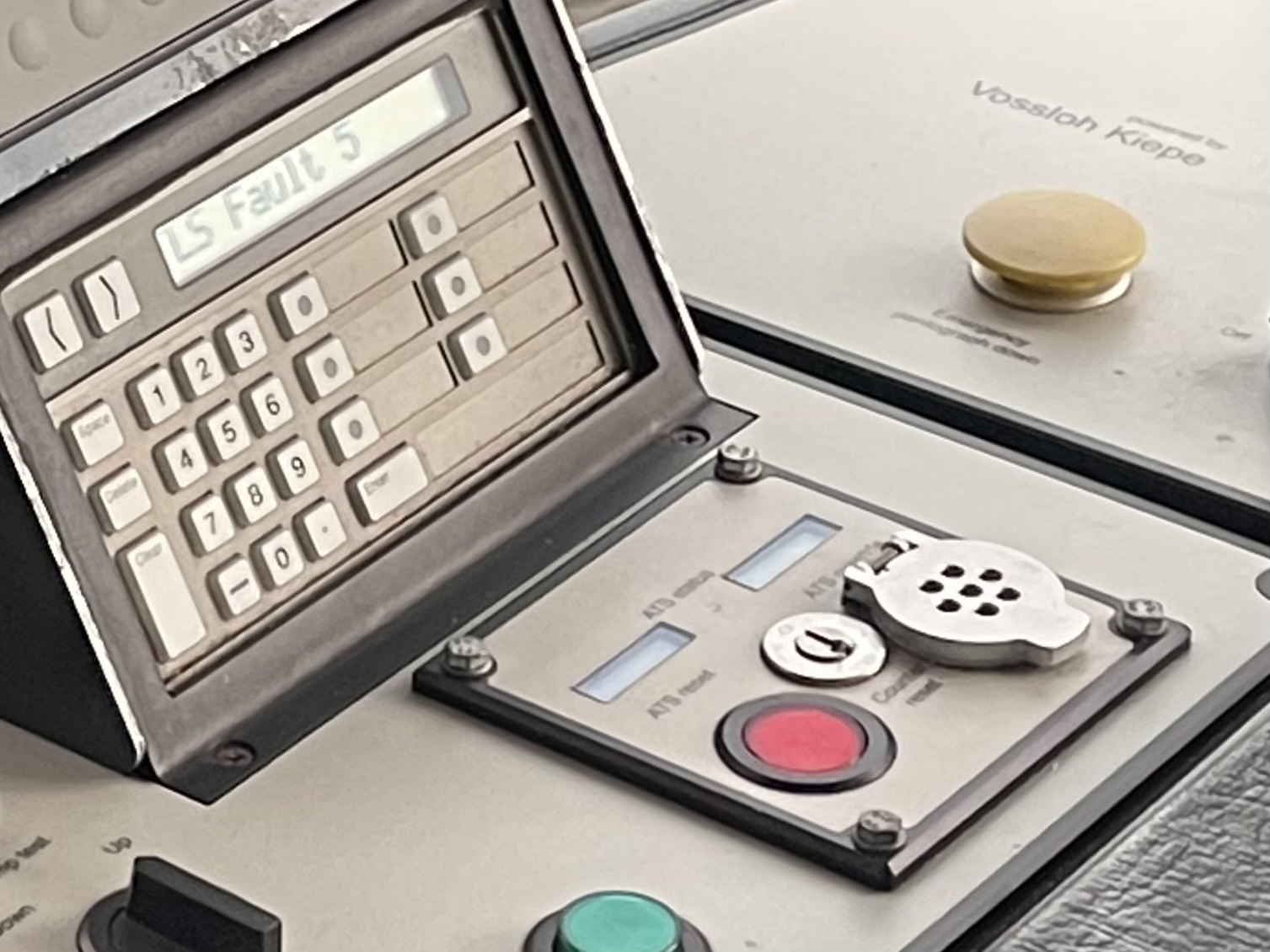
Factory-fitted ATS device

London Underground lines are universally fitted with ATS equipment. This comprises a trip arm just outside the right-hand running rail, and an air valve known as a tripcock on the leading bogie of the train. When the applicable signal shows 'danger', the trip arm is held up by a spring. If a train attempts to pass the signal, the trip arm makes contact with the tripcock. This opens the tripcock, which is connected to the train pipe of the air brakes, and causes an emergency brake application to be made. When the signal shows 'clear', the stop arm is lowered by compressed air.

=== China ===
Many China Railway trunk lines use an ATS system introduced in the late-1980s, similar in principle to Japanese ATS-P and ATC.

== See also ==
- Automatic Train Protection
- Train stop
- Anti Collision Device
