= Pulse code cab signaling =

Railway track status technology

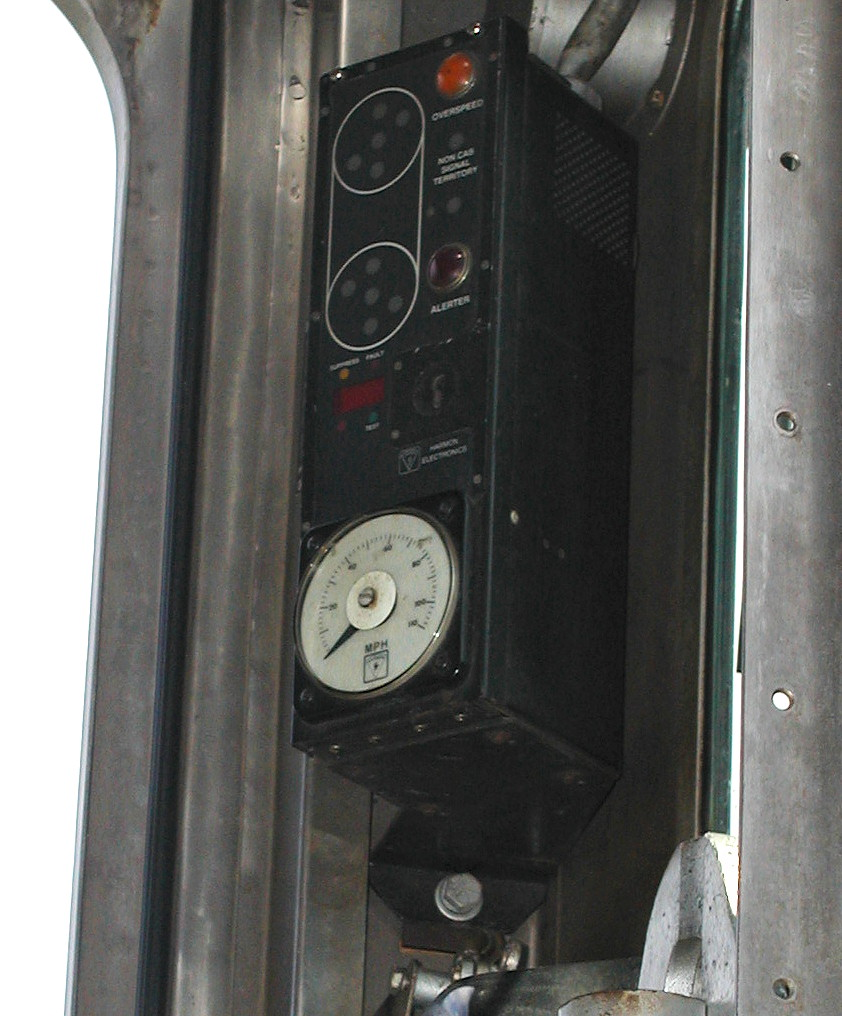
SEPTA cab signal display for the 4-aspect PRR system using position light aspects

Pulse code cab signaling is a form of cab signaling technology developed in the United States by the Union Switch and Signal corporation for the Pennsylvania Railroad (PRR) in the 1920s. The 4-aspect system widely adopted by the PRR and its successor railroads has become the dominant railroad cab signaling system in North America with versions of the technology also being adopted on rapid transit systems and European national network rail. The system is known simply as the Cab Signaling System or CSS on lines owned by PRR successor Conrail and railroads operating under the NORAC Rulebook.

== History ==
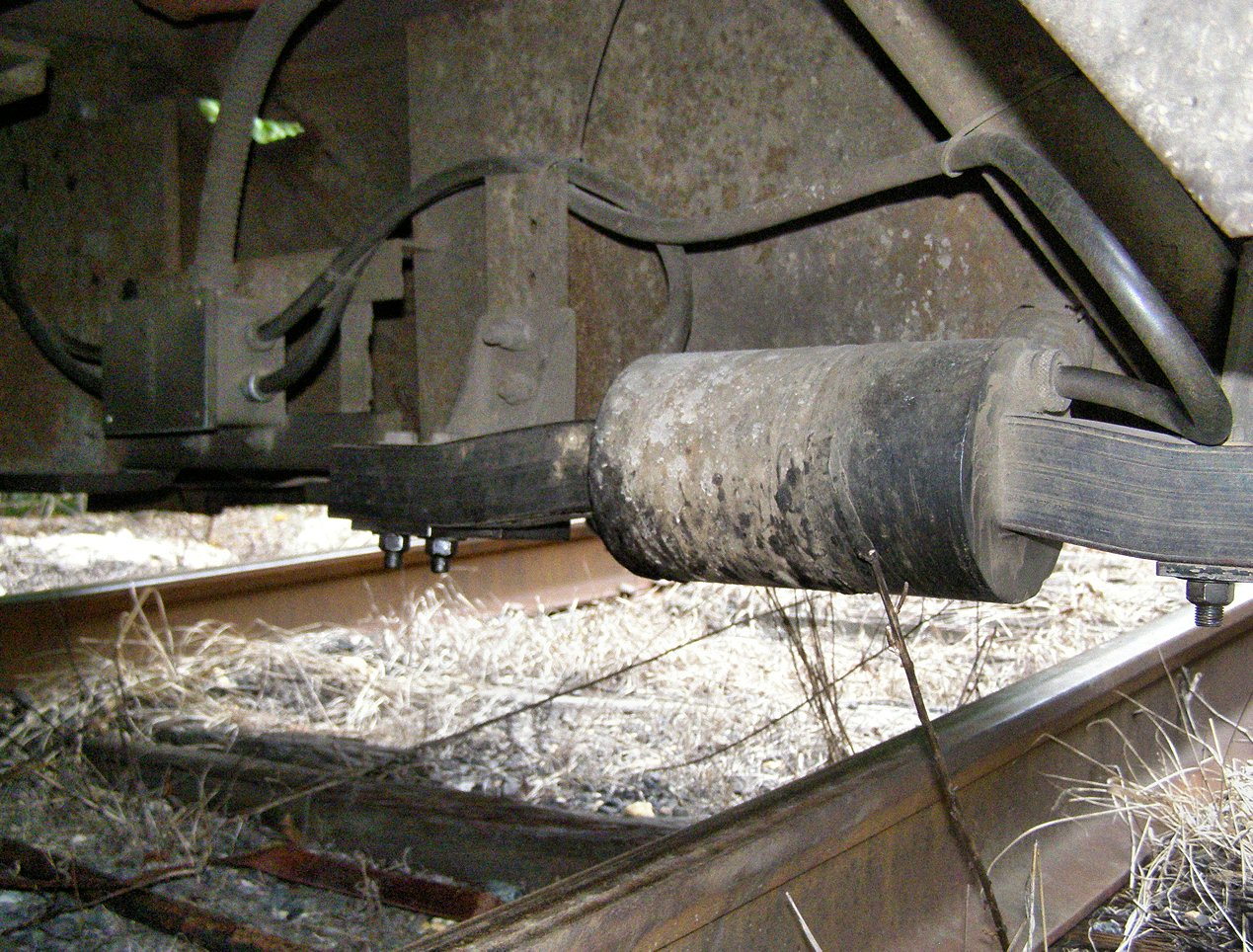
Pulse code CSS antenna mounted under the pilot of an SRNJ diesel locomotive

In 1922 the Interstate Commerce Commission issued a ruling requiring trains to be equipped with automatic train stop technology if they were to be operated at 80 mph or greater. The Pennsylvania Railroad decided to use this as an opportunity to implement a signaling technology that could improve both safety and operational efficiency by displaying a signal continuously in the locomotive cab. The task was assigned to Union Switch and Signal corporation, the PRR's preferred signal supplier.

The first test installation between Sunbury and Lewistown, PA in 1923 used the tracks as an inductive loop coupled to the locomotive's receiver. The system had two 60 Hz signals. The break-sensing “track” signal was fed down one rail towards the oncoming train and crossed through its wheels, returning in the other rail. The pickup just ahead of the wheels would sum the approaching current from one side with the returning current on the other. The externally returned ”loop” signal was fed into and out of the mid tap of a resistor across each end of the track circuit. The pickup would sum the approaching current on each side as it carried on past to the far end of the track. This signal was shifted 90 degrees from the other. The signals were applied one or both continuously to give Approach or Clear aspects while no signal was a Restricting aspect. The test installation eliminated wayside block signals, and trains relied solely on cab signals.

For its next installation, on the Northern Central line between Baltimore, MD and Harrisburg, PA in 1926 (1927?), the PRR tested another variation of cab signals which dropped the loop signal and switched to 100 Hz for the track signal. The pivotal change was that now it would come on above Restricting merely as a carrier and 1.25 to 3 Hz on-off pulsing of it would be used as a code to convey the aspects. The presence of the carrier alone was not meaningful, no pulsing would still mean a Restricting aspect. This new system allowed four signal aspects: Restricting; Approach; Approach (next signal at) Medium (speed); and Clear. Initially the cab signaling system only acted as a form of automatic train stop where the engineer would have to acknowledge any drop in the cab signal to a more restrictive aspect to prevent the brakes from automatically applying. Later, passenger engines were upgraded with speed control which enforced the rulebook speed associated with each cab signal (Clear = No Restriction, Approach Medium = 45 mph, Approach = 30 mph, Restricting = 20 mph).

Over time the PRR installed cab signals over much of its eastern system from Pittsburgh to Philadelphia, New York to Washington. This system was then inherited by Conrail and Amtrak and various commuter agencies running on former PRR territory such as SEPTA and New Jersey Transit. Because all trains running in cab signal territory had to be equipped with cab signals, most locomotives of the aforementioned roads were equipped with cab signal equipment. Pulse code cab signals based on the PRR system have been deployed worldwide.

== Technical overview ==
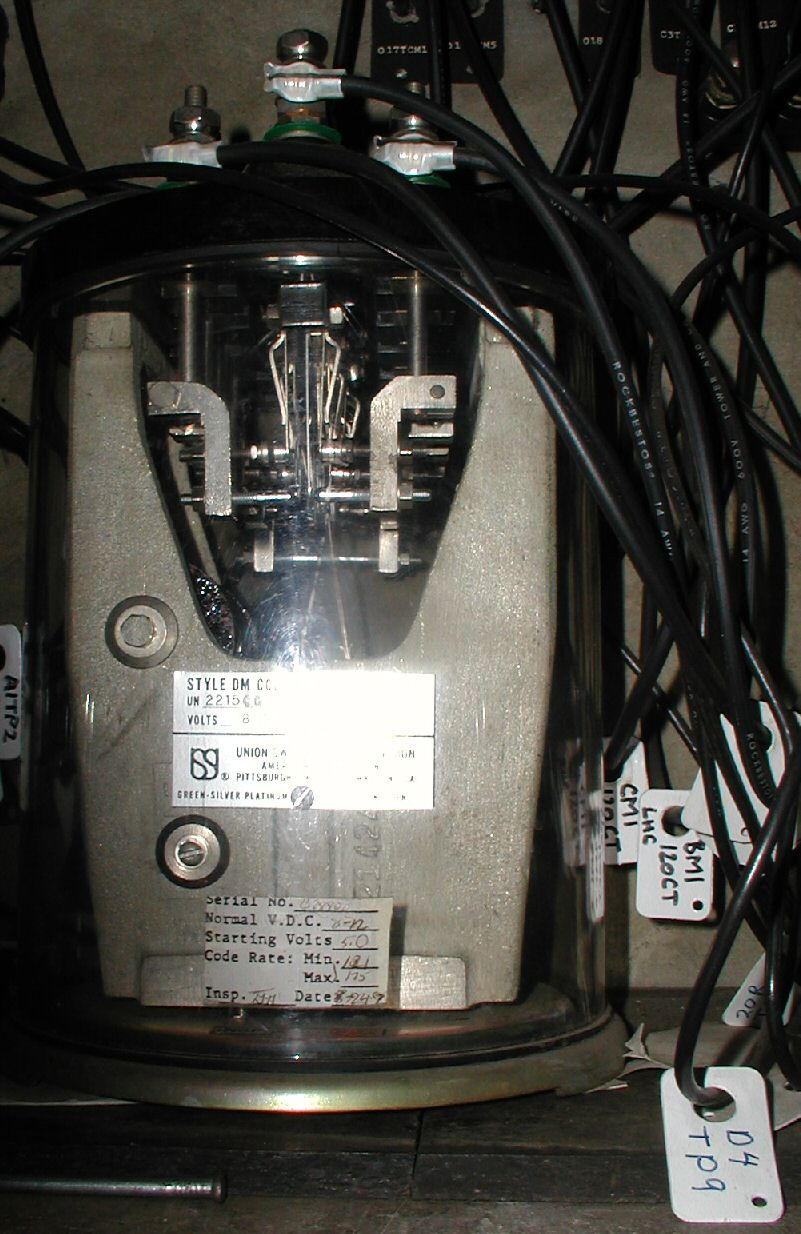
US&S electro-mechanical pulse code generator unit generating 180ppm for a cab signal system

=== Basic operation ===
Pulse code cab signals work by sending metered pulses along an existing AC track circuit operating at a chosen carrier frequency. The pulses are detected via induction by a sensor hanging a few inches above the rail before the leading set of wheels. The codes are measured in pulses per minute (ppm) and for the 4-aspect PRR system are set at 180 ppm for Clear, 120 ppm for Approach Medium, 75 ppm for Approach and 0 for Restricting. The pulse rates are chosen to avoid any one rate being a multiple of another leading to reflected harmonics causing false indications.

The system is failsafe since the lack of a code causes a Restricting signal to display. The codes are transmitted to the train from the block limit in front of it. This way if the rail was broken or another train entered the block, any codes would not reach the approaching train and the cab signal would again display Restricting. Trains with an insufficient number of axles will not short out (see: Shunt (electrical)) all of the cab signal current so that following trains might receive an incorrect aspect. Trains of this type must be given absolute block protection to the rear.

Where DC and 25 Hz AC electrification co-exist, the standard 100 Hz frequency is changed to 91 2/3 Hz (next available M-G set frequency). This avoids even harmonics created by the return rail's DC traction current offsetting the AC return sine wave in the same rail.

=== Enhancements for higher speeds ===
70 years after pulse code cab signals had been introduced, the 4 speed design was found to be insufficient for speeds not envisioned when the system was designed. The two most pressing problems were the use of high speed turnouts, which allowed trains to take a diverging route faster than the normal 30 or 45 mph covered by the existing cab signals. The introduction of Amtrak's Acela Express service with its 135 mph to 160 mph maximum speeds would also exceed the capabilities of the legacy signaling system and its 125 mph design speed.

To address the problem and avoid a complete rebuild of the signaling system, which could impair lower speed service, break backwards compatibility with existing cab signals or place too high a reliance on the human operator, an overlay pulse code system was devised for use on Amtrak's Northeast Corridor. By operating with a different carrier frequency of 250 Hz, additional pulse codes could be sent to the train without interfering with legacy 100 Hz codes. By carefully designing the overlay codes, backwards compatibility could be maintained so that any train unable to detect the new codes would never receive a signal more favorable than had it would otherwise detect. In addition to the use of 250 Hz codes, a 270 ppm code was incorporated from rapid transit and Long Island Rail Road use.

The mapping of codes to speeds is as follows:

100 Hz code	250 Hz code	Cab Signal Aspect	Cab Signal Speed	Notes
180	180	Clear 160	160 mph	Legacy Units get Clear (125 mph)
180	—	Clear 125	125 mph	Original PRR System Code
270	270	Clear 100	100 mph	Used for high density signaling.
270	—	Cab Speed 60	60 mph	Used for high density signaling. Compatible with LIRR ASC System
120	120	Cab Speed 80	80 mph	Used for most high speed turnouts. Legacy Units get Approach Medium.
120	—	Approach Limited	45 mph	Original PRR System Code
75	75	Approach Medium	30 mph	Used for high density signaling. Legacy Units get Approach
75	—	Approach	30 mph	Original PRR System Code
0	—	Restricting	20 mph	Original PRR System Code. Failsafe state

Trains that can interpret the 250 Hz codes get upgraded speeds on track sections with speeds greater than 125 mph and on 80 mph high speed turnouts, while trains that cannot travel at the slower speeds coded by the legacy system. The 270 ppm code does break backwards compatibility with the 4-code system, but is only in use around New York Penn Station as part of a high-density signaling upgrade. The 270 ppm code and 60 mph speed were chosen to be compatible with the cab signaling system installed on Long Island Rail Road trains serving Penn Station.

=== Cab display unit ===
Cab signals are presented to the locomotive by means of a cab signal display unit. The earliest CDUs consisted of miniature signals of the type visible along the track, back lit by light bulbs. These could be found in both color light and position light varieties depending on the railroad's native signaling system. Modern CDUs on passenger trains are often integrated with the speedometer, as cab signals now serve a speed control function. On trains equipped with automatic train control functionality failure to properly acknowledge a restrictive cab signal change results in a 'penalty brake application', as does failure to observe the cab signal speed limit.

== Usage ==
=== Current lines using the 100 Hz 4-aspect PRR cab signal system ===
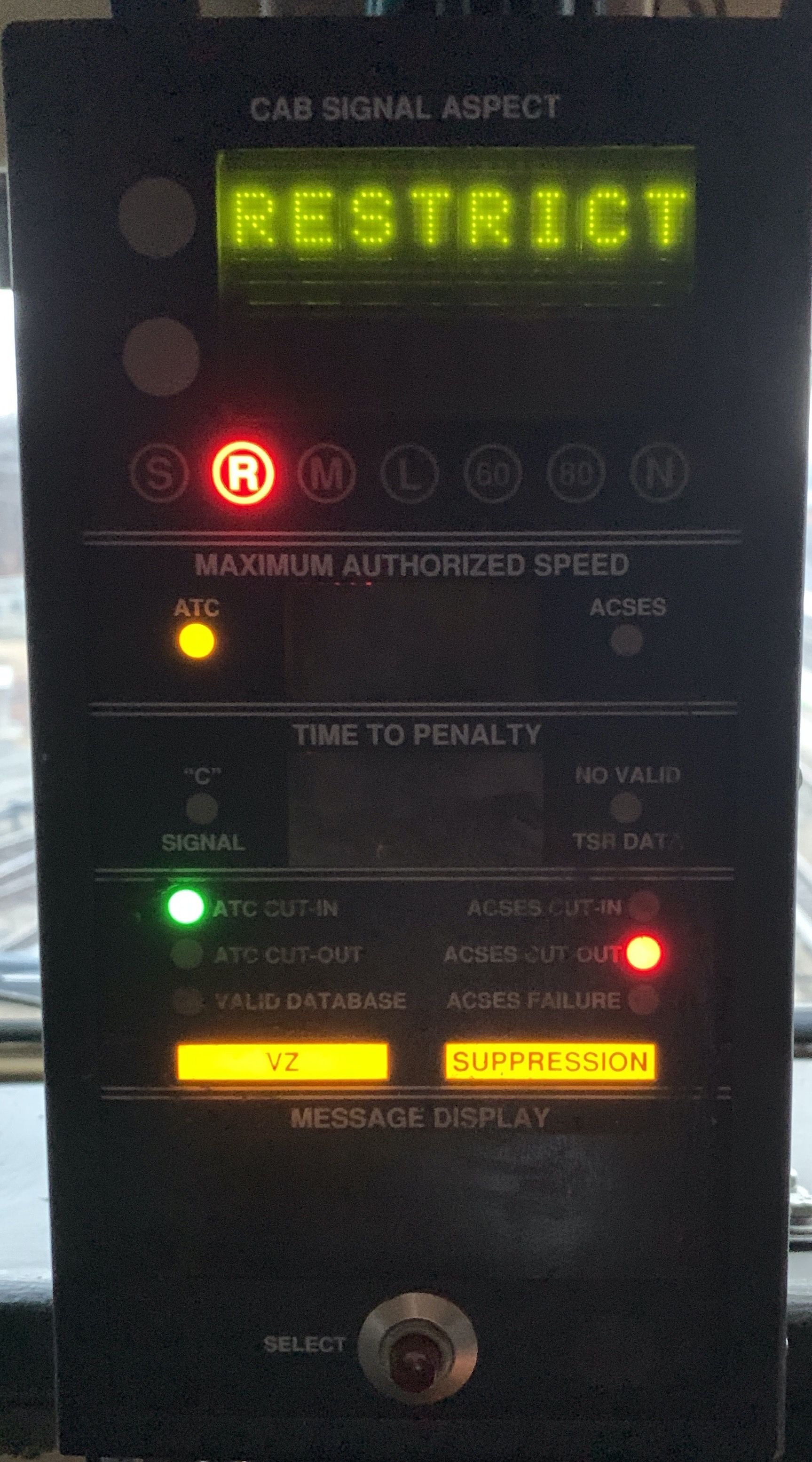
Siemens 9-Aspect Cab Signal ADU along with the ACSES display. This unit is currently displaying a RESTRICTING aspect.

- Amtrak Main Line—Mill River to Springfield
- Amtrak Main Line—New Haven to Boston
- Amtrak Main Line—New York to Hoffmans
- Amtrak Main Line—New York to New Rochelle
- Amtrak Main Line—New York to Philadelphia
- Amtrak Main Line—Philadelphia to Harrisburg
- Amtrak Main Line—Philadelphia to Washington
- Conrail Lehigh Line
- CSX Berkshire Subdivision (no waysides)
- CSX Boston Subdivision (no waysides)
- CSX Landover Subdivision
- NJT All lines (except Princeton Branch)
- MBTA All lines (no waysides)
- Metro-North Hudson Line (no waysides)
- Metro-North Harlem Line (no waysides)
- Metro-North New Haven Line (no waysides)
- Metro-North New Canaan Branch (no waysides)
- Metro-North Danbury Branch (no waysides)
- Metro-North Waterbury Branch (no waysides)
- Metro-North Southern Tier Line (no waysides)
- Norfolk Southern Pittsburgh Line (no waysides)
- Norfolk Southern Port Road Line
- Norfolk Southern Conemaugh Line (no waysides)
- Norfolk Southern Morrisville Line (no waysides)
- Norfolk Southern Fort Wayne Line (Conway Yard to Alliance, Ohio, no waysides)
- Norfolk Southern Cleveland Line (Alliance, Ohio to Cleveland, Ohio, no waysides)
- SEPTA Main Line (Center City to Doylestown; no waysides north of Wayne Junction)
- SEPTA Airport Line
- SEPTA Chestnut Hill East Line (no waysides)
- SEPTA Chestnut Hill West Line (no waysides)
- SEPTA Cynwyd Line (no waysides)
- SEPTA Fox Chase Line (no waysides)
- SEPTA Manayunk/Norristown Line (no waysides)
- SEPTA Media/Wawa Line
- SEPTA Warminster Line (no waysides)
- SEPTA West Trenton Line (no waysides)

=== Related North American pulse code systems ===
- Long Island Rail Road Automatic Speed Control: The LIRR was a PRR subsidiary and adopted a similar system. The LIRR used standard PRR cab signals until it was bought by the Metropolitan Transportation Authority in 1968. At that time, the LIRR system was modified slightly to the current Automatic Speed Control (ASC) system. ASC employs two additional codes, 270 and 420 ppm and replaces the in-cab signal display with an in-cab speed display. The additional codes are used to display speeds of 50/60 and 60/70 mph, which are used to slow trains for curves, higher speed turnouts and short signal blocks.
- Chicago, Burlington and Quincy Automatic Cab Signaling: The CB&Q commuter line to Aurora, Illinois used the same technology as the Pennsylvania, just with different rules and wayside indications to conform to their partly route-based signaling system. It remains in service to the present day.
- Union Pacific Automatic Cab Signaling: The Union Pacific has implemented the PRR type technology on much of its main line between Chicago and Wyoming, as well as several other lines on its system in recent years. As with the CB&Q cab signals, the system works under the same principles as the PRR system, but uses different rules with partly route-based wayside signals and a 60 Hz carrier, which makes it somewhat incompatible with the 100 Hz systems.
- Metra Rock Island Automatic Train Control: Another PRR based cab signal system remnant from the Rock Island. The system is in service on the Metra Rock Island District between Blue Island and Joliet.
- Rapid Transit Lines: Various rapid transit lines built or re-signaled in or before the 1990s make use of the pulse-code cab signal technology for both manual or automatic train operation schemes. Rapid transit systems are typically failsafe with a 0 code mandating a complete stop. Also, the complete range of pulse codes are used to provide the maximum granularity in speed control. Some examples include the PATCO Speedline in Philadelphia, the SEPTA Route 100, the Baltimore Metro and the Miami-Dade Metrorail. Pulse-code technology on rapid transit lines has generally been supplanted by Audio-Frequency cab signals.
- MTA Staten Island Railway Automatic Speed Control: A hybrid of the PRR/LIRR systems and Rapid Transit power-frequency cab code. The ATC applies service braking in response to overspeed conditions. 75-120-180-270 are used as speed commands. Zero code is used for stop rather than restricting, which is 50PPM. 420 is used as a latch-out. Dispatchers may authorize trains stopped by a zero-code to close in on certain interlocking signals by manually activating a 50 ppm close-in code.

=== European pulse code systems ===
- RS4 Codici is the legacy cab signaling system used in Italy. The system makes use of 0, 75, 120, 180 and 270 ppm codes using a 50 Hz current.
- Continuous Automatic Warning System is the cab signaling systems in Ireland. The system makes use of 0, 50, 120 and 180 ppm codes using a 50 Hz carrier current. Additional codes are used on some rapid transit lines.
- Automatische treinbeïnvloeding is the Dutch cab signaling system. It makes use of 0, 75, 96, 120, 180 and 220 ppm codes using a 75 Hz carrier, supplemented by an inductive train stop system for speeds under 25 mph.
- London Underground Victoria line used US&S supplied pulse code cab signals to implement its Automatic train operation system until 2012 when it was replaced by CBTC. Codes used were 420, 270, 180 and 120 ppm.
- ALSN (Continuous Automatic Train Signalling) is a legacy system used in the ex-Soviet states (Russian Federation, Ukraine, Belarus, Latvia, Lithuania, Estonia and so on). All the lines fitted with automatic block system in ex-Soviet countries are fitted with ALSN, some of them without wayside signals. Since 1990s station tracks and station approach sections on some per-station block system ("semiautomatic block") lines are fitted as well. In contrast with other systems mentioned before, ALSN makes use of pulse count code rather than uniform pulse at some defined rates. There are 3 codes: "red-yellow" (single pulses separated by long gaps), "yellow" (series of 2 pulses with one short gap inside the series) and "green" (series of 3 pulses with two short gaps inside the series), while the exact length of pulses and long gaps may vary substantially to form different code cycle length (usually 1,6 s or 1,86 s) which has no signal meaning, but is used for safety and for block counting on the train. Carrier frequencies are: 50 Hz where 3 kV DC electric traction or no electric traction is used, and 25 Hz (or sometimes 75 Hz - an old standard) on lines with 25 kV 50 Hz AC electric traction.
