= Sotetsu 11000 series =

Japanese train type

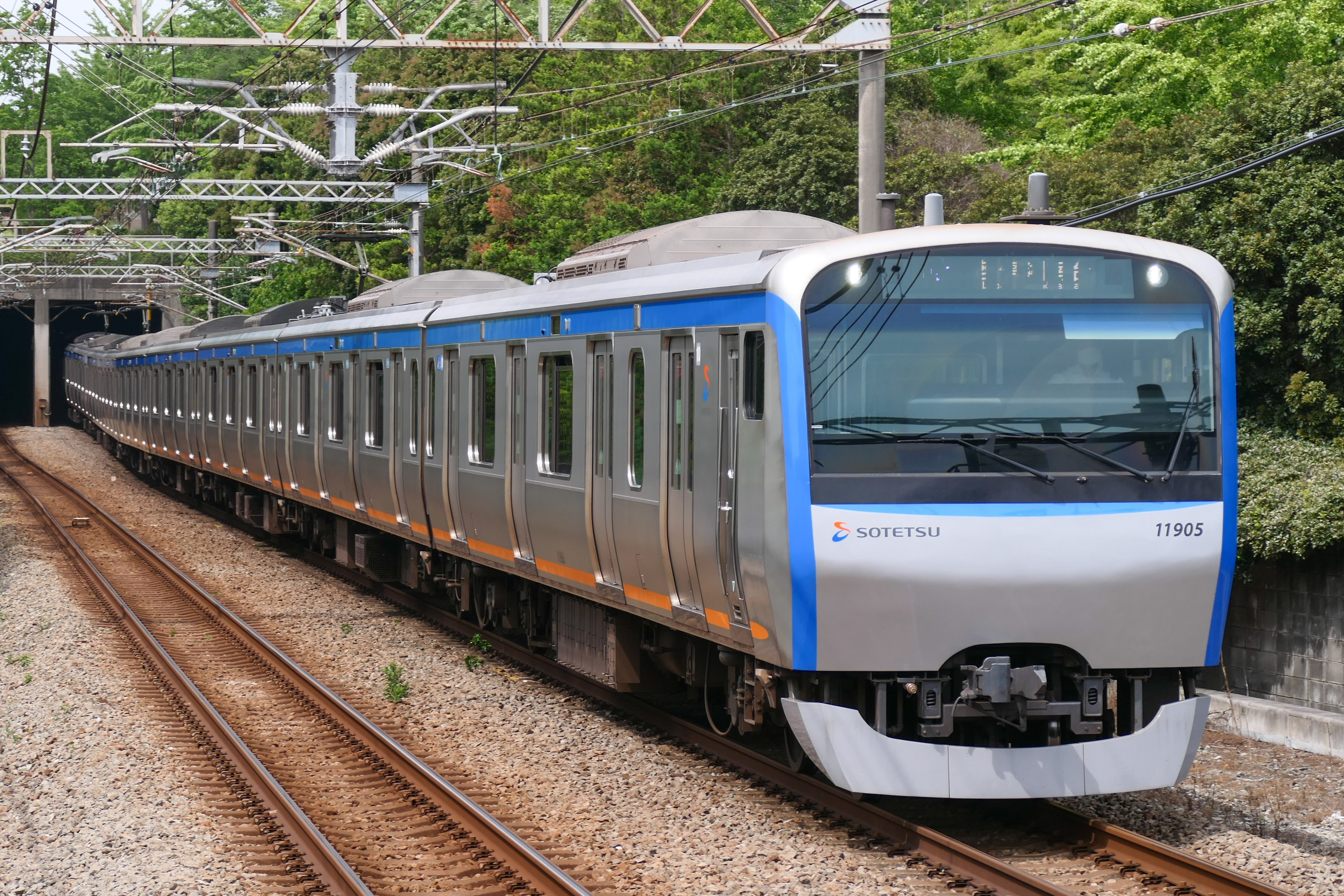
- An 11000 series in May 2021
- Manufacturer: JR East Niitsu, Tokyu Car Corporation, J-TREC
- Replaced: 5000 series, 7000 series
- Constructed: 2008–2012
- Entered service: 15 June 2009
- Number built: 50 cars (5 sets)
- Number in service: 50 cars (5 sets)
- Formation: 10 cars per trainset
- Capacity: 1,564 (510 seated)
- Operators: Sotetsu
- Depots: Kashiwadai
- Lines served: Sotetsu Main Line; Sotetsu Izumino Line

Specifications
- Car body construction: Stainless steel
- Car length: 19,620 mm (64 ft 4 in) (end cars); 19,500 mm (64 ft 0 in) (intermediate cars)
- Width: 2,950 mm (9 ft 8 in)
- Floor height: 1,130 mm (3 ft 8 in)
- Doors: 4 pairs per side
- Maximum speed: 100 km/h (62 mph)
- Acceleration: 3.0 km/(h⋅s) (1.9 mph/s)
- Deceleration: 4.8 km/(h⋅s) (3.0 mph/s)
- Electric system(s): 1,500 V DC overhead lines
- Current collector(s): Pantograph
- Safety system(s): ATS-P
- Track gauge: 1,067 mm (3 ft 6 in)

The Sotetsu 11000 series (相鉄11000系) is an electric multiple unit (EMU) commuter train type operated by the private railway operator Sagami Railway (Sotetsu) in Japan since June 2009, replacing aging 5000 and 7000 series trains. Based on the JR E233-1000 series design, cars have four pairs of sliding doors per side.

== Formation ==
As of 1 April 2016, the fleet consists of five ten-car sets, based at Kashiwadai Depot and formed as follows.

Car No.	1	2	3	4	5	6	7	8	9	10
Designation	Tc2	M1	M2	M3	M4	T1	T2	M5	M6	Tc1
Numbering	11000	11100	11200	11300	11400	11500	11600	11700	11800	11900

Car 2 has two single-arm pantographs, and cars 4 and 8 each have one.

== Interior ==
Cars 1 and 10 have wheelchair spaces. Cars 4 and 9 are designated as mildly air-conditioned cars.

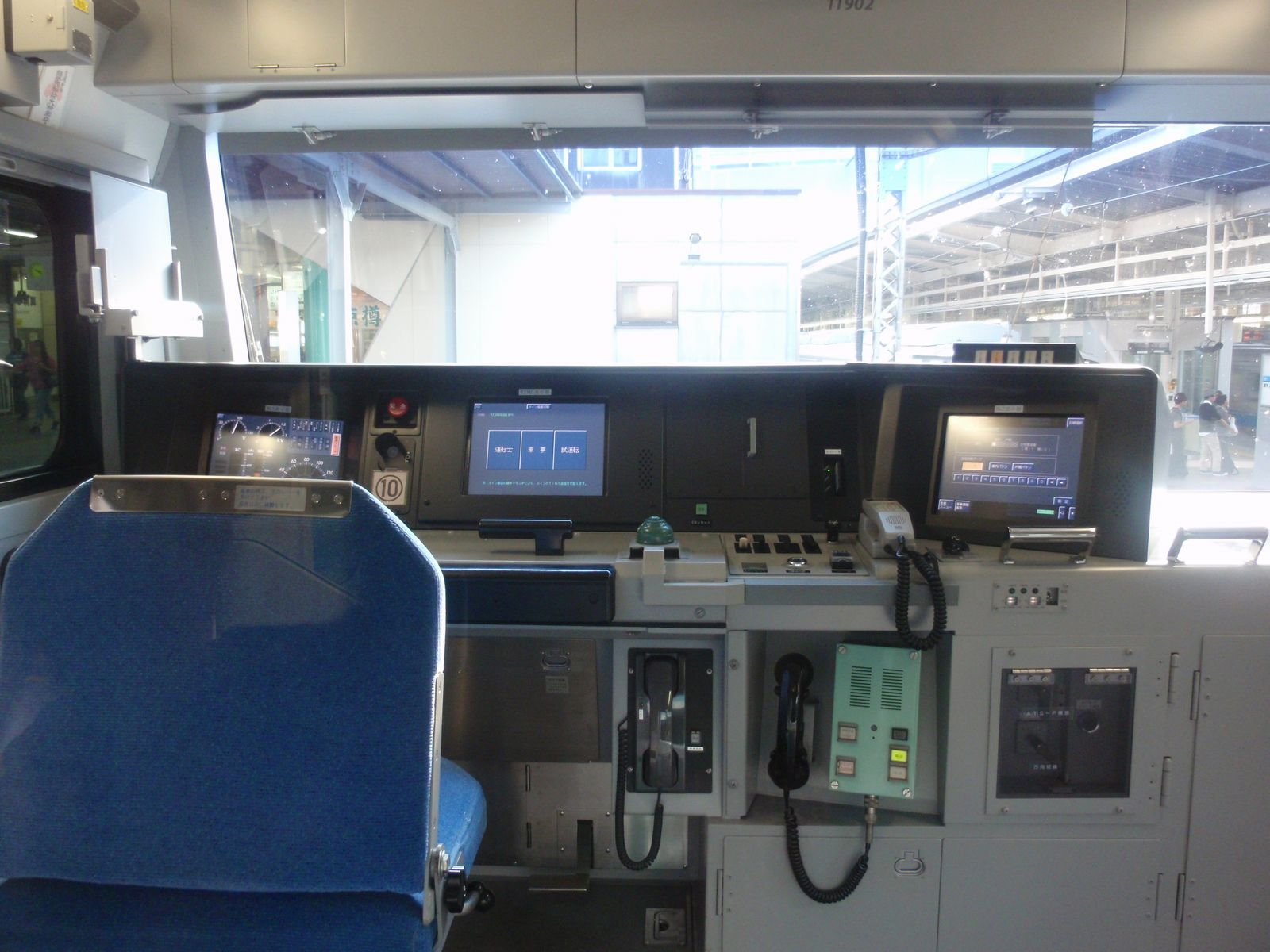
Driver's cab

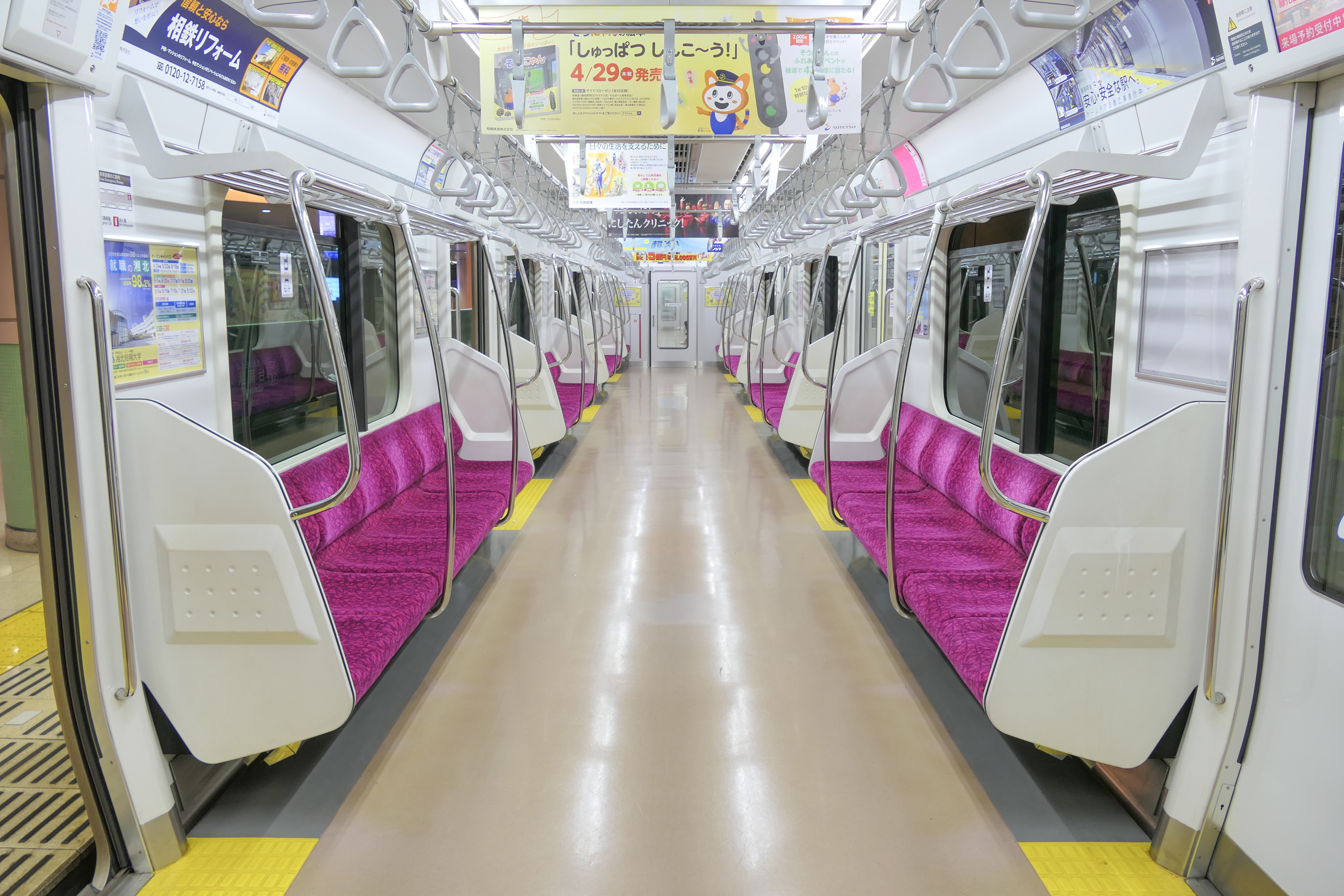
Interior view

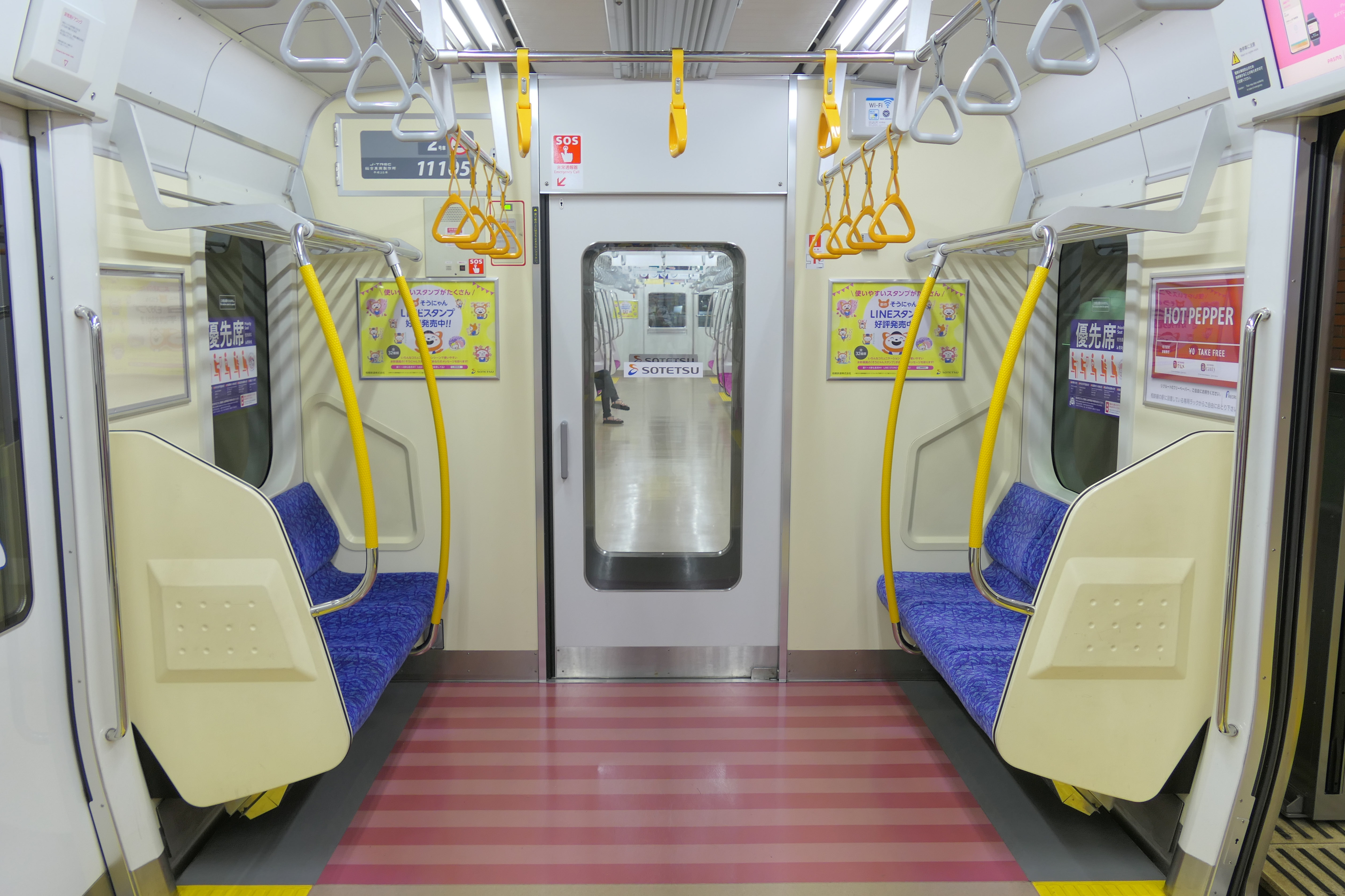
Priority seating

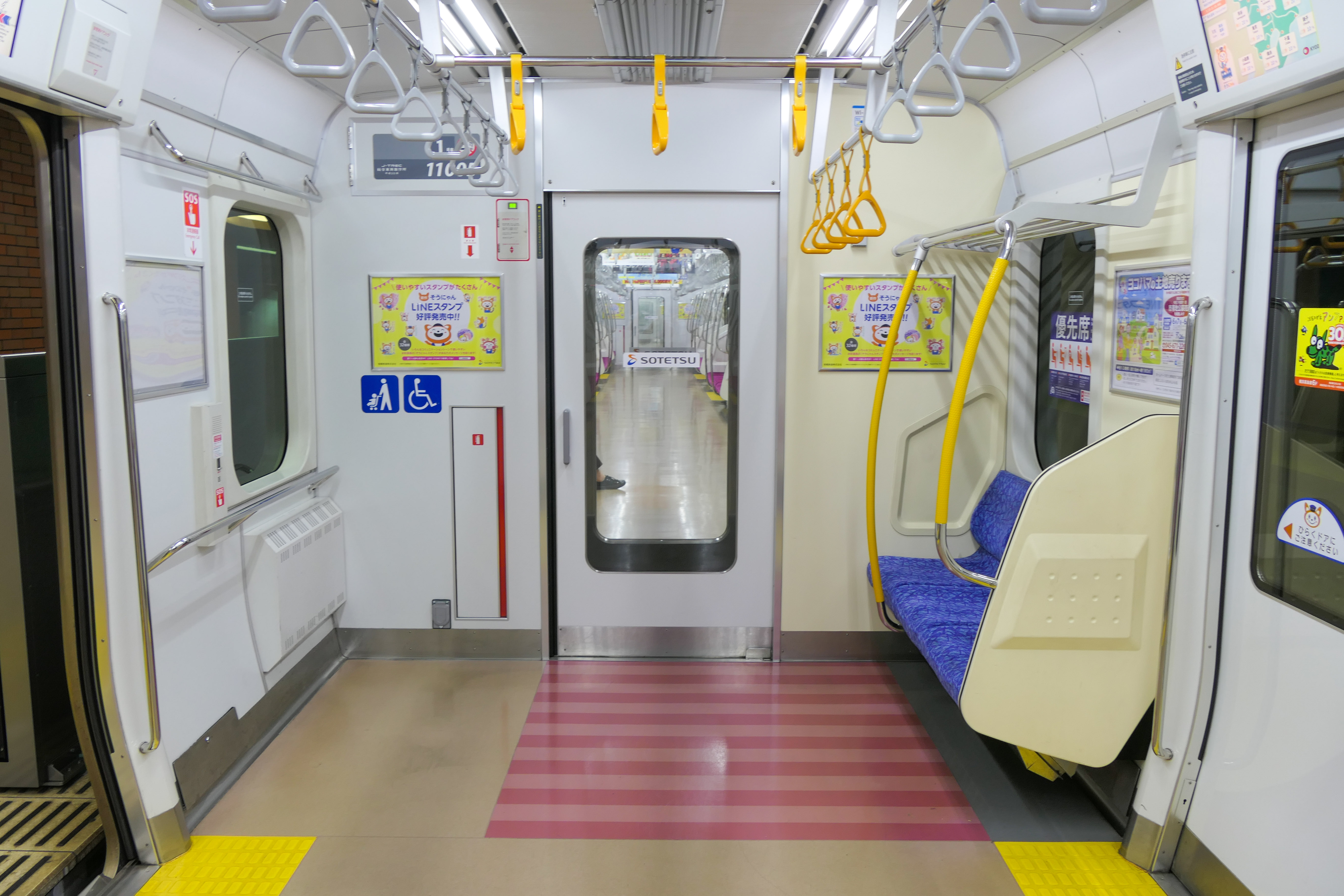
Wheelchair space

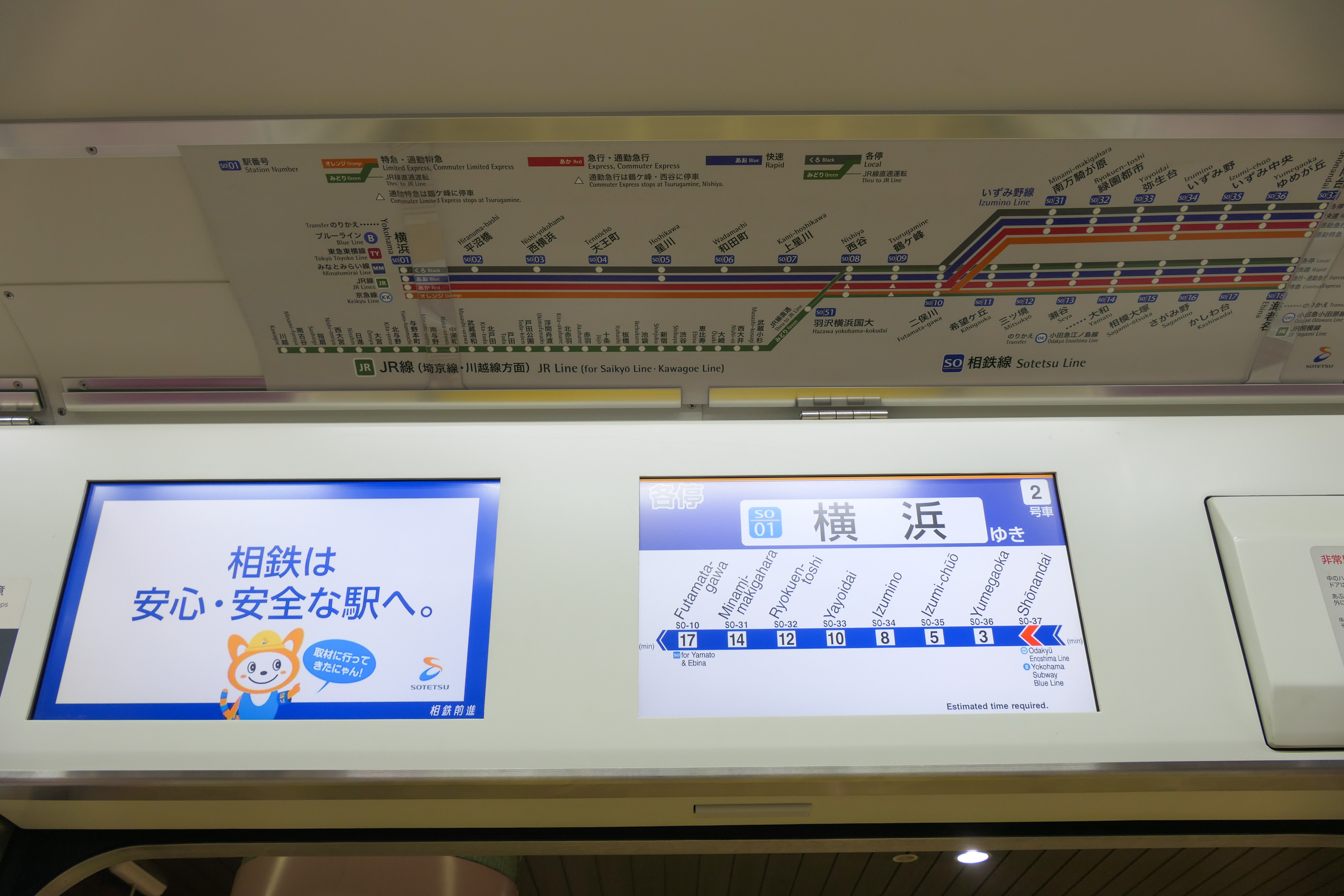
LCD passenger information displays

== History ==
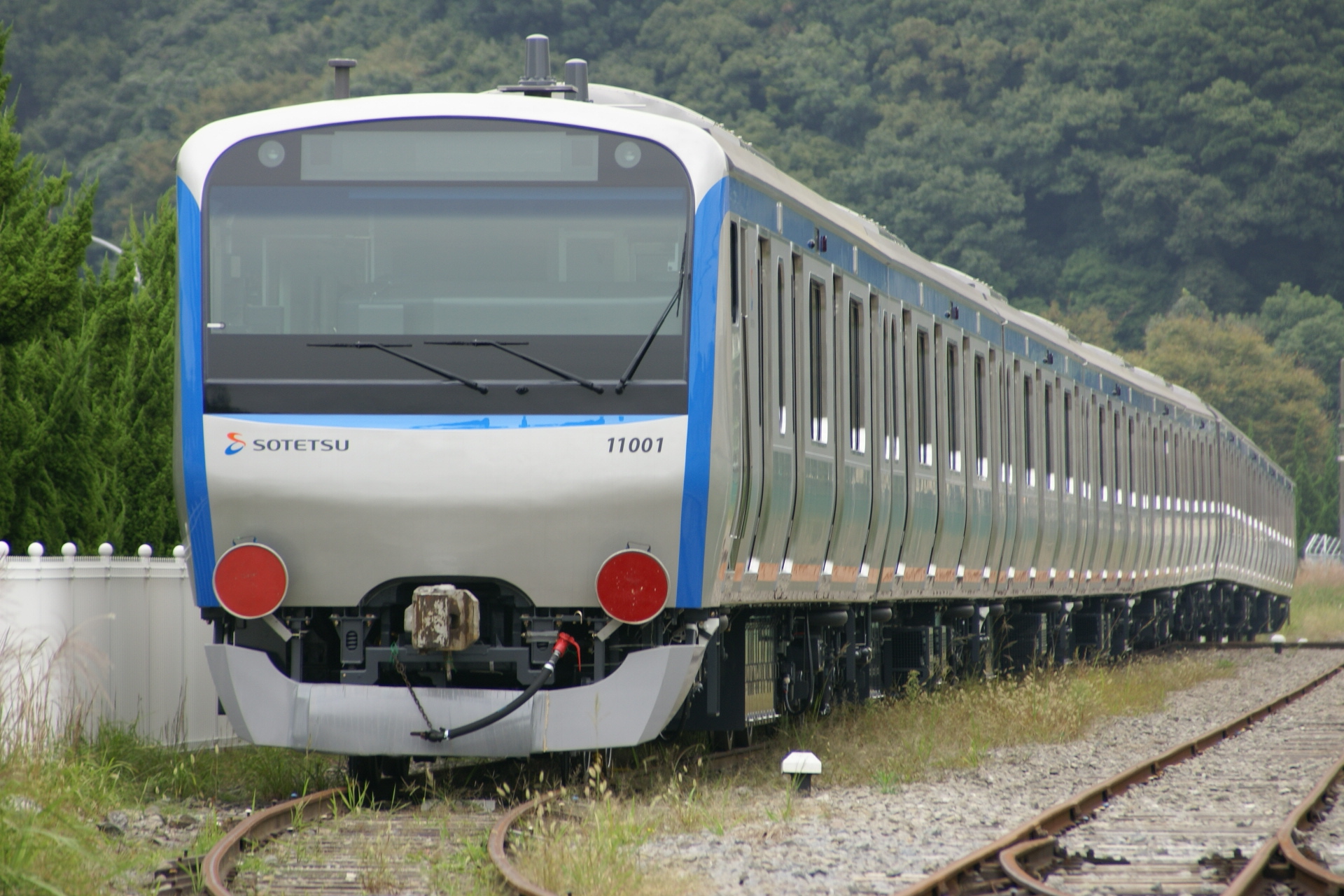
The first set, 11001, on delivery in October 2008

The first set was delivered from Tokyu Car Corporation (now J-TREC) in October 2008, and entered revenue-earning service from 15 June 2009.

A fifth set, 11005, was delivered in January 2013.

== See also ==
- Sotetsu 10000 series
