= Sotetsu 10000 series =

Japanese train type

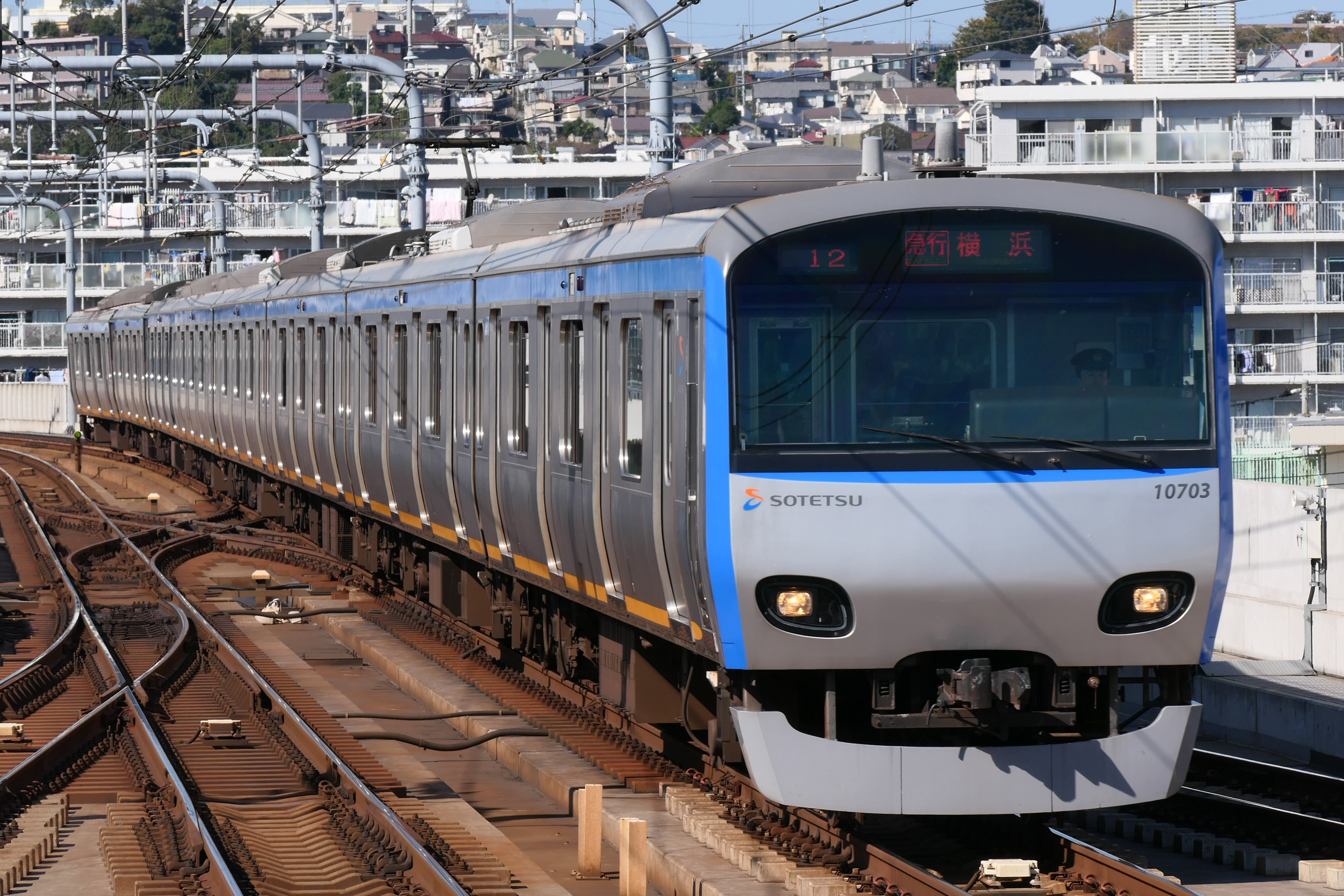
- 10000 series 8-car set in October 2020
- Manufacturer: JR East Niitsu, Tokyu Car Corporation
- Entered service: 24 February 2002
- Refurbished: 2019–
- Number built: 70 cars (8 sets)
- Number in service: 70 cars (8 sets)
- Formation: 8 or 10 cars per set
- Fleet numbers: 10701–10708
- Operators: Sotetsu

Specifications
- Car body construction: Stainless steel
- Car length: 20 m (65 ft 7 in)
- Width: 2,930 mm (9 ft 7 in)
- Doors: 4 pairs per side
- Electric system(s): 1,500 V DC (overhead catenary)
- Current collector(s): Pantograph
- Safety system(s): ATS-P
- Track gauge: 1,067 mm (3 ft 6 in)

The Sotetsu 10000 series (相鉄10000系) is an electric multiple unit (EMU) commuter train type operated by the private railway operator Sagami Railway (Sotetsu) in Japan.

== History ==
Entering service on 24 February 2002, the trains are based on JR East's E231 series design, and were built to replace ageing 5000, 2100, and 6000 series trains. The 10000 series were constructed by Tokyu Car Corporation in Yokohama and JR East's Niitsu factory. A total of 70 cars were built, formed as sets.

== Formations ==
As of 1 April 2016, the fleet consists of three 10-car sets and five 8-car sets, formed as follows.

=== 10-car sets ===
Sets 10701, 10702, and 10708
	← Yokohama Ebina, Shonandai →									
Car No.	1	2	3	4	5	6	7	8	9	10
Designation	10700 (Tc2)	10200 (M2)	10100 (M1)	10600 (T1)	10300 (M3)	10600 (T2)	10600 (T1)	10200 (M2)	10100 (M1)	10500 (Tc1)
Equipment		SIV; CP	VVVF		VVVF			SIV; CP	VVVF	
Numbering	10701; 10702; 10708	10201; 10203; 10215	10101; 10103; 10115	10601; 10604; 10617	10301; 10302; 10303	10602; 10605; 10618	10603; 10606; 10619	10202; 10204; 10216	10102; 10104; 10116	10501; 10502; 10508

- Cars 3, 5, and 9 are each equipped with one single-arm pantograph.

=== 8-car sets ===
Sets 10703 to 10707
	← Yokohama Ebina, Shonandai →							
Car No.	1	2	3	4	5	6	7	8
Designation	10700 (Tc2)	10200 (M2)	10100 (M1)	10600 (T2)	10600 (T1)	10200 (M2)	10100 (M1)	10500 (Tc1)
Equipment		SIV; CP	VVVF			SIV; CP	VVVF	
Numbering	10703; 10704; 10705; 10706; 10707	10205; 10207; 10209; 10211; 10213	10105; 10107; 10109; 10111; 10113	10607; 10609; 10611; 10613; 10615	10608; 10610; 10612; 10614; 10616	10206; 10208; 10210; 10212; 10214	10106; 10108; 10110; 10112; 10114	10503; 10504; 10505; 10506; 10507

- Cars 2 and 7 are each equipped with one single-arm pantograph.

=== Key ===
- VVVF: Variable frequency drive
- SIV: Static inverter
- CP: Compressor

== Interior ==
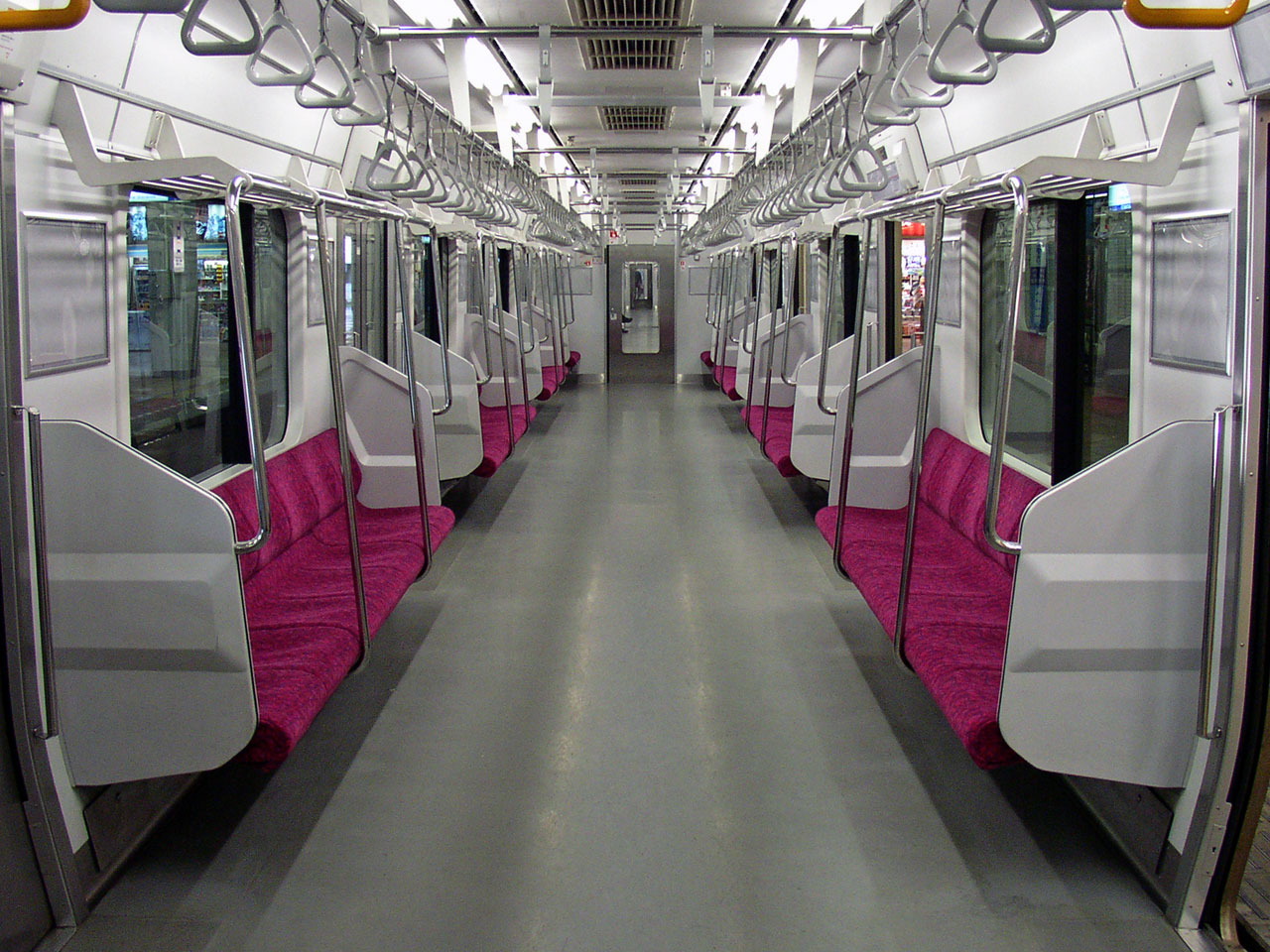
Interior view

== Special liveries ==
In April 2024, Sotetsu announced that two 10000 series sets would receive retro-styled liveries: set 10705 received a "Nostalgic Wakakusa" livery based on the fleet's original livery, and set 10708 received a "Classic Red Stripe" livery based on Sotetsu's legacy red livery. The two sets returned to revenue service on 18 May 2024, and they were scheduled to carry the liveries until November.

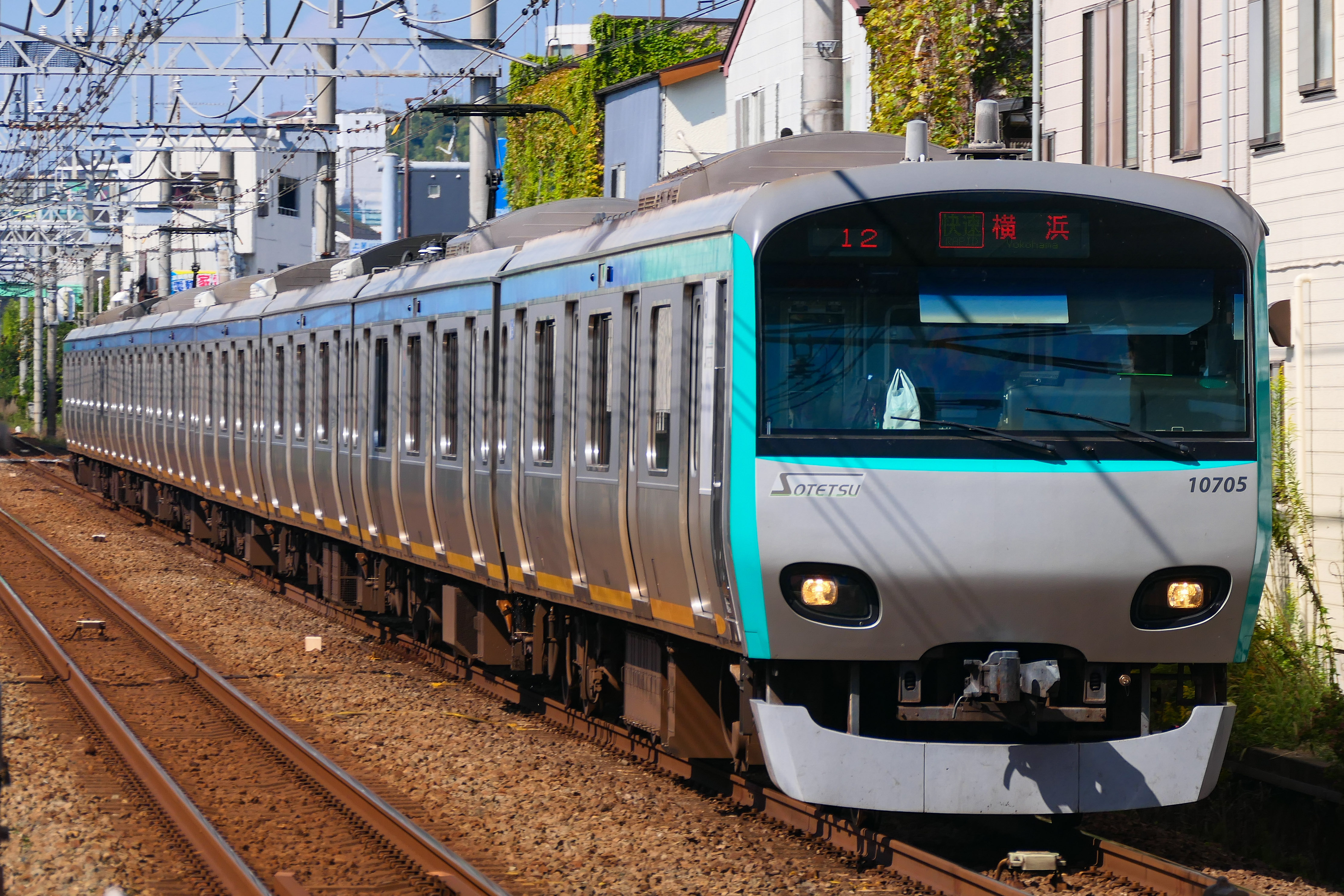
Set 10705 with "Nostalgic Wakasuka" special livery, October 2024

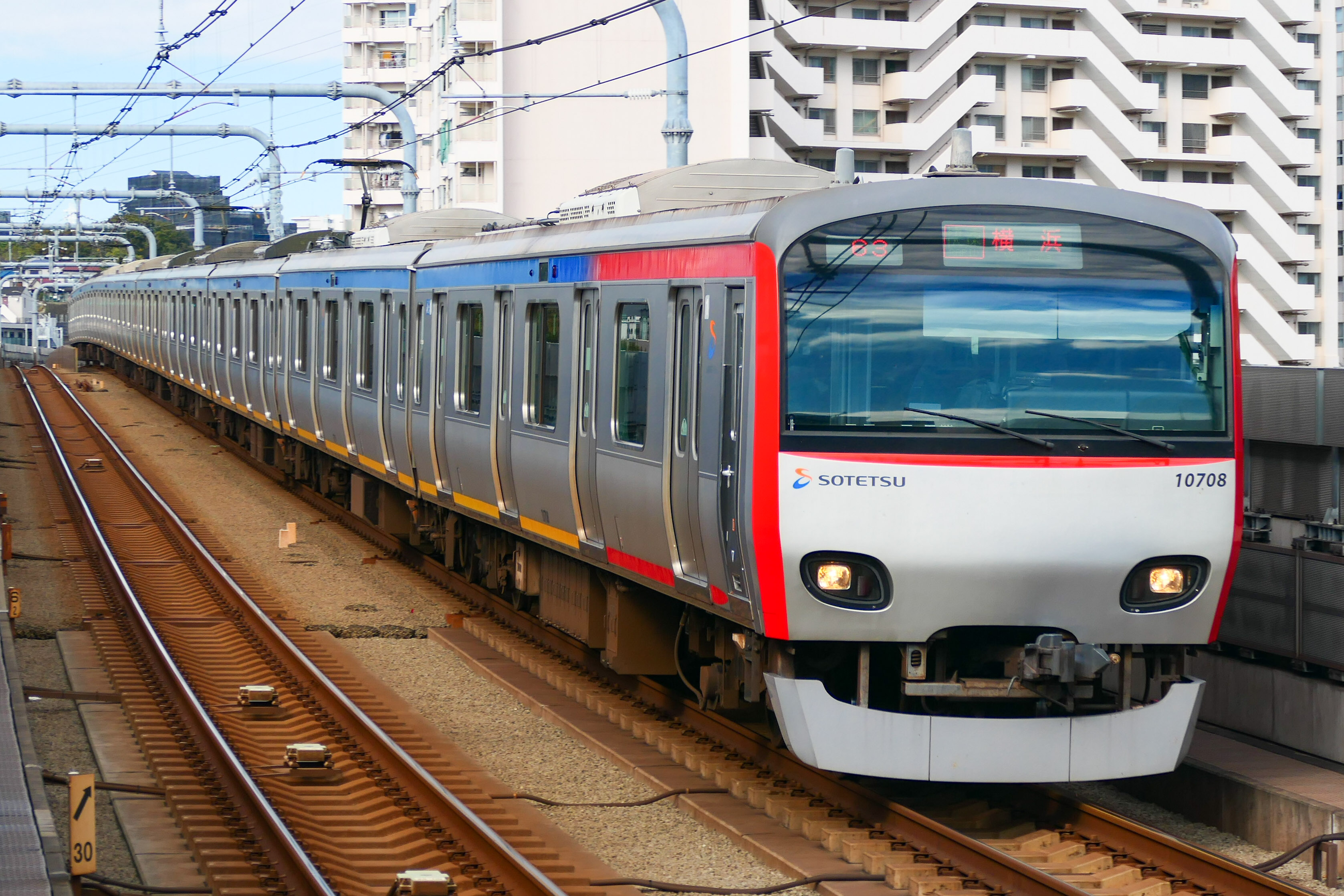
Set 10708 with "classic red stripe" special livery, November 2024

== Refurbishment ==
In 2020, 10-car set 10701 received restyled front ends, an all-over "Yokohama Navy Blue" livery, full-colour LED destination displays, and a renovated interior. Sets 10702 and 10703 received a less extensive treatment, which only affected front-end styling and onboard equipment.

Sotetsu announced in April 2024 that three further sets will be refurbished.

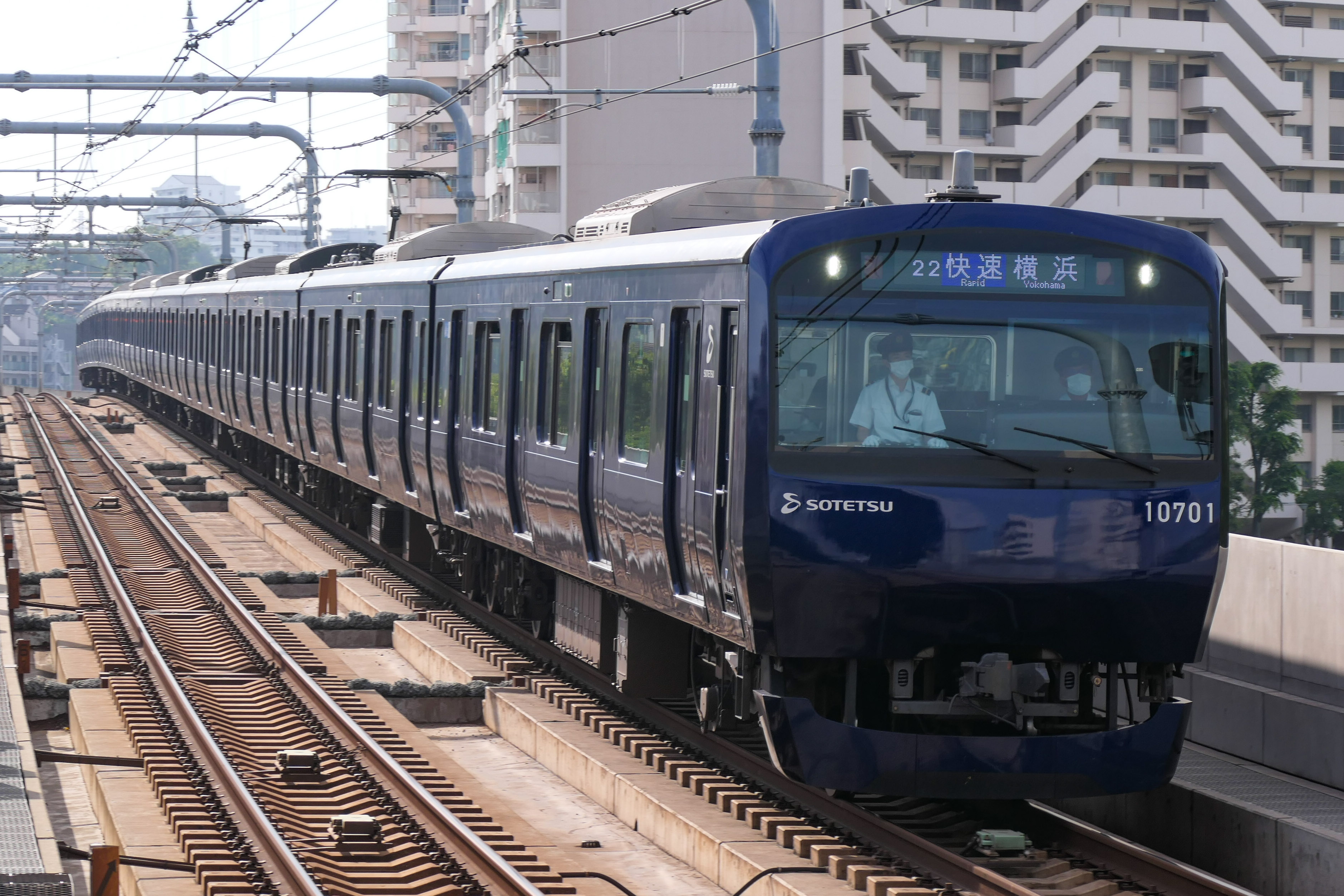
Set 10701 with "Yokohama Navy Blue" livery and restyled front end

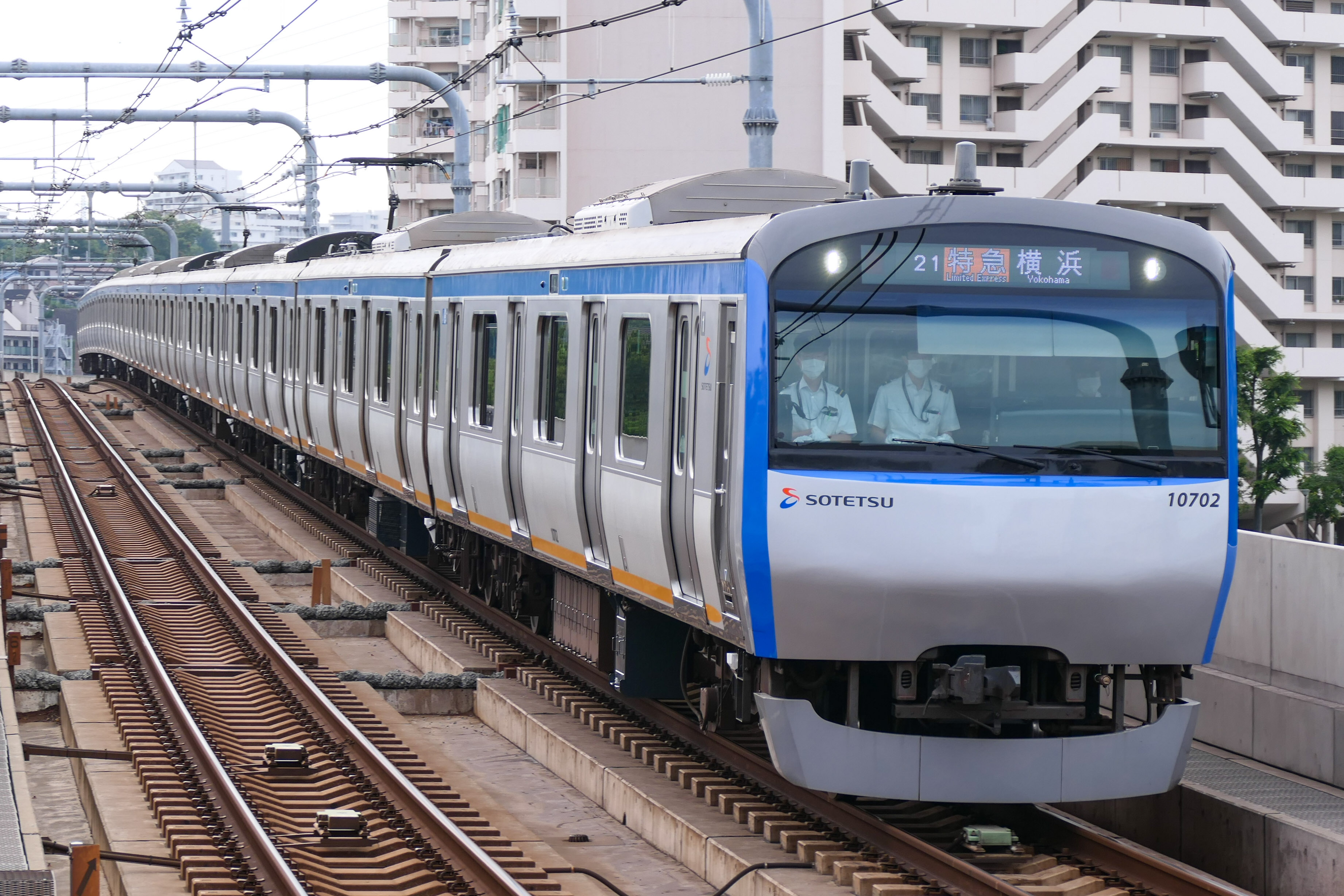
Set 10702 with restyled front end only

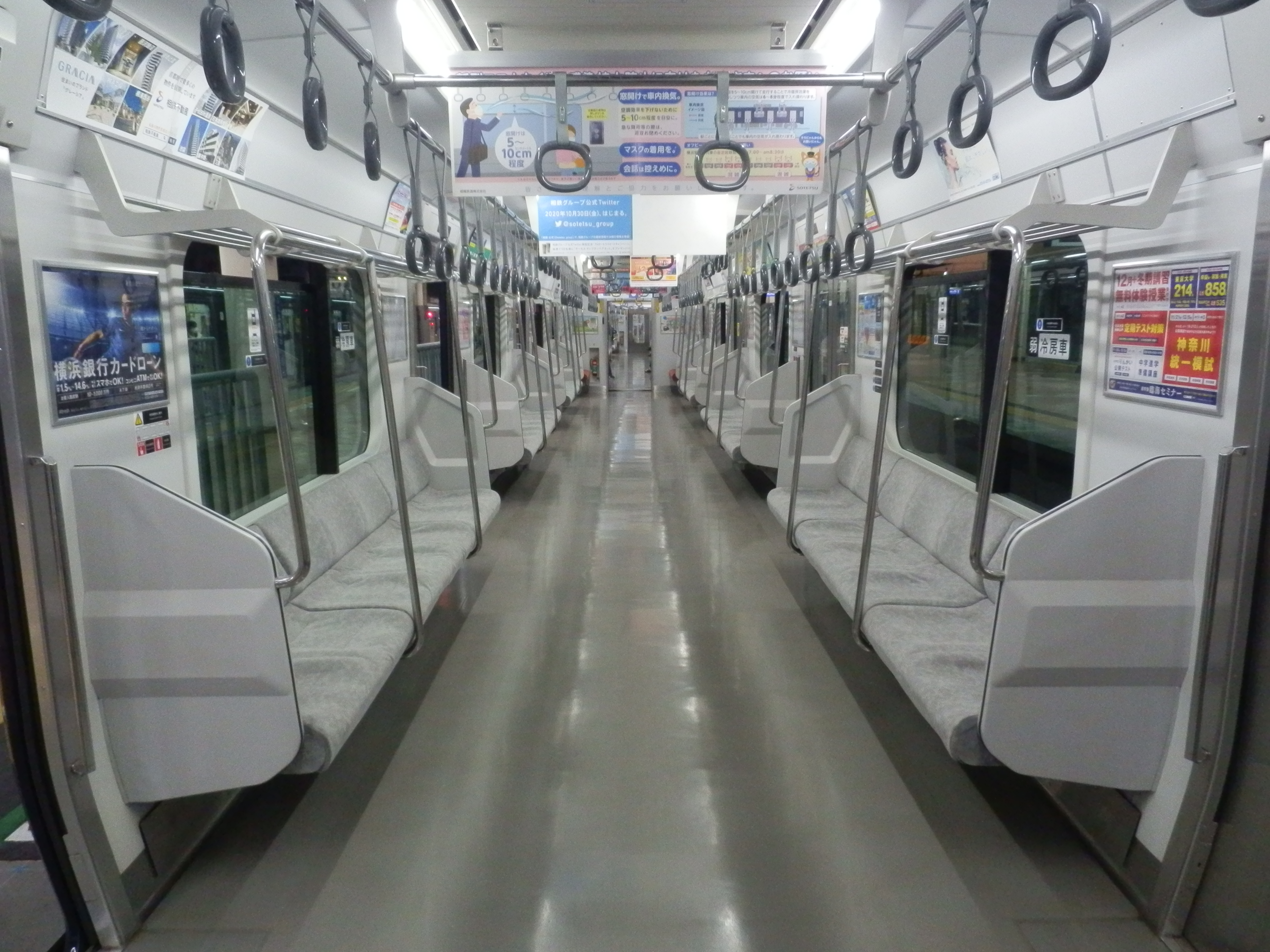
Refurbished interior
