= Sagami Railway =

Railway company in Kanagawa Prefecture, Japan

Sagami Railway Co., Ltd
- Native name: 相模鉄道株式会社
- Type: Public KK (Sotetsu Holdings)
- Traded as: TYO: 9003 (Sotetsu Holdings)
- Genre: Rail transport
- Founded: November 1964
- Headquarters: 2-9-14 Kitasaiwai, Nishi-ku, Yokohama, Japan
- Area served: Kanagawa
- Key people: Hideyuki Takizawa (President)
- Services: Passenger railway
- Owner: Odakyu Electric Railway Co. (4.38%); Obayashi Corporation (1.31%); T&D Holdings (0.65%); Keikyu (0.54%); Takashimaya (0.54%); Keio Corporation (0.10%); Tokyu Construction (0.01%)
- Number of employees: 1,117 (As of September 16, 2009)
- Parent: Sotetsu Holdings, Inc.
- Website: https://www.sotetsu.co.jp/about/companies/sagami-railway/

Sagami Railway Company, Ltd. (相模鉄道株式会社, Sagami tetsudō Kabushikigaisha), or Sōtetsu (Note: Official English documents and signage generally drop the long vowel diacritic, so "Sōtetsu" is instead spelled "Sotetsu". This article uses the diacritic for pronunciation clarity.) (相鉄), is a private railway company operating three lines in Kanagawa Prefecture, Japan. It is a wholly owned subsidiary of holding company Sōtetsu Holdings, Inc. Sōtetsu Holdings is listed on the Tokyo Stock Exchange; 6.58% of it is owned by the Odakyu Electric Railway Company.

== Overview ==
Sagami Railway is one of the core companies of the Sōtetsu group. Sōtetsu focuses on railway operations, although formerly it had a more diversified set of holdings, such as bus lines and supermarkets. Sōtetsu is the smallest company of the "Big 15" private railways in Japan, as it has only short lines, but it succeeded in developing towns along its lines in the 1960s and 1970s, with many passengers riding this line. In May 1990, Sōtetsu joined the major railways. In 2010 it had a daily ridership of 623,500

== Lines ==
Sōtetsu Lines (dark blue) in the railway network around Yokohama

The company operates three passenger (commuter) lines and a freight-only line. All lines are electrified. All the railroads owned or operated by Sōtetsu are entirely within Kanagawa Prefecture, but through services with other rail operators allow Sōtetsu trains to travel into Tokyo Metropolis and Saitama Prefecture.

=== Passenger ===
- Sōtetsu Main Line from Yokohama Station in Yokohama to Ebina Station in Ebina via Futamata-gawa Station in Yokohama, 18 stations, 24.6 km (15.3 mi)
- Sōtetsu Izumino Line from Futamata-gawa Station in Yokohama to Shōnandai Station in Fujisawa, 8 stations, 11.3 km (7.0 mi)
- Sōtetsu Shin-yokohama Line from Nishiya to Shin-yokohama, 3 stations, 6.3 km (3.9 mi). Unlike the other lines, this line is owned by Japan Railway Construction, Transport and Technology Agency (JRTT) with operation commissioned to Sōtetsu.

=== Freight ===
- Atsugi Line (厚木線, Atsugi-sen) in Ebina

== Rolling stock ==
As of 1 April 2026, Sōtetsu operates the following electric multiple unit (EMU) train types.

- 8000 series EMUs (introduced 1990)
- 9000 series EMUs (introduced 1993)
- 10000 series EMUs (introduced 2002)
- 11000 series EMUs (introduced 2009)
- 12000 series EMUs (introduced 20 April 2019)
- 13000 series EMUs (introduced 30 March 2026)
- 20000 series EMUs (introduced 11 February 2018)
- 700 series 2-car EMUs modified in 2006 from 7000 series for use as an inspection and rescue train
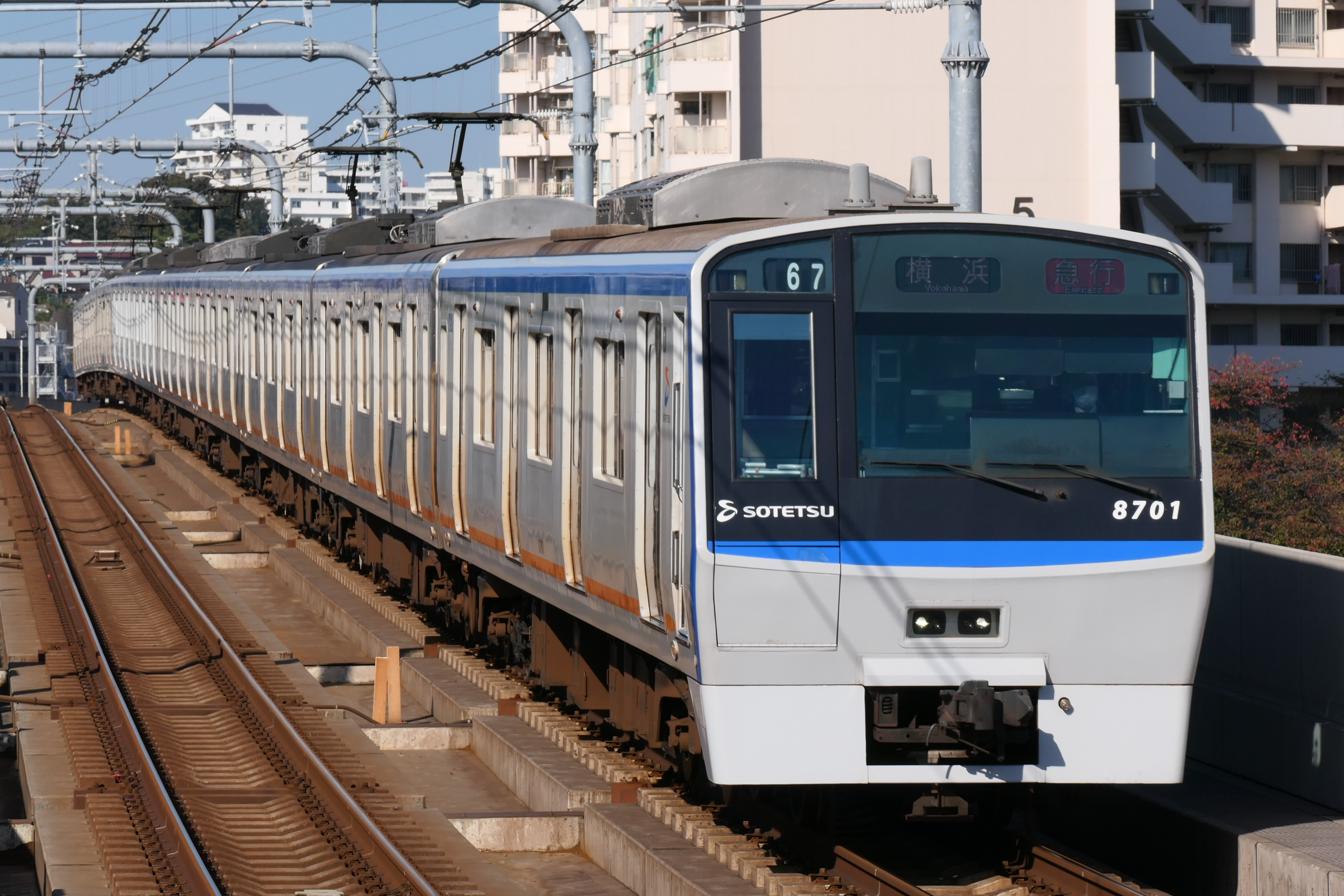
An 8000 series EMU in revised livery in October 2020

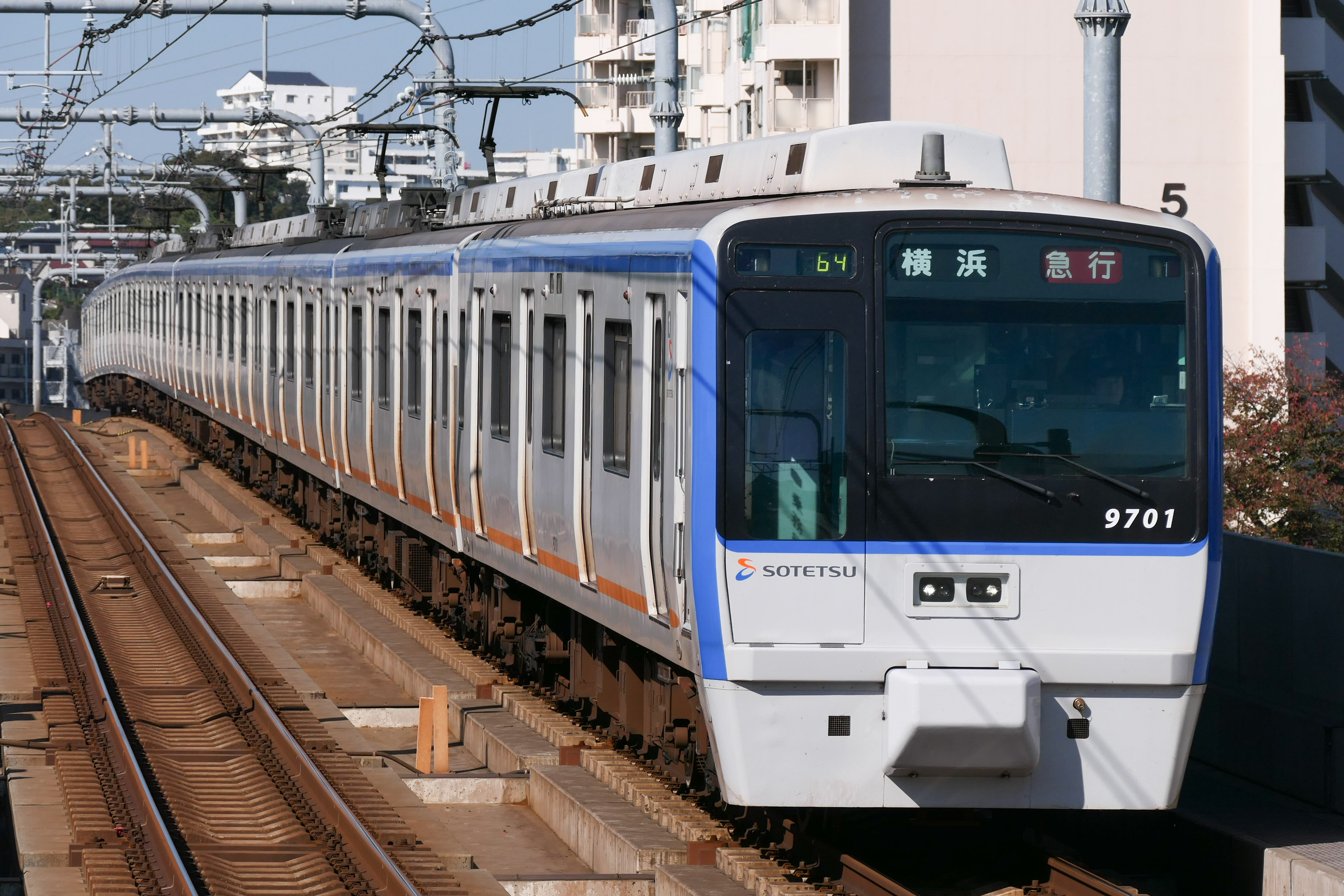
A 9000 series EMU in revised color scheme in October 2020

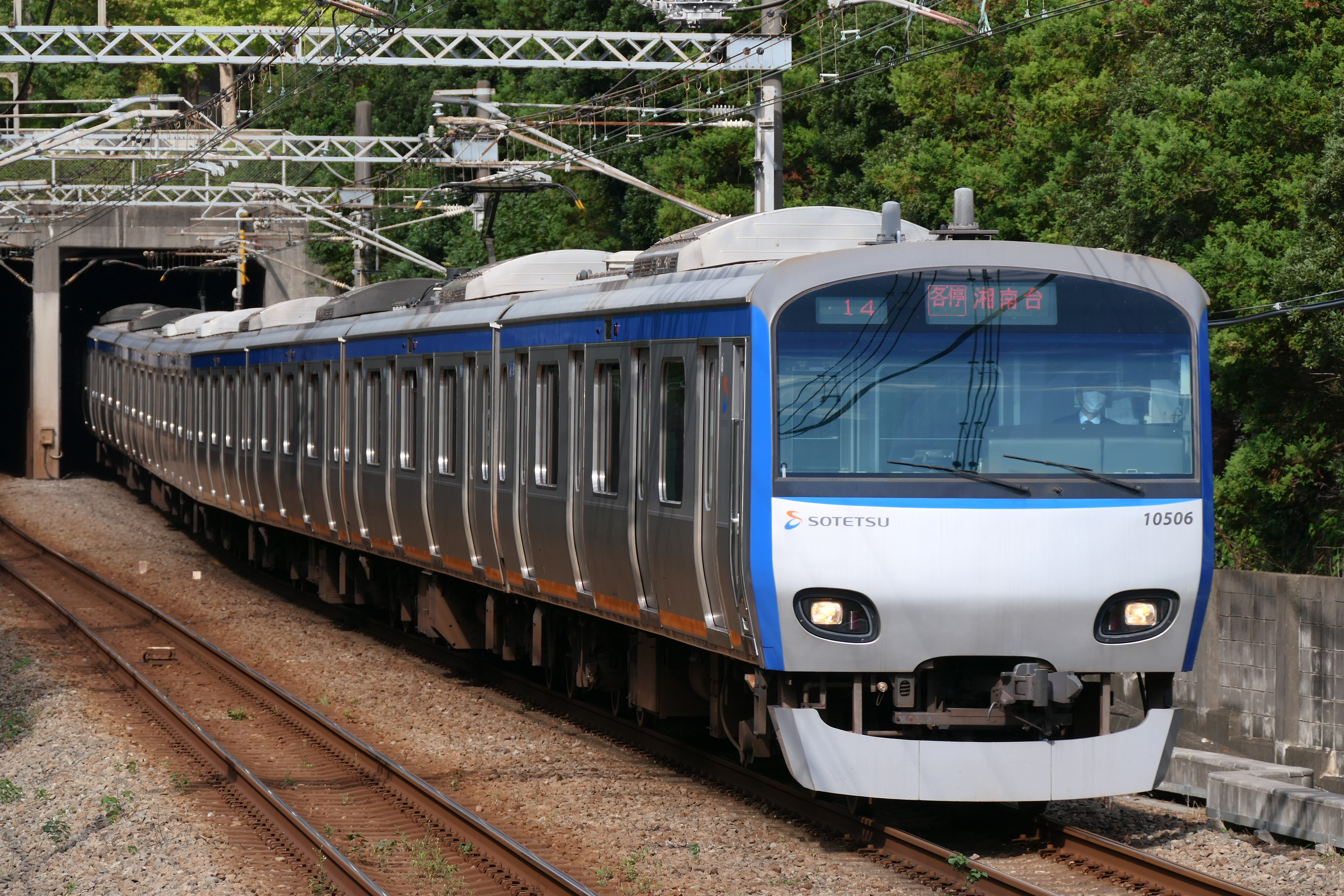
A 10000 series EMU in October 2020

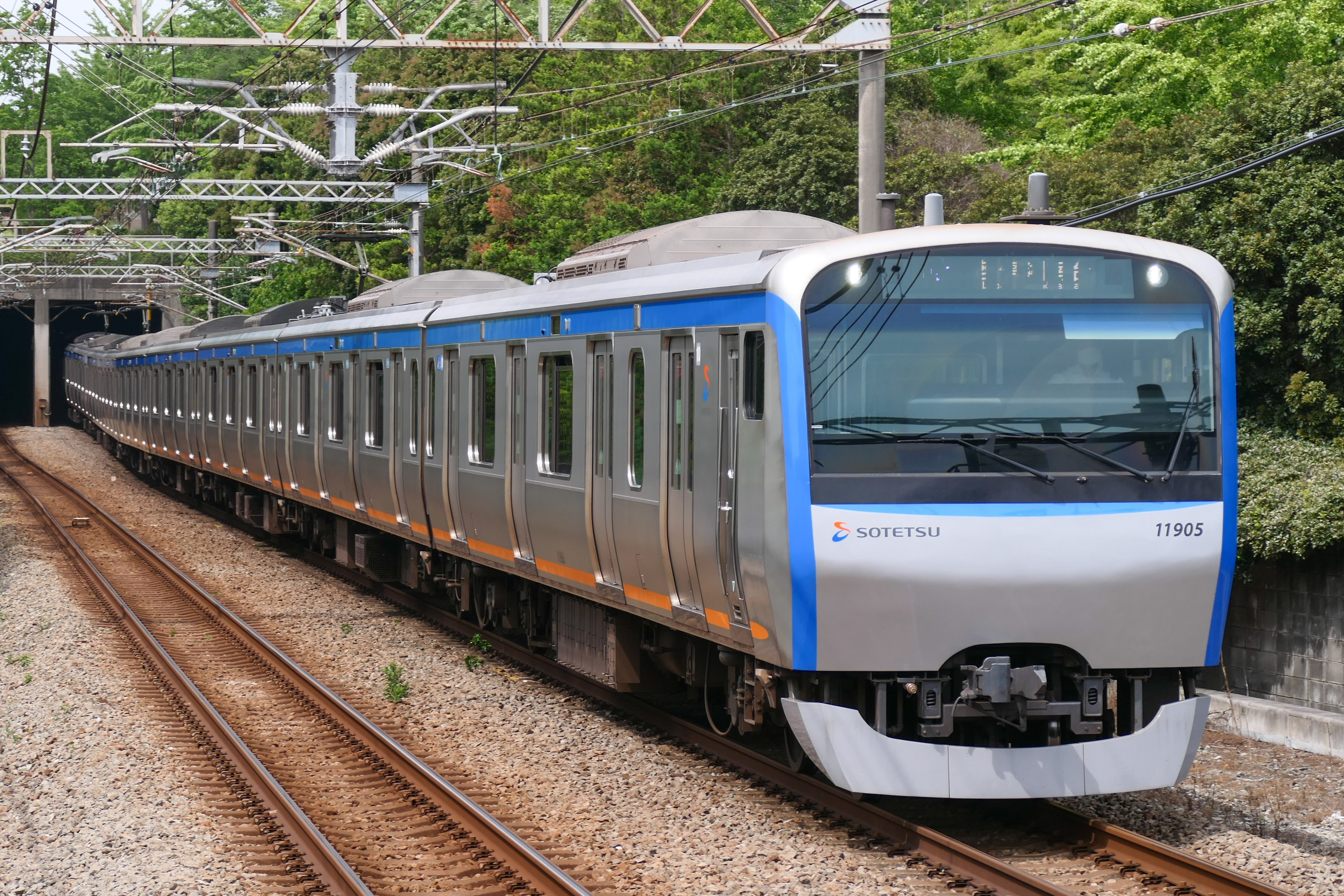
An 11000 series EMU in May 2021

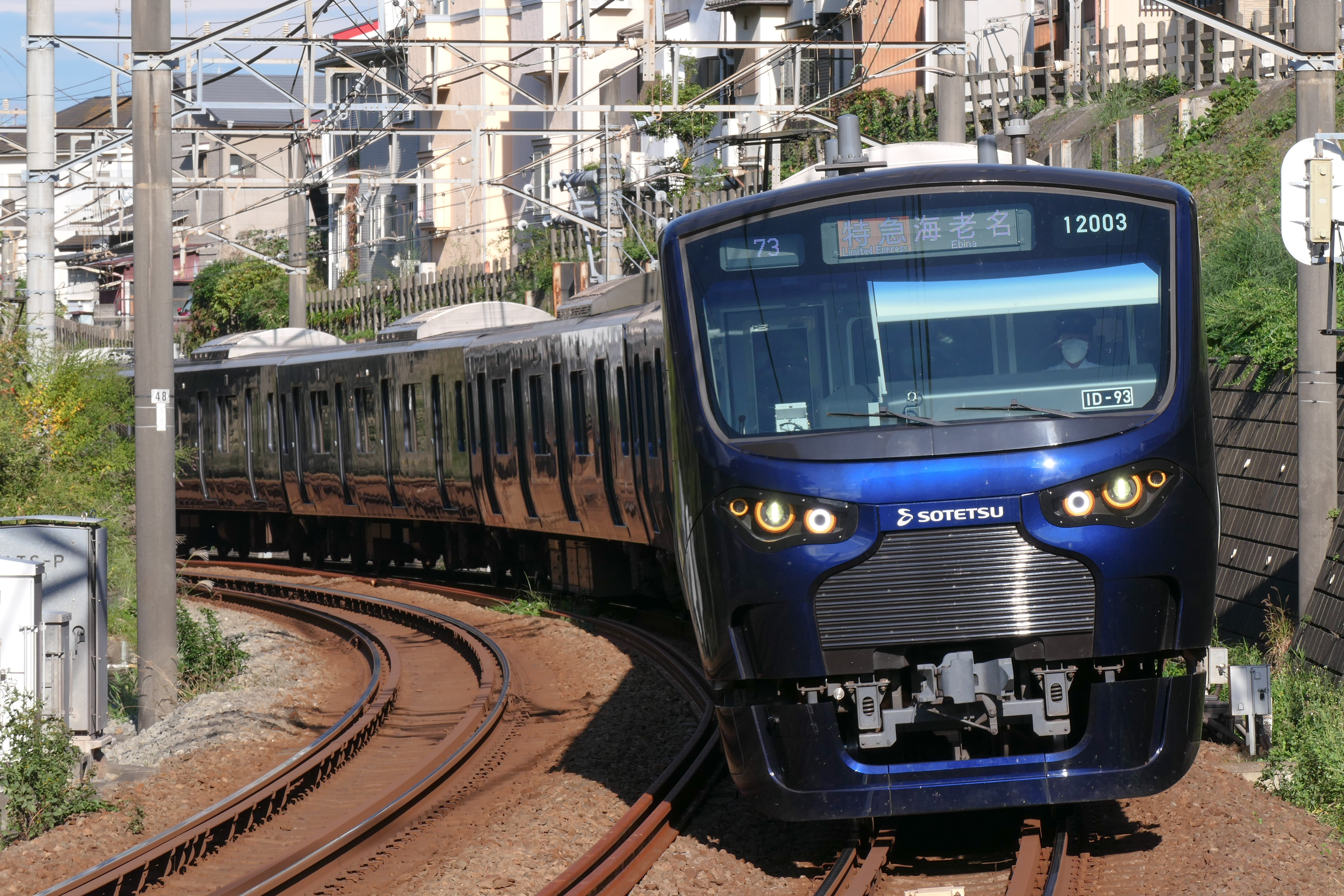
A 12000 series EMU in October 2020

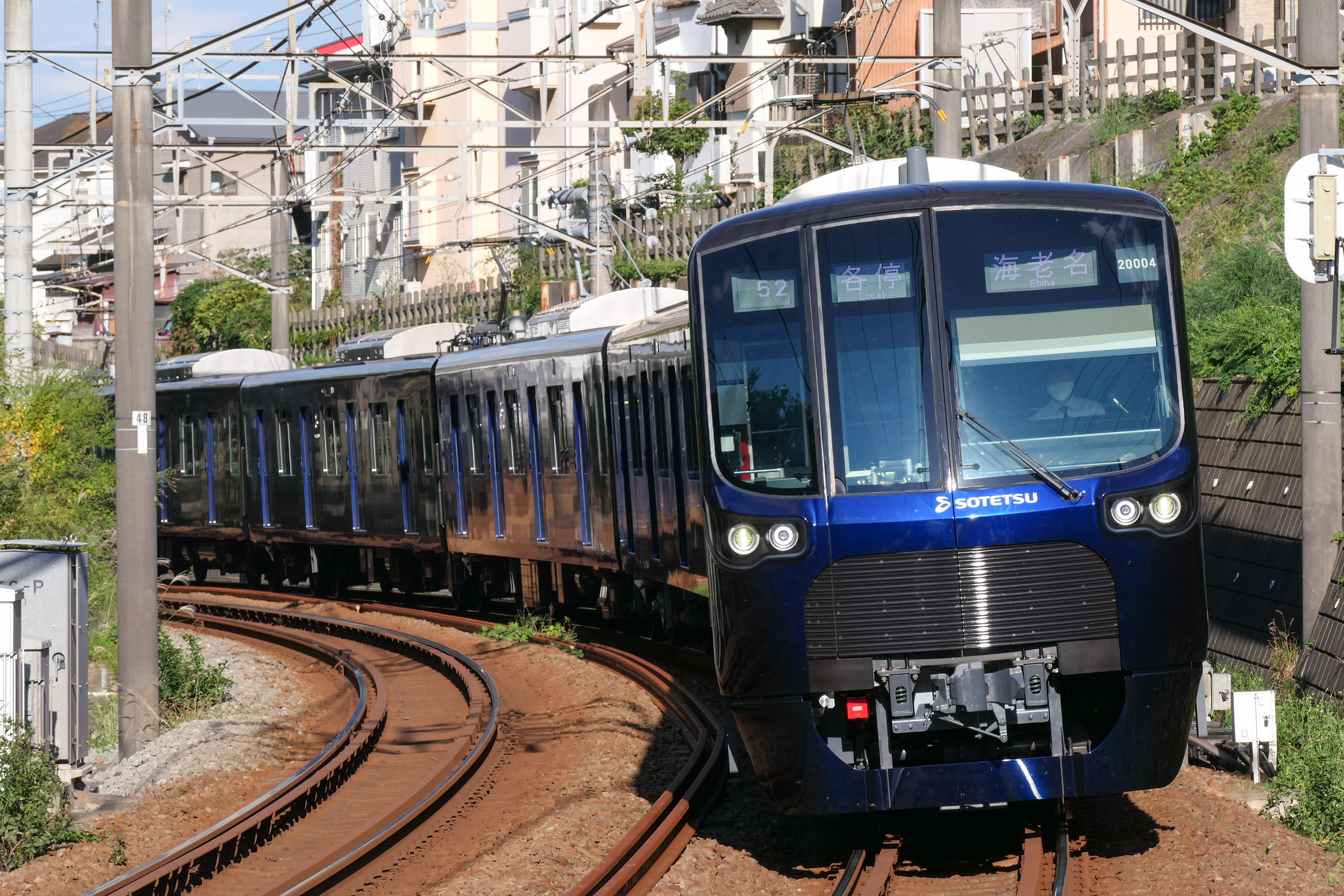
A 20000 series EMU in October 2020

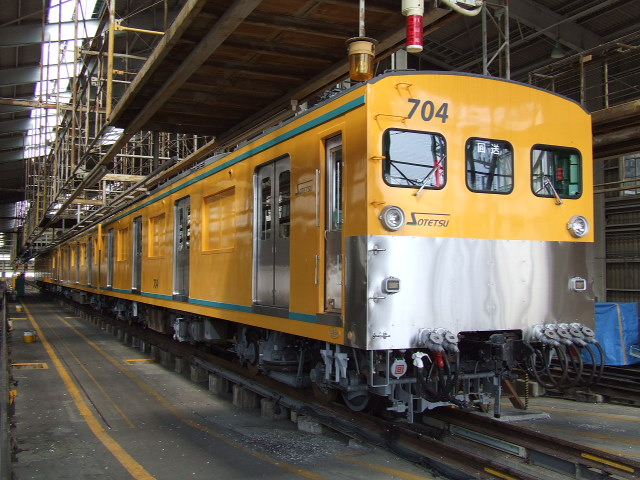
A 700 series inspection and rescue train

Further 20000 series trains will be delivered ahead of the start of inter-running services to and from Tokyu Corporation lines scheduled to commence in late fiscal 2022.

=== Past ===
==== EMUs ====
- 1000 series
- 2000 and 2100 series EMU (introduced 1951)
- 3000 series EMU (introduced 1951)
- 5000 series EMU (introduced 1955)
- 6000 and New 6000 series EMU (introduced 1961)
- 7000 and New 7000 series EMUs (introduced 1975)

==== Locomotives ====
- Class ED10 electric locomotive

=== Preserved fleet ===
Some withdrawn rolling stock is preserved at Kashiwadai depot.

- 2000 series EMU car 2005
- 6000 series EMU cars 6001 and 6021
- ED10 electric locomotive No. 11
- Jinchu Railway Class 3 steam locomotive
- Jinchu Railway Class Ha20 coach
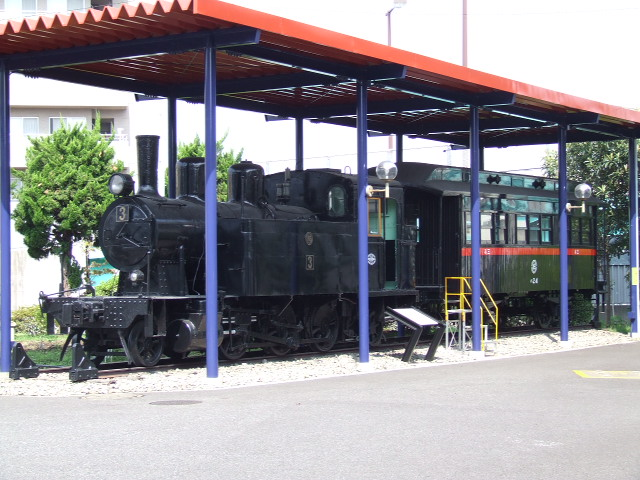
Preserved Jinchu Railway steam locomotive and coach

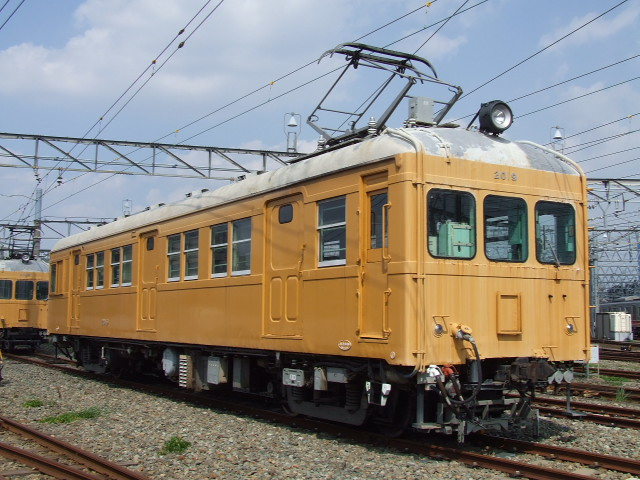
2000 series in September 2009

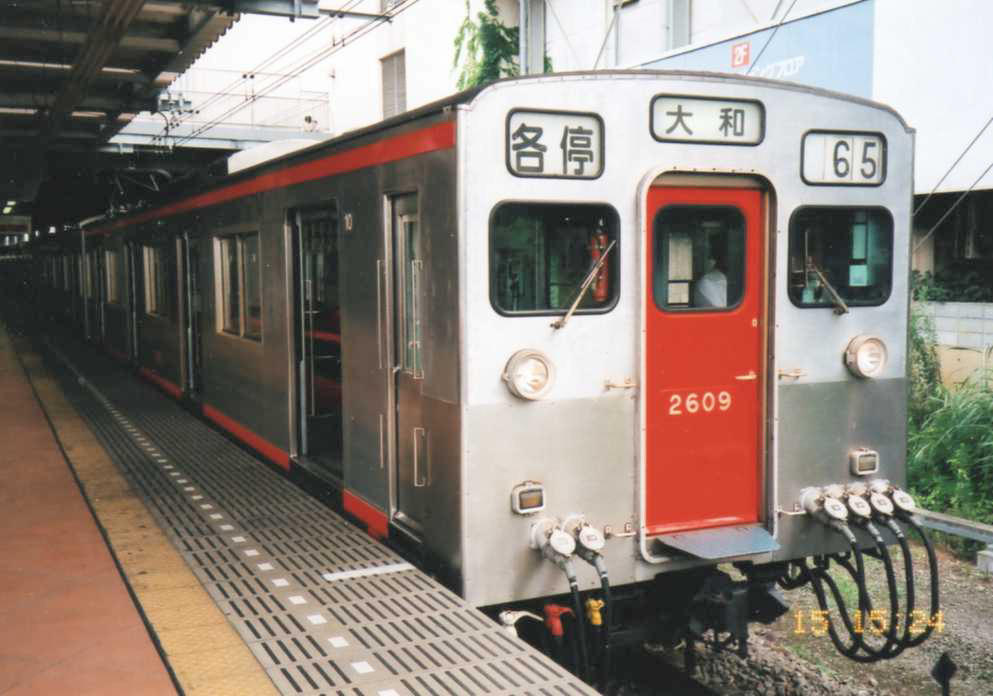
2100 series

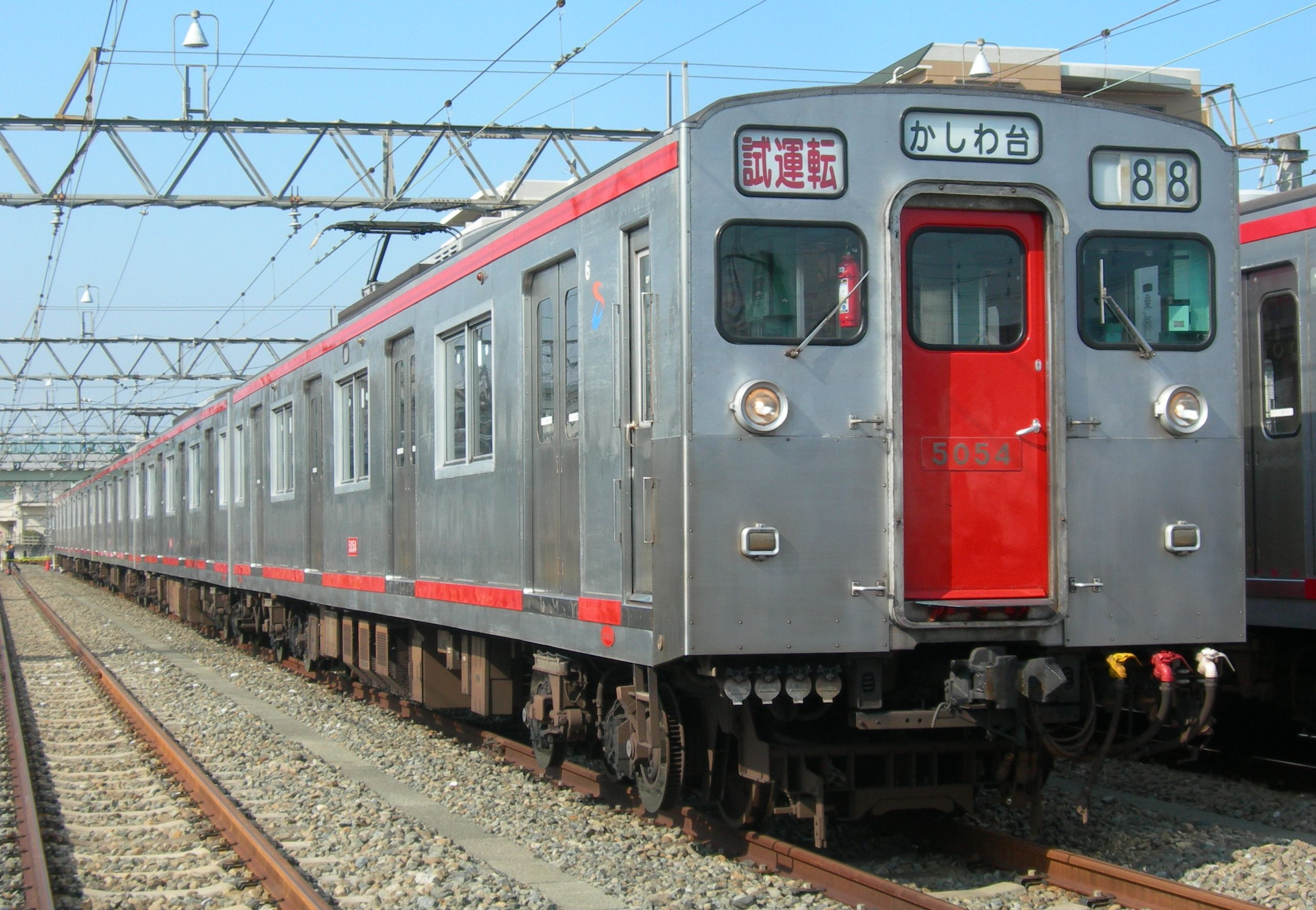
5000 series in February 2009

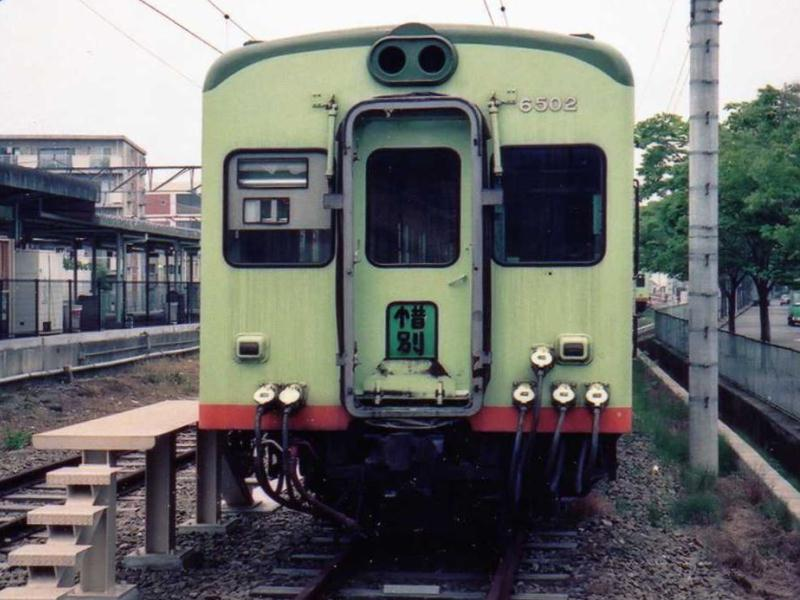
6000 series cars in revised color scheme awaiting scrapping in June 1993

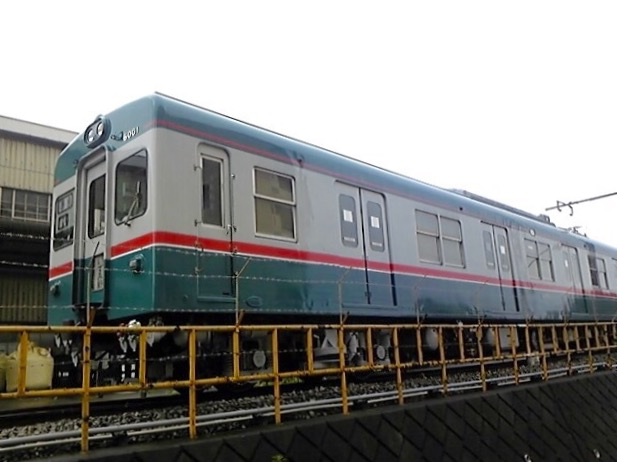
Preserved 6000 series car in original livery in June 2009

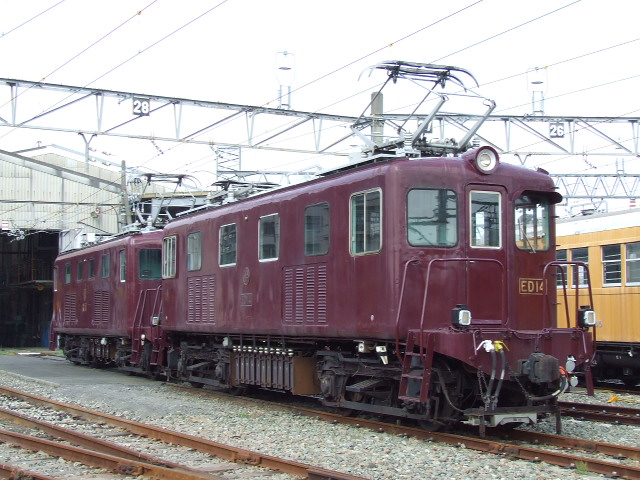
Class ED10 electric locomotive

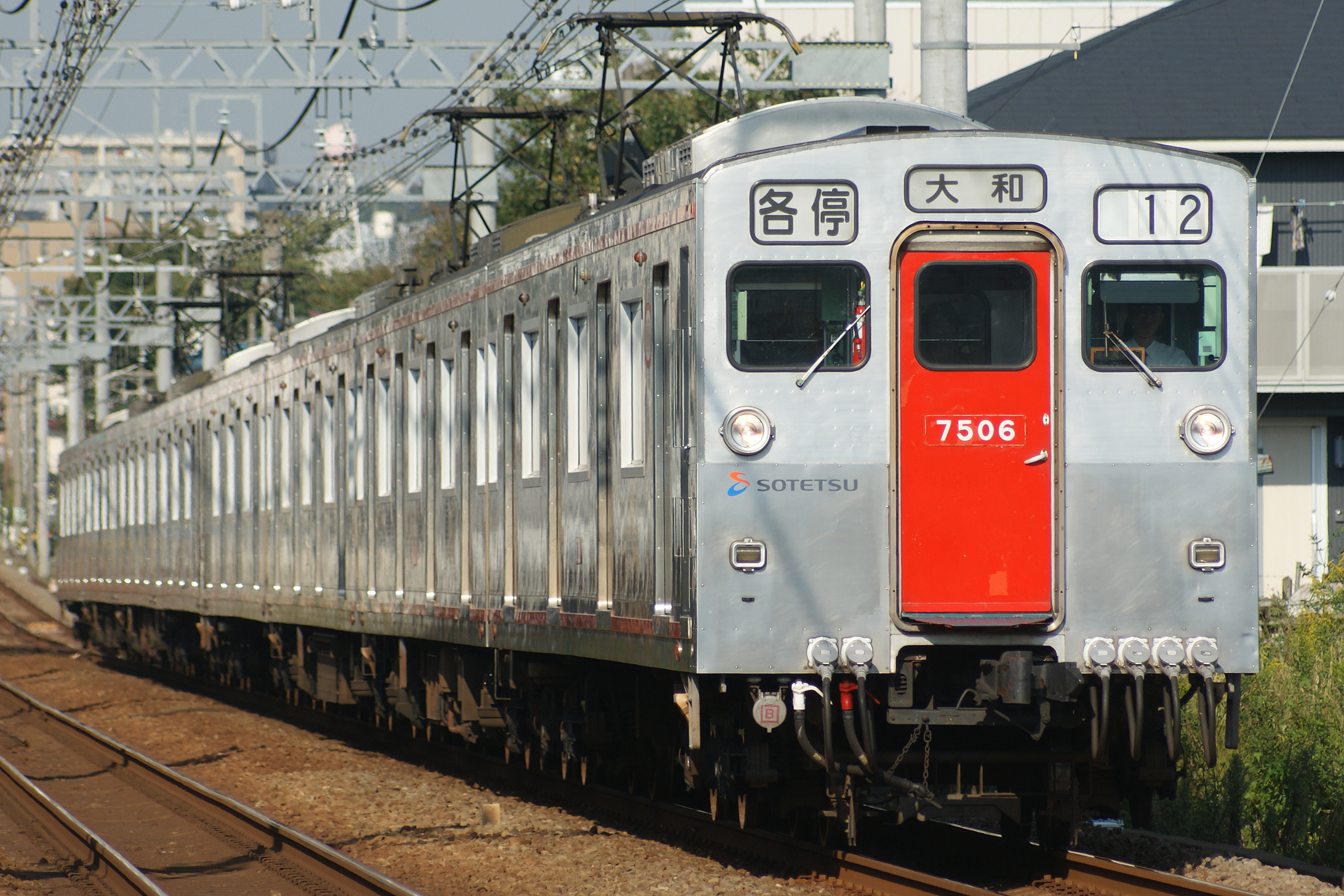
A 7000 series EMU in original livery October 2008

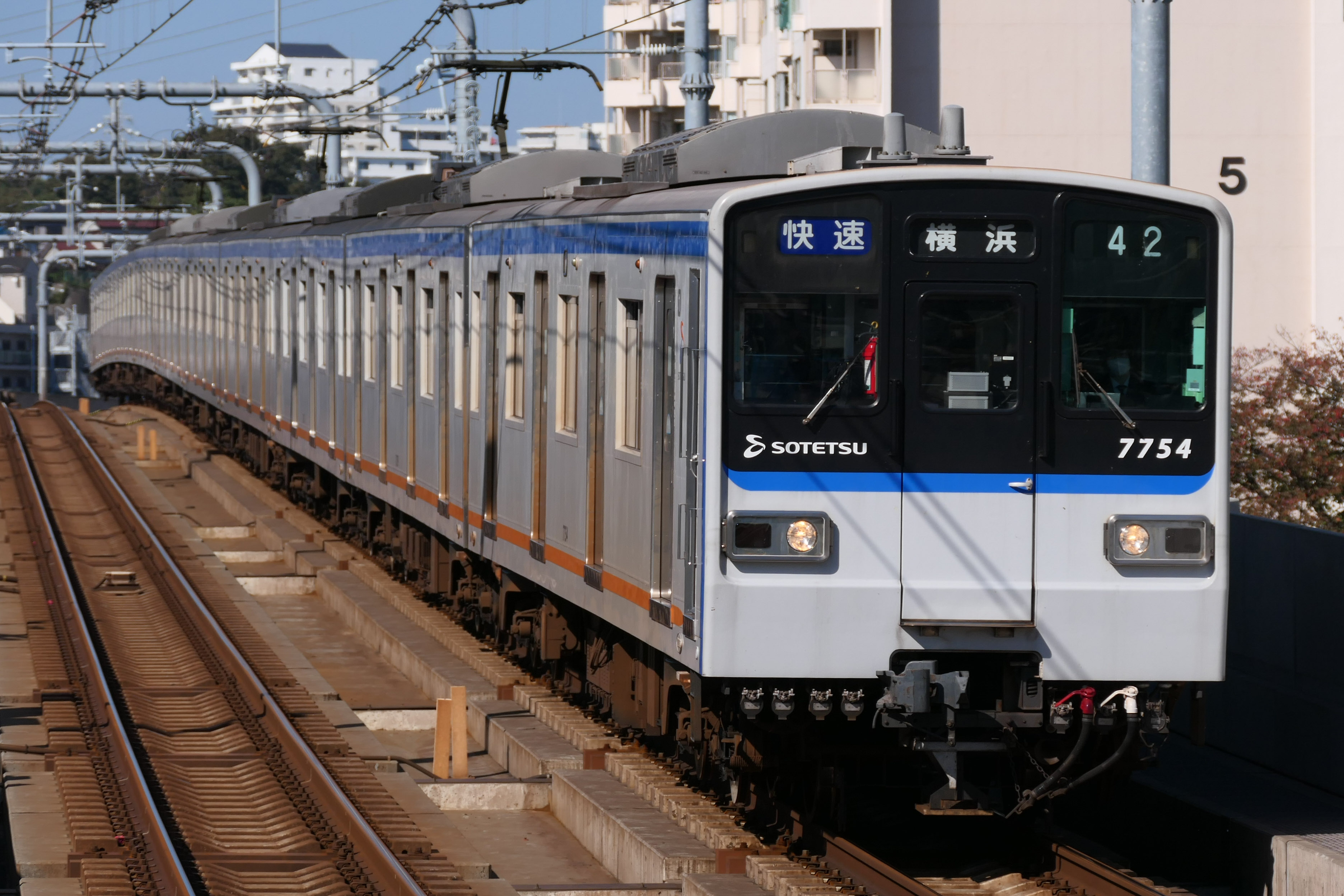
A New 7000 series EMU in revised livery in October 2020

== History ==
The Sagami Railway was established in Chigasaki, Kanagawa, in January 1917, to transport gravel along the Sagami River valley. The first section, between Chigasaki and Samukawa, was opened in 1919, and the line was gradually extended to Hashimoto in 1931. Sagami Railway started direct operation to Hachiōji, but performance was sluggish during the economic depression, and an outflow disaster of Sagami River severely damaged its gravel pits in 1941. This led to Sagami Railway's eventual decision to become a subsidiary of Tōkyū in 1941.

The Jinchū Railway (神中鉄道) was established in Seya village (now, Seya-ku, Yokohama) in 1917 and opened its first section from Futamata-gawa to Atsugi in May 1926. Jinchū Railway extended to Yokohama Station in 1933, but its management faced financial difficulties, so the company also became a subsidiary of Tōkyū in 1939, prior to Sagami Railway. The two companies' rail lines were connected at Atsugi Station.

In April 1943, acknowledged by Tōkyū, Sagami Railway took over Jinchū Railway and named the two lines "Sagami Line" (original section) and "Jinchū Line" (acquired section). However, in June 1944 during World War II, the Sagami Line and its Nishi-Samukawa branch line were forcefully acquired by the government to use as a bypass between the Hachikō Line and Chūō Main Line in anticipation of airstrikes on heavy industrial facilities around the area. Sagami Line would never return to the hands of Sagami Railway. At the same time, Imperial Japanese Navy Atsugi Airport was opened, so the ridership and freight traffic increased sharply. As a result, Sagami Railway released all management and delegated it to Tōkyū. Under Tōkyū, the line gained electrification to increase the carrying capacity, and in 1944, all passenger lines were electrified.

In June 1947, Sagami Railway employees bought their own shares from Tōkyū and resolved the commission of the Jinchū Line (renamed as the "Tōkyū Atsugi Line" during Tōkyū's operation). Sagami Railway continued to develop the Jinchū/Atsugi Line, which became what is known today as the Sōtetsu Main Line. The whole line was fully double-tracked in 1951. In 1968, Sagami Railway began the construction of the Izumino Line. After completing the first extension of the Izumino Line in 1990, Sagami Railway was recognized as one of the "major private railway companies" (大手私鉄) in Japan by the Japan Private Railway Association, which gives Sagami Railway the qualification to participate in cabinet meetings and parliamentary hearings regarding public transportation policies.

In 1952, Sagami Railway purchased the 25,000 m^{2} of land around Yokohama Station's west entrance from Esso, and began to develop to attract department stores.

=== Through services to JR and Tōkyū ===
The Sōtetsu Shin-yokohama Line is an approximately 6 km link, which is constructed from Nishiya via Hazawa yokohama-kokudai to Shin-yokohama. This line enables through services between the JR East Saikyō Line and the Sōtetsu Main Line by late 2019, as well as between the Tōkyū Tōyoko Line, the Tōkyū Meguro Line and the Sōtetsu Main Line by March 2023. This project created a 12.7-kilometre (7.9 mi) railroad which allows residents and commuters alongside the Sōtetsu railway lines to better access the Tokyo Metropolis as well as Tokaido Shinkansen by interchanging at Shin-yokohama.
