= Sotetsu 6000 series =

Japanese train type

Sotetsu 6000 / New 6000 series
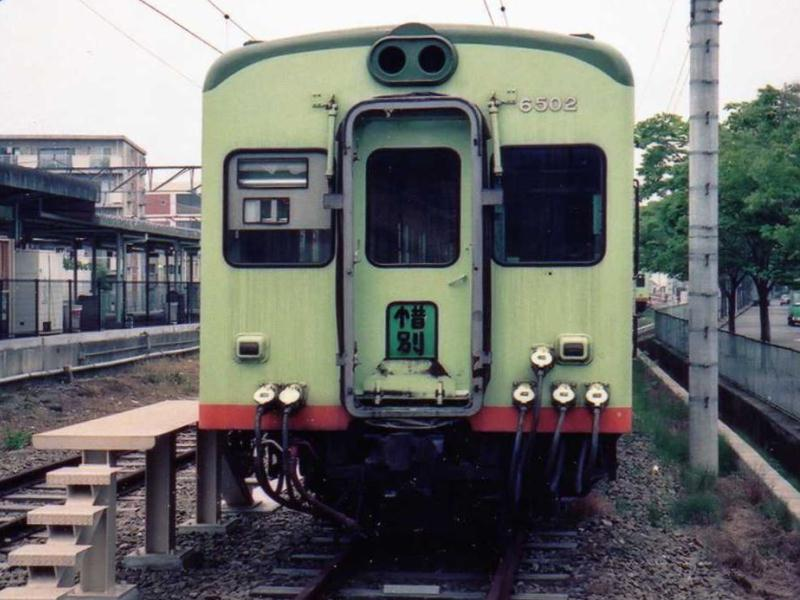
- 6000 series EMU in revised livery, 1993
- In service: 1961–2004
- Manufacturer: Hitachi
- Constructed: 1961–1974
- Number built: 190 cars
- Number in service: 0
- Operators: Sotetsu

Specifications
- Car body construction: Steel/aluminium
- Doors: 4 pairs per side
- Electric system(s): 1,500 V DC
- Bogies: Hitachi KH series
- Safety system(s): Sotetsu ATS
- Track gauge: 1,067 mm (3 ft 6 in)

The Sotetsu 6000 series (相鉄6000系) was an electric multiple unit (EMU) commuter train type operated by Sagami Railway (Sotetsu) in Japan between 1961 and 2004.

== Overview ==
Sagami Railway had made the Sotetsu 5000 series EMUs in 1955, but their short 18 meter frames were not large enough to carry the rapid increase of commuters that accompanied the Japanese post-war economic miracle. Considering this population growth and aging of the 5000 series, Sagami planned new EMUs with larger bodies and flexible formations.

== 6000 series ==
=== History ===
From 1961 to 1970, 110 6000 series train cars were built. Starting in 1990, the 6000 series began to be replaced by the Sotetsu 9000 series EMUs, with its last run taking place in 1997.

=== Body ===
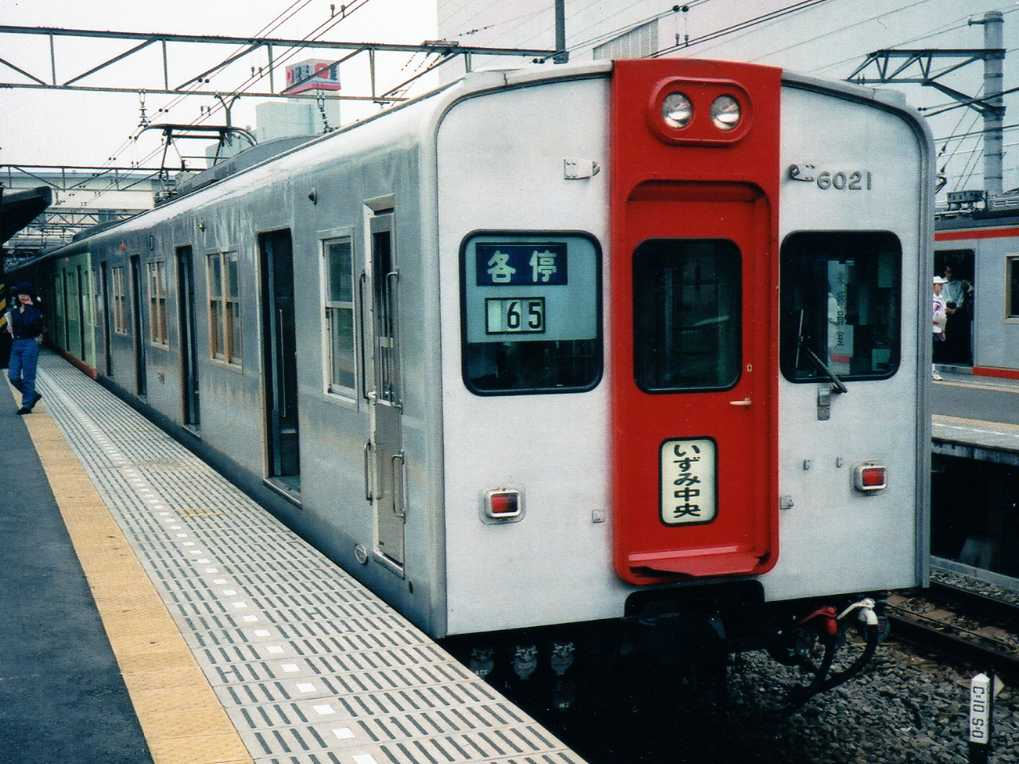
Lightweight body set 6021

The 6000 series was constructed with a 20-meter steel body. The No. 6021 prototype was successfully created and run using lightweight aluminum, which thereafter became the material of choice for many 6000 series body cars.

=== Traction ===
The motor power of the 6000 series is 110 kW.

=== Liveries ===
Sotetsu experimented with testing green and yellow colors for the trains. The green type was selected by voting within the company.

== New 6000 series ==
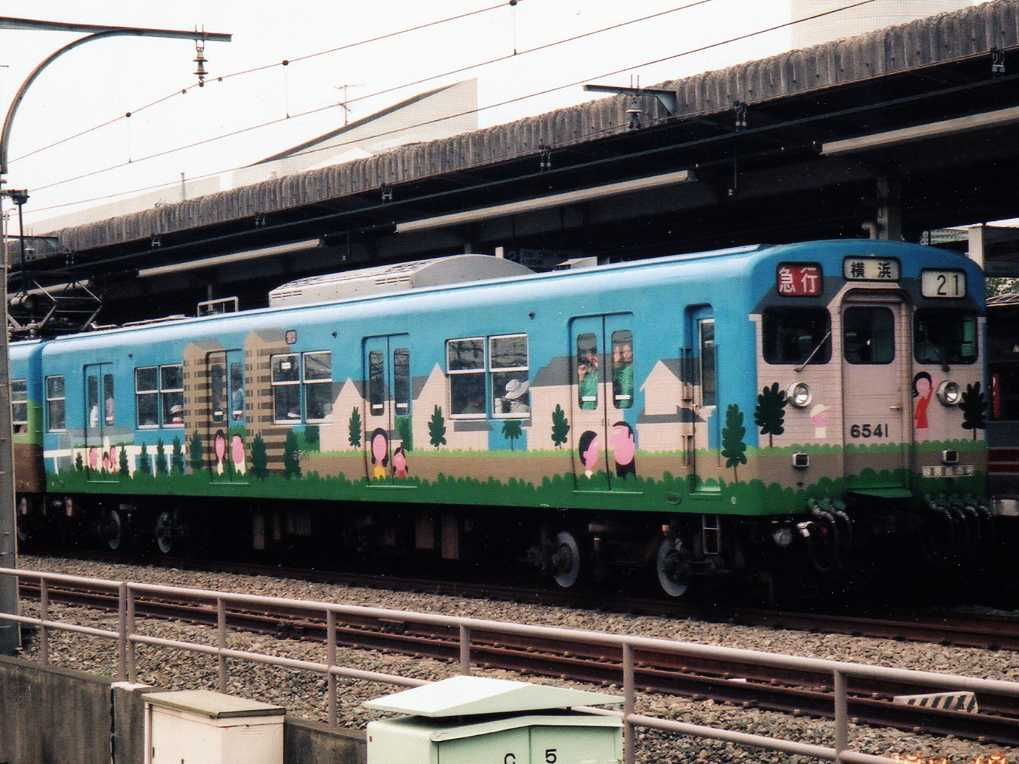
New 6000 series EMU, in Ryokuentoshi livery

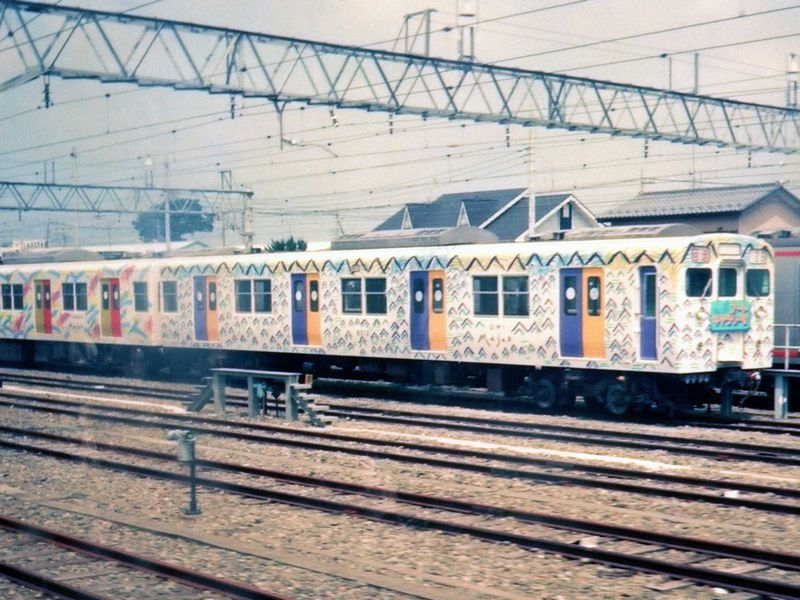
Art gallery livery

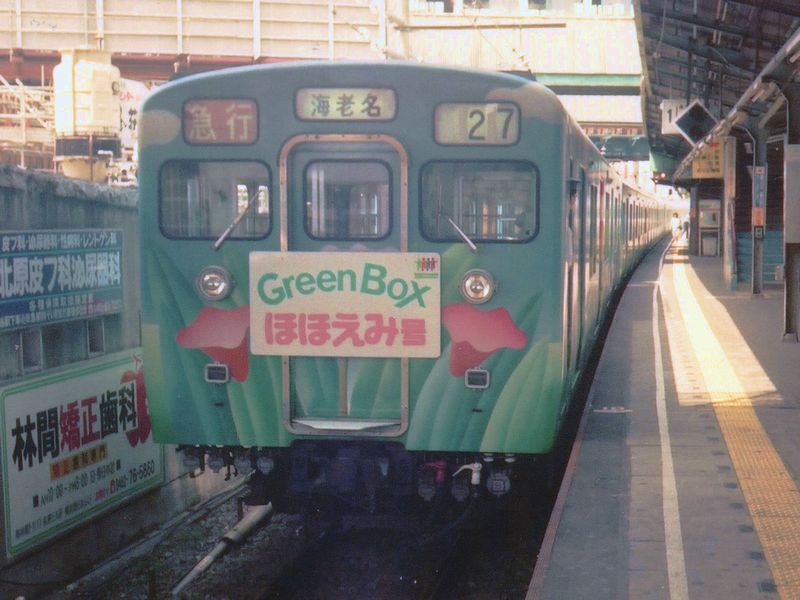
Hohoemi livery

=== History ===
From 1970 to 1974, 70 New 6000 series cars were made by Hitachi.

Starting in 1997, New 6000 series began to be replaced by the Sotetsu 8000, 9000, and 10000 series EMUs. The last use of the New 6000 series took place on 22 August 2003, with a special running of two trains on 12 November 2003.

=== Body ===
The body of the improved series was 20 m long and 2930 mm wide.

=== Interior design ===
The company began to adopt air conditioners in some of the New Series cars.

=== Motors ===
The motor power of the New Series is 130 kW.

=== Liveries ===
- Art gallery livery
- Ryokuentoshi livery - This name came from Ryokuentoshi new town along Izumino line in Yokohama.
- Hohoemi livery - Hohoemi in Japanese means "smile".
- Revival livery - Old original livery
- Green Box - Advertising train

== Preservation ==
6000 Series cars nos. 6001 and 6021 are preserved at Kashiwadai depot, while no New 6000 series vehicles have been retained.
