= Sotetsu 7000 series =

Japanese train type

Sotetsu 7000 and new 7000 series
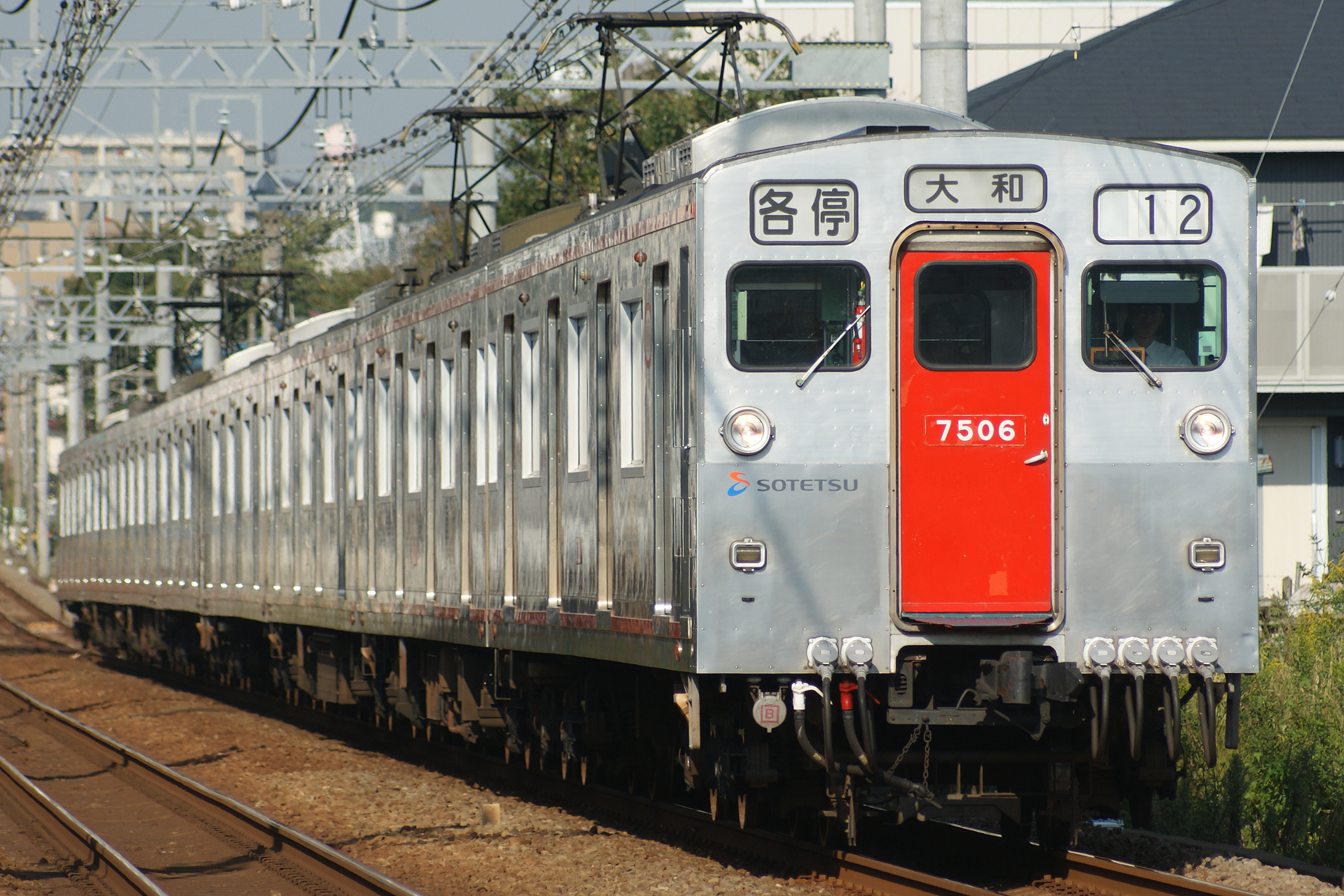
- 7000 series EMU in October 2008
- In service: 1975–2020
- Manufacturer: Hitachi Rail
- Number built: 140 cars
- Number in service: 4 cars 2 sets
- Number scrapped: 136 cars
- Formation: 2, 8 or 10 cars per set
- Operators: Sotetsu
- Depots: Kashiwadai

Specifications
- Car body construction: Aluminum
- Car length: 20 m (65 ft 7 in)
- Width: 2,800 mm (110 in)
- Doors: 4 pairs per side
- Maximum speed: 110 km/h (68.4 mph)
- Acceleration: 2.5 km/(h⋅s) (1.6 mph/s)
- Electric system(s): 1,500 V DC
- Current collector(s): Overhead
- Bogies: Hitachi KH series
- Braking system(s): Hitachi HSC
- Safety system(s): ATS-P
- Track gauge: 1,067 mm (3 ft 6 in)

The Sotetsu 7000 series (相鉄7000系) and Sotetsu New 7000 series (相鉄新7000系) were DC electric multiple unit (EMU) commuter train types operated by Sagami Railway (Sotetsu) in Kanagawa Prefecture, Japan. They were designed to operate as eight-car or ten-car sets.

== 7000 series ==
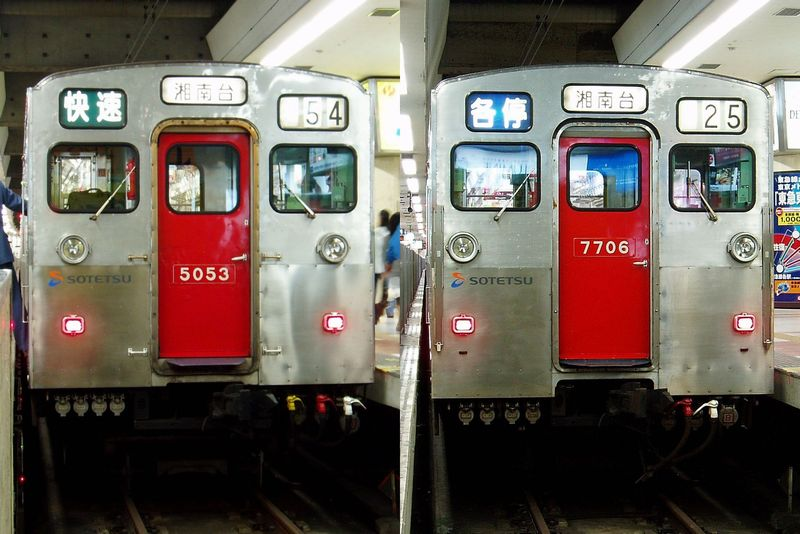
7000 series (right) and 5000 series EMUs

=== History ===
Built from 1975 by Hitachi in Yamaguchi Prefecture. A total of 80 cars were built, and withdrawn by 2019. Four cars were converted in 2006 and numbered 701–704, and used as measurement train as well as shunter.

=== Body ===
They had lightweight aluminum bodies, like the 5000 series and 2100 series EMUs.

Initially, 7700 (Tc), 7500 (Tc) and 7100 (M) cars were built. From 1983, 7000 (Mc) and 7600(T) cars were added to form 10-car and 8-car sets.

== New 7000 series ==
=== History ===
From 1986, the front-end design of the 7000 series was changed. To differentiate between the original 7000-series cars, those with the new design are referred to as the new 7000 series (新7000系). Some EMUs in this series use variable-frequency drive motors.

=== Operations ===
A total of 60 cars were built and initially operated only as ten-car sets, but some fleets were shortened to 8-car from 2006. All fleets have been replaced with 20000 series by 2020.

== Refurbishment ==
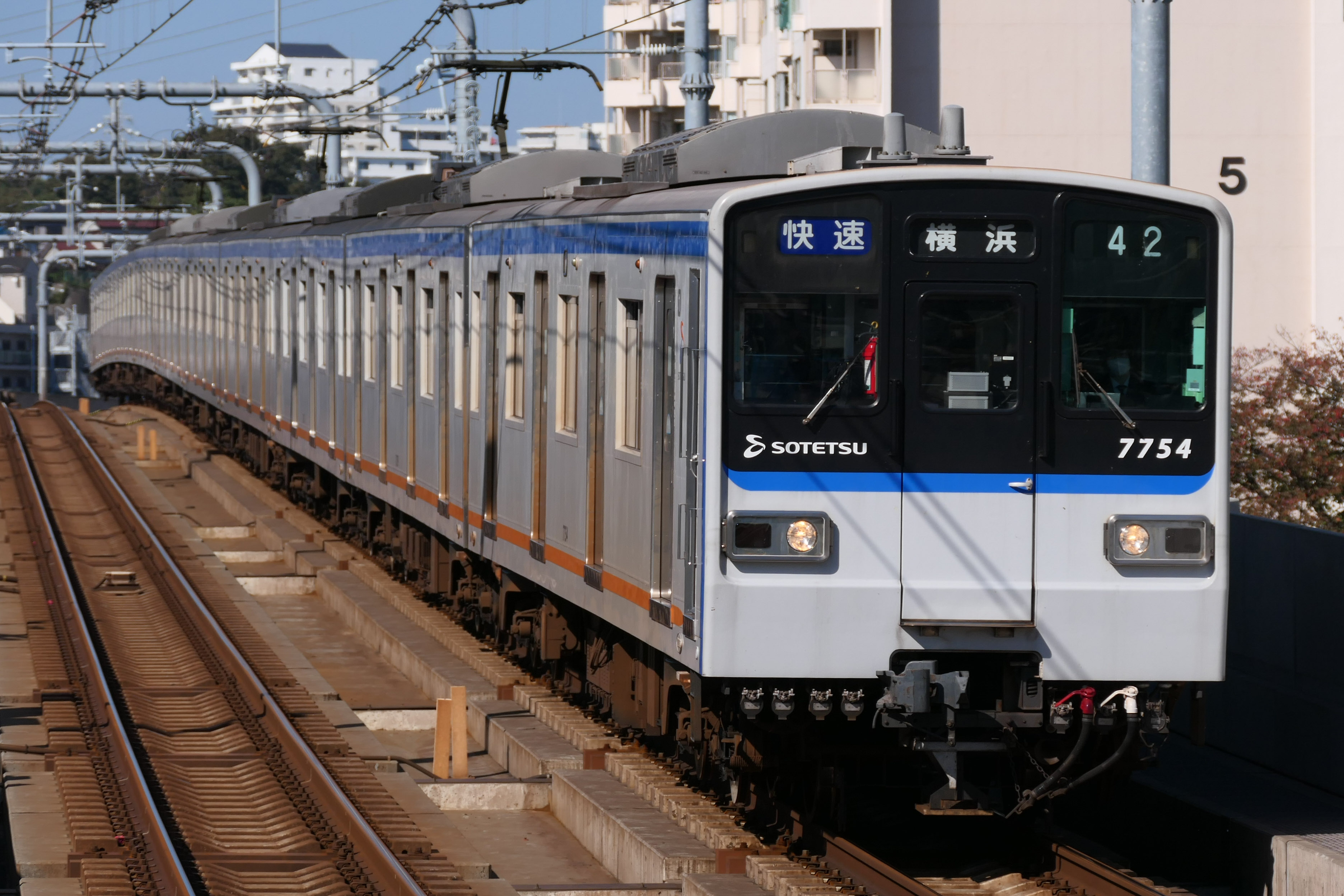
New 7000 series in revised livery

The 7000 series and New 7000 series have been refurbished, since 2008, with the following changes.

- Revised livery (New 7000 series only)
- New electric horn
- Air conditioners changed to new type using environmentally friendly freon
- Single-arm pantographs in place of original lozenge pantographs
- Improved interior fluorescent lighting.

=== Safety systems ===
The company plans to build a new line linking to East Japan Railway Company (JR East), and so Sotetsu began to change the original safety system to the standard JR type.

== Formations ==
=== Key ===
- M: Motored cars
- T: Trailer cars
- c: Cab cars
- CONT: Motor control equipment
- MG: Motor-generator
- CP: Reciproating compressor
- PT: Pantograph

=== 7000 series ===
==== 10-car sets ====
Car No.	1	2	3	4	5	6	7	8	9	10
Designation	Mc1	M2	Tc2	M1	M2	Tc1	Tc2	M1	M2	Tc1
Numbering	MoHa 7000	MoHa 7100	KuHa 7700	MoHa 7100		KuHa 7500 (Note: SaHa 7600 in some sets)	KuHa 7700	MoHa 7100		KuHa 7500
Equipment	Cont, PT	MG,CP,PT		Cont, PT	MG,CP,PT			Cont, PT	-	

==== 8-car sets ====
Car No.	1	2	3	4	5	6	7	8
Designation	Tc2	M1	M2	Tc1	Tc2	M1	M2	Tc1
Numbering	MoHa 7100	MoHa 7100		KuHa 7500	KuHa 7700	MoHa 7100		KuHa 7500
Equipment		Cont, PT	MG,CP,PT			Cont, PT	MG,CP,PT	

=== New 7000 series ===
Car No.	1	2	3	4	5	6	7	8	9	10
Designation	Tc2	M1	M2	M1	M2	Tc1	Tc2	M1	M2	Tc1
Numbering	KuHa 7700	MoHa 7100				KuHa 7500	KuHa 7700	MoHa 7100		KuHa 7500
Equipment		Cont, PT	MG,CP,PT	Cont, PT	MG,CP,PT			Cont, PT	MG,CP,PT	

==== VFD control set ====
Car No.	1	2	3	4	5	6	7	8	9	10
Designation	Tc2	M	T2	M	T1	T2	M	T1	M	Tc1
Numbering	KuHa 7750	MoHa 7350	SaHa 7650	MoHa 7350	SaHa 7650		MoHa 7350	SaHa 7650	MoHa 7350	KuHa 7550
Equipment	MG, CP	Cont, PT		Cont, PT	MG, CP		Cont, PT	MG, CP	Cont, PT	
