= Sotetsu 5000 series =

Japanese train type

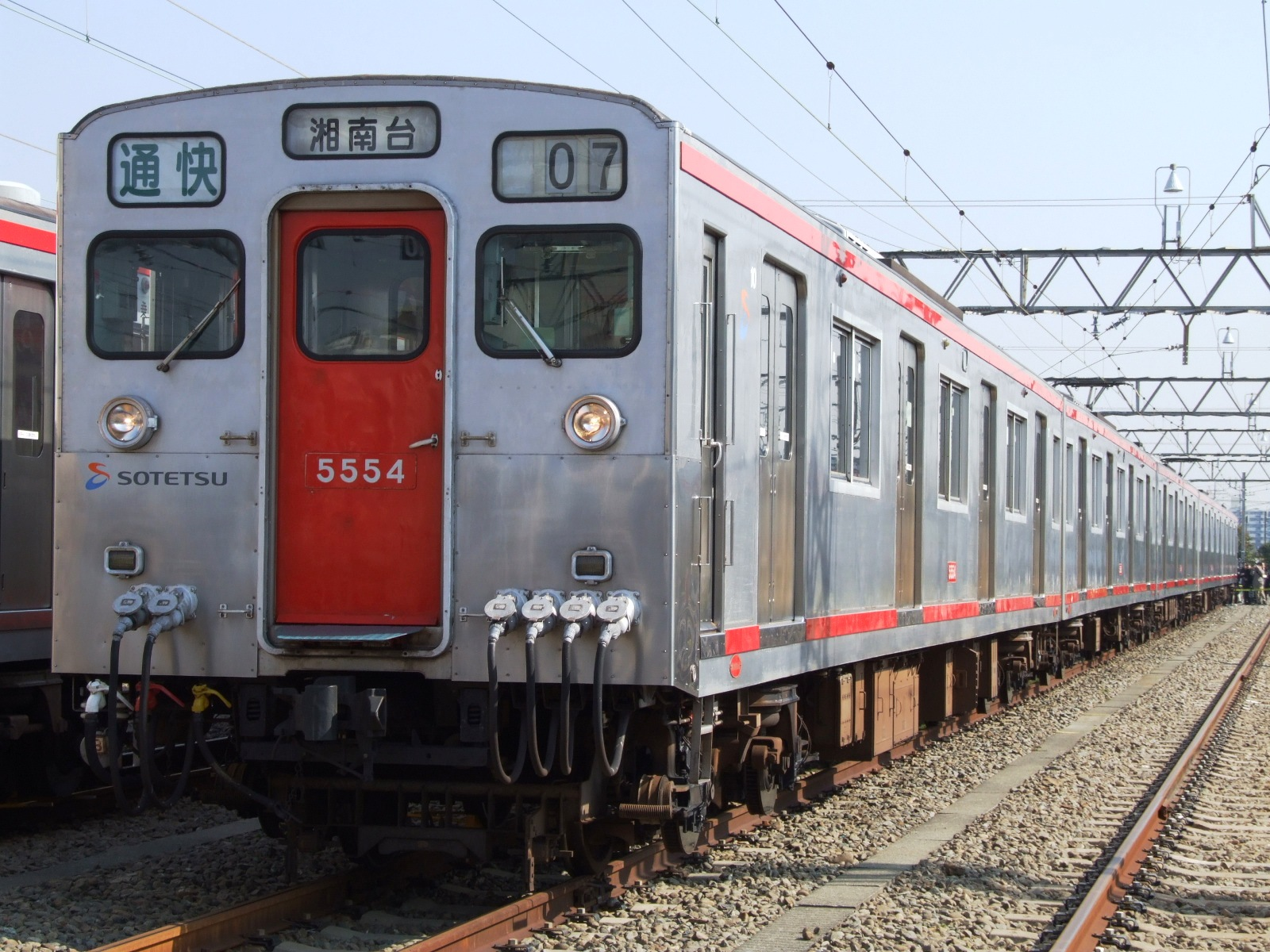
- Sotetsu 5000 series set 5554 at Sagami-Ōtsuka Station in 2009
- In service: 1955–2009
- Operators: Sotetsu

Specifications
- Car body construction: Aluminium
- Doors: 4 pairs per side
- Electric system(s): 1,500 V DC
- Current collector(s): overhead
- Track gauge: 1,067 mm (3 ft 6 in)

The Sotetsu 5000 series (相鉄5000系) was an electric multiple unit (EMU) commuter train type operated by the private railway operator Sagami Railway (Sotetsu) in Japan.

== History ==
First introduced in December 1955, the trains were rebuilt from 1972 with new lightweight aluminium bodies and air-conditioning. The last train in operation was withdrawn on 11 February 2009.
