= Sotetsu 13000 series =

Japanese electric multiple unit train type

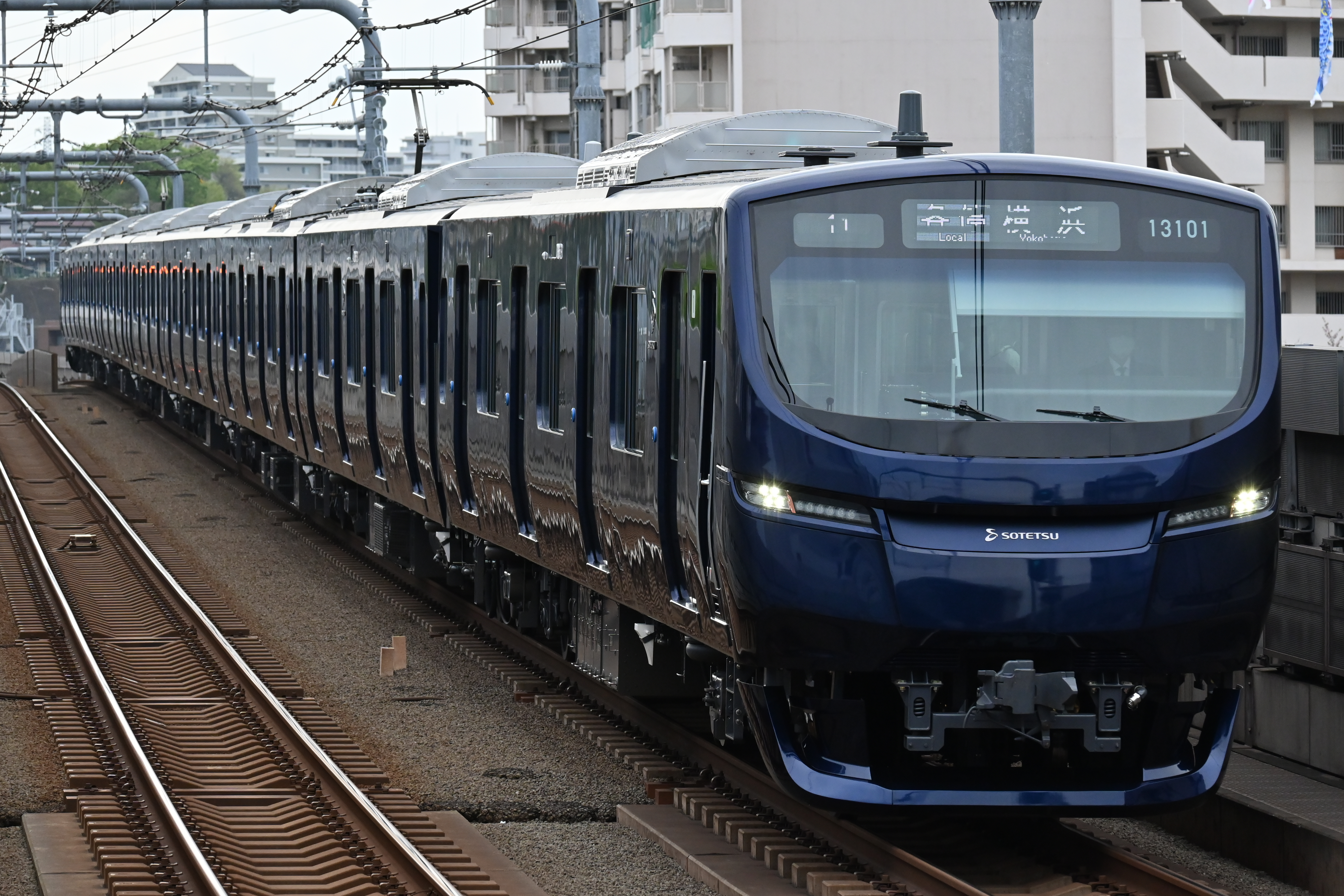
- 13000 series set in April 2026
- In service: 30 March 2026 – present
- Manufacturer: J-TREC
- Built at: Kanazawa-ku, Yokohama
- Replaced: 8000 series; 9000 series
- Constructed: 2025–
- Number under construction: 8 vehicles (1 set)
- Number built: 9 vehicles (1 set + 1 control car)
- Formation: 8 cars per trainset
- Operator: Sagami Railway

Specifications
- Car body construction: Stainless steel
- Car length: 20 m (65 ft 7 in) (intermediate cars); 20.8 m (68 ft 3 in) (end cars)
- Width: 2,950 mm (9 ft 8 in)
- Maximum speed: 120 km/h (75 mph)
- Acceleration: 3.0 km/(h⋅s) (1.9 mph/s)
- Deceleration: 5.0 km/(h⋅s) (3.1 mph/s)
- Track gauge: 1,067 mm (3 ft 6 in)

Notes/references
- Specifications

The Sotetsu 13000 series (Japanese: 相鉄13000系) is an electric multiple unit (EMU) train type operated by the private railway operator Sagami Railway (Sotetsu) on commuter services in Kanagawa Prefecture, Japan, since 2026.

== Design ==
The 13000 series is built on J-TREC's Sustina platform. The trains inherit the underfloor equipment and interior design used with the earlier 12000 series, but the 13000 series' end cars each feature six additional seats.

== Operations ==
The train type will be used across the Sotetsu network. Instead of being formed of 10 cars like the 8000 and 9000 series trainsets the new trains are due to replace, Sotetsu decided that initial 13000 series sets would use an 8-car formation, citing population trends along the railway. However, Sotetsu expressed that it was willing to reconsider its plans if needed.

== History ==
The new train type was first teased by Sotetsu on 7 February 2025. Sotetsu announced additional details for the 13000 series on 25 April 2025.

The first set was delivered from the J-TREC plant in Yokohama in November 2025. The fleet entered revenue service on 30 March 2026. As part of its capital investment year for fiscal 2026, Sotetsu announced that it would procure a second 13000 series 8-car set.

On 28 August 2026, Sotetsu announced that it had delivered a single 13000 series car to "Sotetsu Park", their venue in the upcoming International Horticultural Expo 2027 in Yokohama. Sotetsu designated this car as the 13100 series.

== See also ==
- Tobu 80000 series – train type introduced in 2025 as part of similar rightsizing initiatives for the Tobu Urban Park Line
