= Sotetsu 20000 series =

Japanese electric multiple unit train type

Sotetsu 20000 and 21000 series
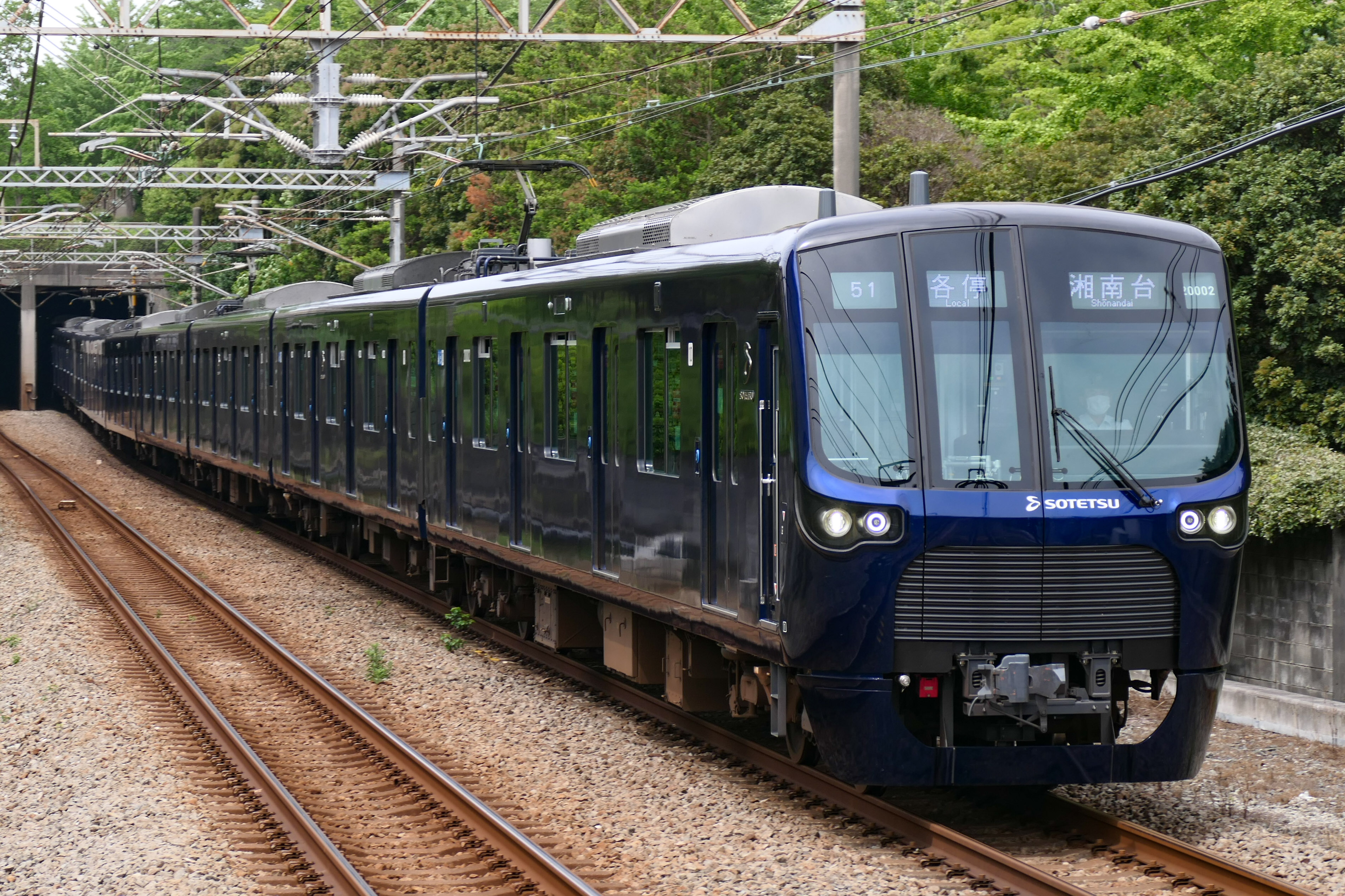
- Set 20102 in May 2021
- In service: February 2018 – present
- Manufacturer: Hitachi Rail
- Built at: Kudamatsu, Yamaguchi
- Family name: A-train
- Replaced: 7000 series
- Constructed: 2017–present
- Entered service: 11 February 2018 (20000 series); 6 September 2021 (21000 series)
- Number under construction: 21000 series: 8 vehicles (1 set)
- Number built: 142 vehicles; 7 × 10-car; 9 × 8-car
- Number in service: 118 vehicles; 7 × 10-car; 6 × 8-car
- Formation: 10 cars per 20000 series trainset; 8 cars per 21000 series trainset
- Fleet numbers: 20101–20107 (10-car sets); 21101– (8-car sets)
- Operator: Sotetsu
- Lines served: Sotetsu Main Line; Sotetsu Izumino Line; Sotetsu Shin-yokohama Line; Tokyu Shin-yokohama Line; Tokyu Meguro Line; Tokyu Toyoko Line; Tokyo Metro Namboku Line; Saitama Rapid Railway Line; Toei Mita Line; Tokyo Metro Fukutoshin Line

Specifications
- Car body construction: Aluminium alloy
- Car length: 20,470 mm (67 ft 2 in) (end cars); 20,000 mm (65 ft 7 in) (intermediate cars)
- Width: 2,787 mm (9 ft 1.7 in)
- Height: 4,065 mm (13 ft 4.0 in)
- Floor height: 1,130 mm (3 ft 8 in)
- Doors: 4 pairs per side
- Maximum speed: 120 km/h (75 mph) (design speed)
- Traction system: SiC-SBD hybrid 2-level Si-IGBT–VVVF (Hitachi), type VFI-HR1421G
- Traction motors: 190 kW (250 hp) HS32536-04RB fully-enclosed 3-phase AC induction motor (Hitachi)
- Electric systems: 1,500 V DC (overhead catenary)
- Current collection: Toyo Denki PT-7103G single-arm pantograph
- Track gauge: 1,067 mm (3 ft 6 in)

The Sotetsu 20000 series (相鉄20000系) is an electric multiple unit (EMU) commuter train type operated by the private railway operator Sagami Railway ("Sotetsu") in Japan in the Tokyo area since February 2018. Ultimately intended to be used on through-running services between Sotetsu and Tokyu Corporation lines commencing in late fiscal 2022, the first train entered revenue service on 11 February 2018, replacing a 7000 series set.

Eight-car sets designated as 21000 series were announced in April 2021, the first of which entered service in September 2021.

== Design ==
The fleet of ten-car 20000 series trainsets is being built by Hitachi at its Kasado Factory in Kudamatsu, Yamaguchi. Externally, the trains carry the "Yokohama Navy Blue" corporate livery introduced for refurbished 9000 series trains.

== Formation ==
=== 20000 series ===
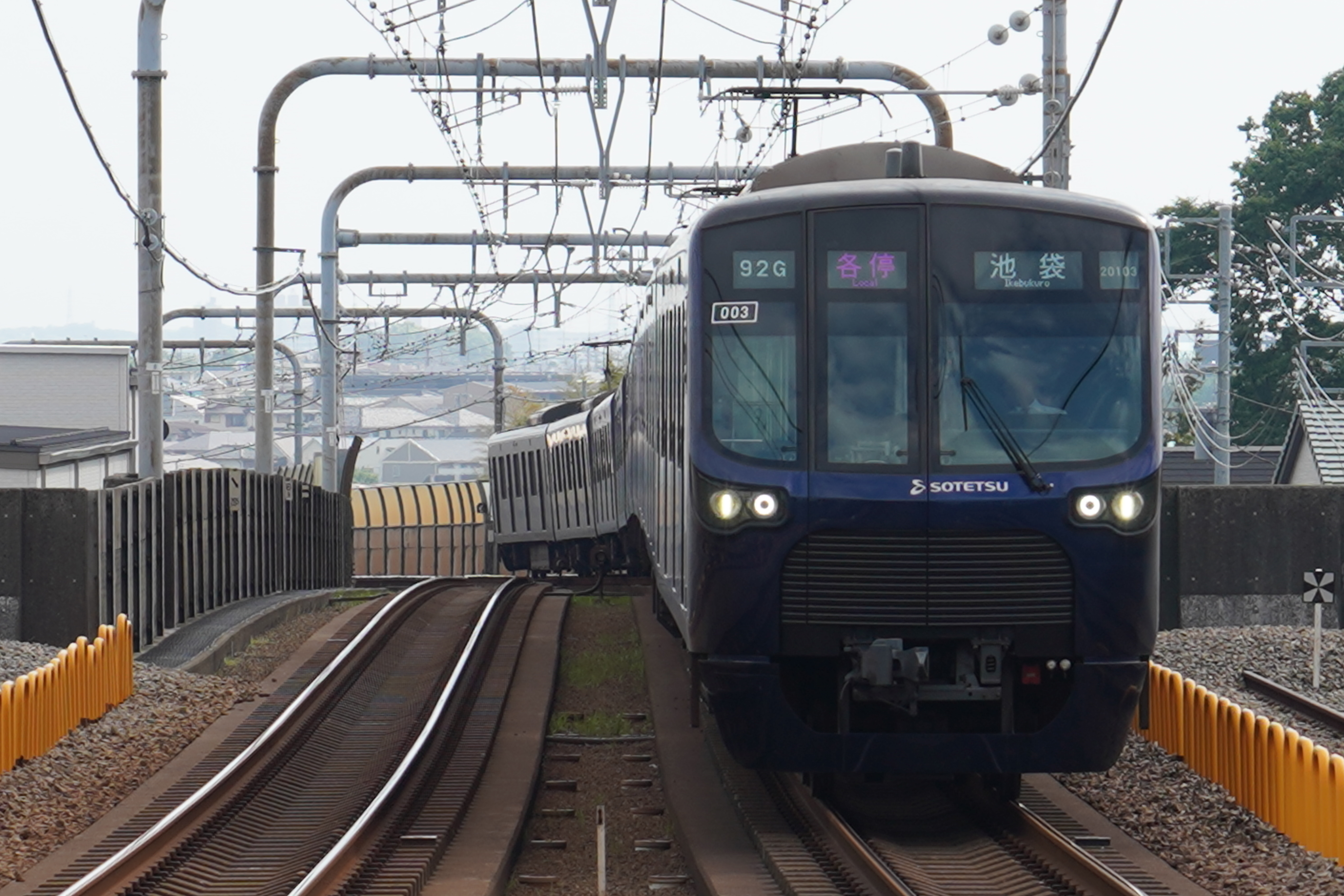
10-car set led by car 20103 bound for Ikebukuro Station, May 2026.

The trains are formed as ten-car sets, as follows, with five motored ("M") cars and five non-powered trailer ("T") cars, and car 1 at the Yokohama end.

Car No.	1	2	3	4	5	6	7	8	9	10
Designation	Tc2	M1	T1	M2	M3	T2	M4	T3	M5	Tc1
Numbering	2010x	2020x	2030x	2040x	2050x	2060x	2070x	2080x	2090x	2000x
Weight (t)	29.9	31.7	29.8	31.1	31.2	26.9	31.7	29.1	31.1	30.0
Capacity (seated/total)	45/133	51/144	51/143	51/143	51/143	51/143	51/143	51/143	51/143	45/133

=== 21000 series ===
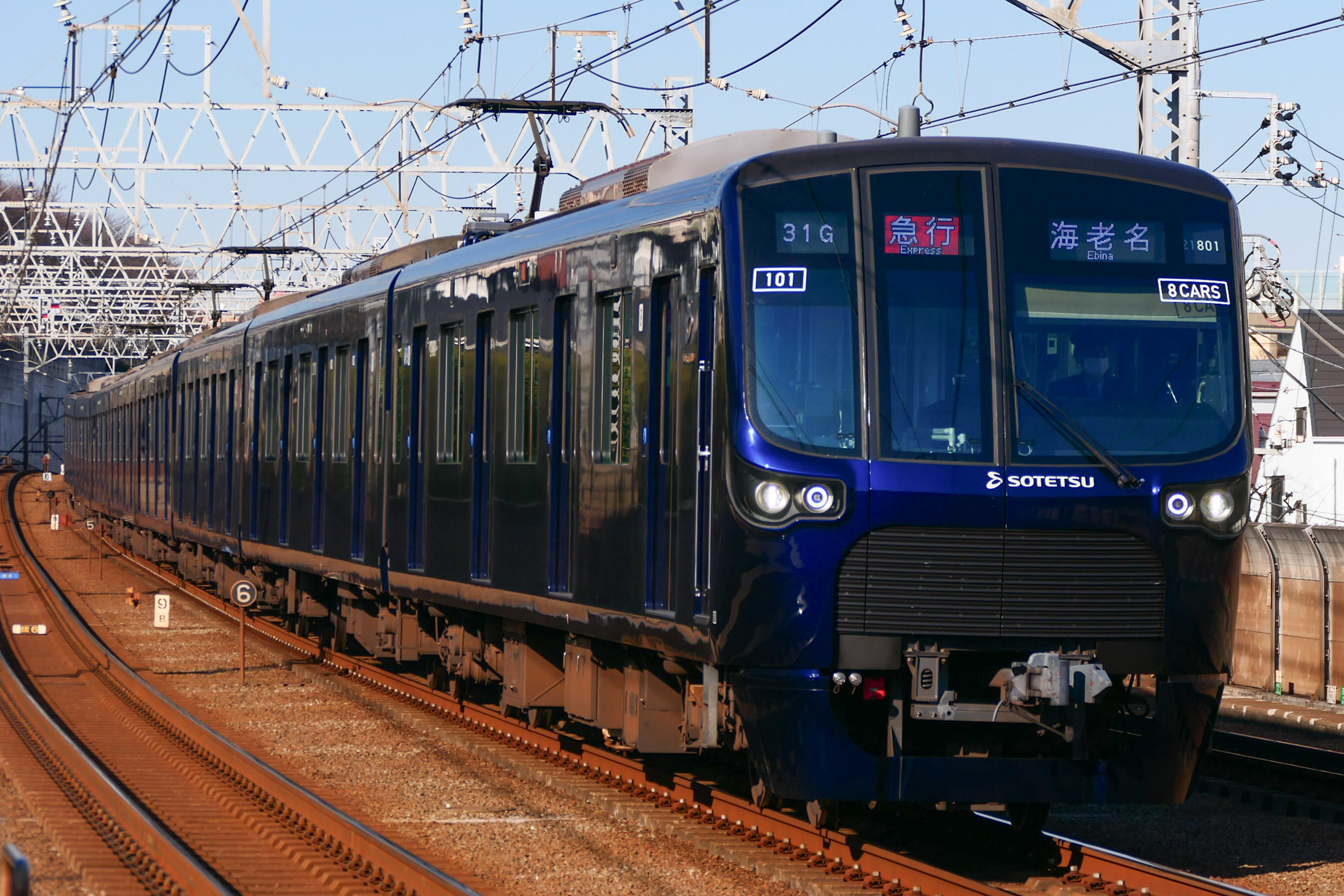
Eight-car set led by car 21801 entering Tamagawa Station, January 2025.

The trains are formed as eight-car sets with four motored ("M") cars and four non-powered trailer ("T") cars, and car 1 at the Yokohama end, as follows.

Car No.	1	2	3	4	5	6	7	8
Designation	Tc2	M1	T1	M2	M3	T2	M4	Tc1
Numbering	2110x	2120x	2130x	2140x	2150x	2160x	2170x	2180x
Weight (t)	29.9	31.7	29.8	31.1	31.7	29.1	31.1	30.0
Capacity (seated/total)	45/133	51/144	51/143	51/143	51/143	51/143	51/143	45/133

== Interior ==
Passenger accommodation consists of longitudinal bench seating with grey moquette seat covers. Each car includes a space for wheelchairs and pushchairs.

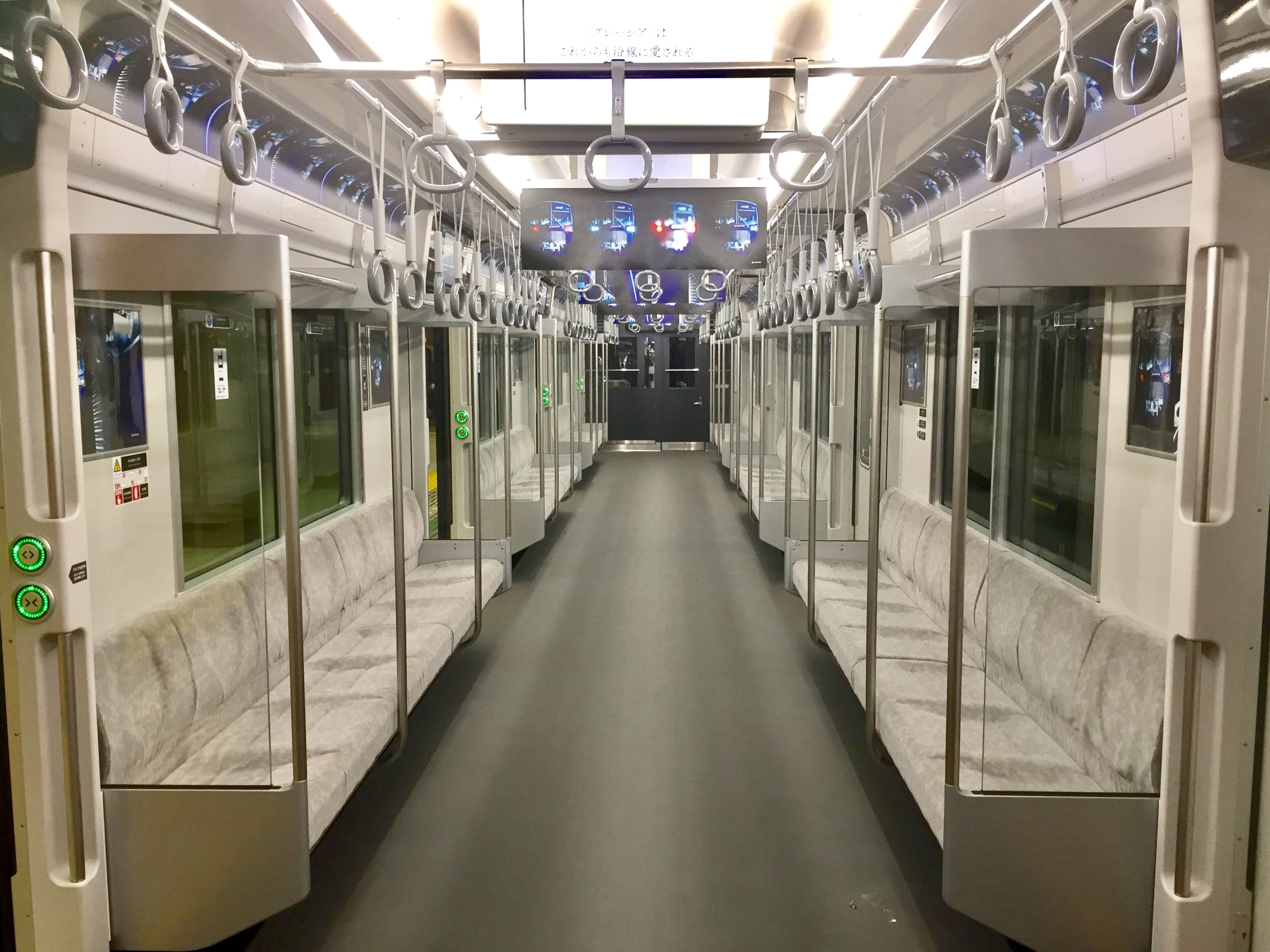
A car interior in February 2018

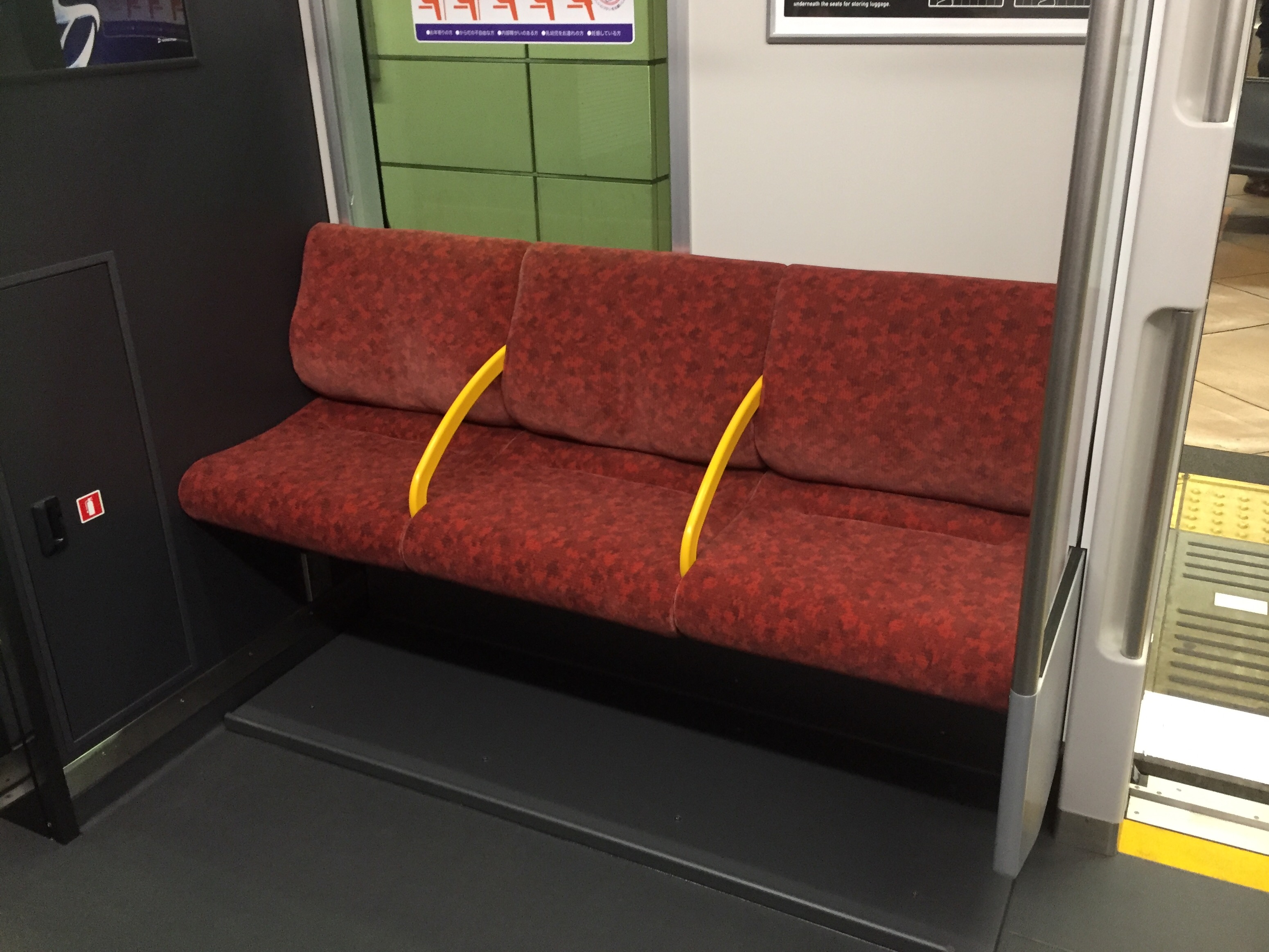
Universal design priority seating

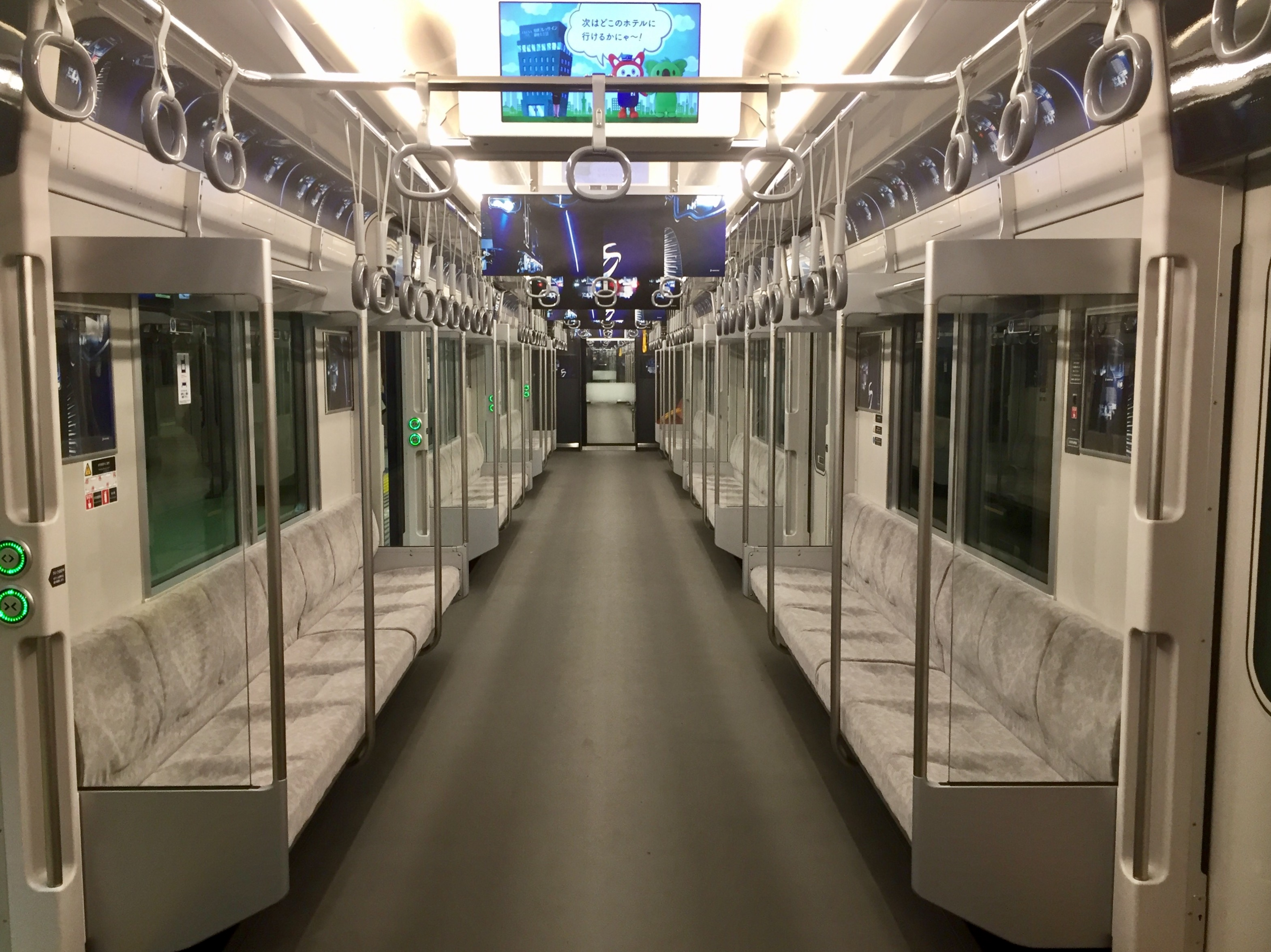
The interior with lighting adjusted to a warmer hue (3000 K) in late evening

The colour temperature of the interior LED lighting is adjusted automatically according to time of day and season as follows (hues shown are illustrative only).

Season	Time of day		Colour temperature [K]	Intensity [%]
Spring (1 April - 30 June)	Early morning	02:01:00 - 06:59:59	4400	90
Spring (1 April - 30 June)	Morning peak	07:00:00 - 09:59:59	5000	90
Spring (1 April - 30 June)	Daytime	10:00:00 - 15:59:59	4400	90
Spring (1 April - 30 June)	Evening	16:00:00 - 17:59:59	4400	90
Spring (1 April - 30 June)	Night	18:00:00 - 02:00:59	3000	100
Summer (1 July - 30 September)	Early morning	02:01:00 - 06:59:59	5000	90
Summer (1 July - 30 September)	Morning peak	07:00:00 - 09:59:59	5000	90
Summer (1 July - 30 September)	Daytime	10:00:00 - 15:59:59	5000	90
Summer (1 July - 30 September)	Evening	16:00:00 - 17:59:59	4400	90
Summer (1 July - 30 September)	Night	18:00:00 - 02:00:59	3000	100
Autumn (1 October - 31 December)	Early morning	02:01:00 - 06:59:59	4400	90
Autumn (1 October - 31 December)	Morning peak	07:00:00 - 09:59:59	4400	90
Autumn (1 October - 31 December)	Daytime	10:00:00 - 15:59:59	4400	90
Autumn (1 October - 31 December)	Evening	16:00:00 - 17:59:59	3800	100
Autumn (1 October - 31 December)	Night	18:00:00 - 02:00:59	3000	100
Winter (1 January - 31 March)	Early morning	02:01:00 - 06:59:59	3300	100
Winter (1 January - 31 March)	Morning peak	07:00:00 - 09:59:59	3800	100
Winter (1 January - 31 March)	Daytime	10:00:00 - 15:59:59	4400	90
Winter (1 January - 31 March)	Evening	16:00:00 - 17:59:59	4400	90
Winter (1 January - 31 March)	Night	18:00:00 - 02:00:59	3000	100

== History ==
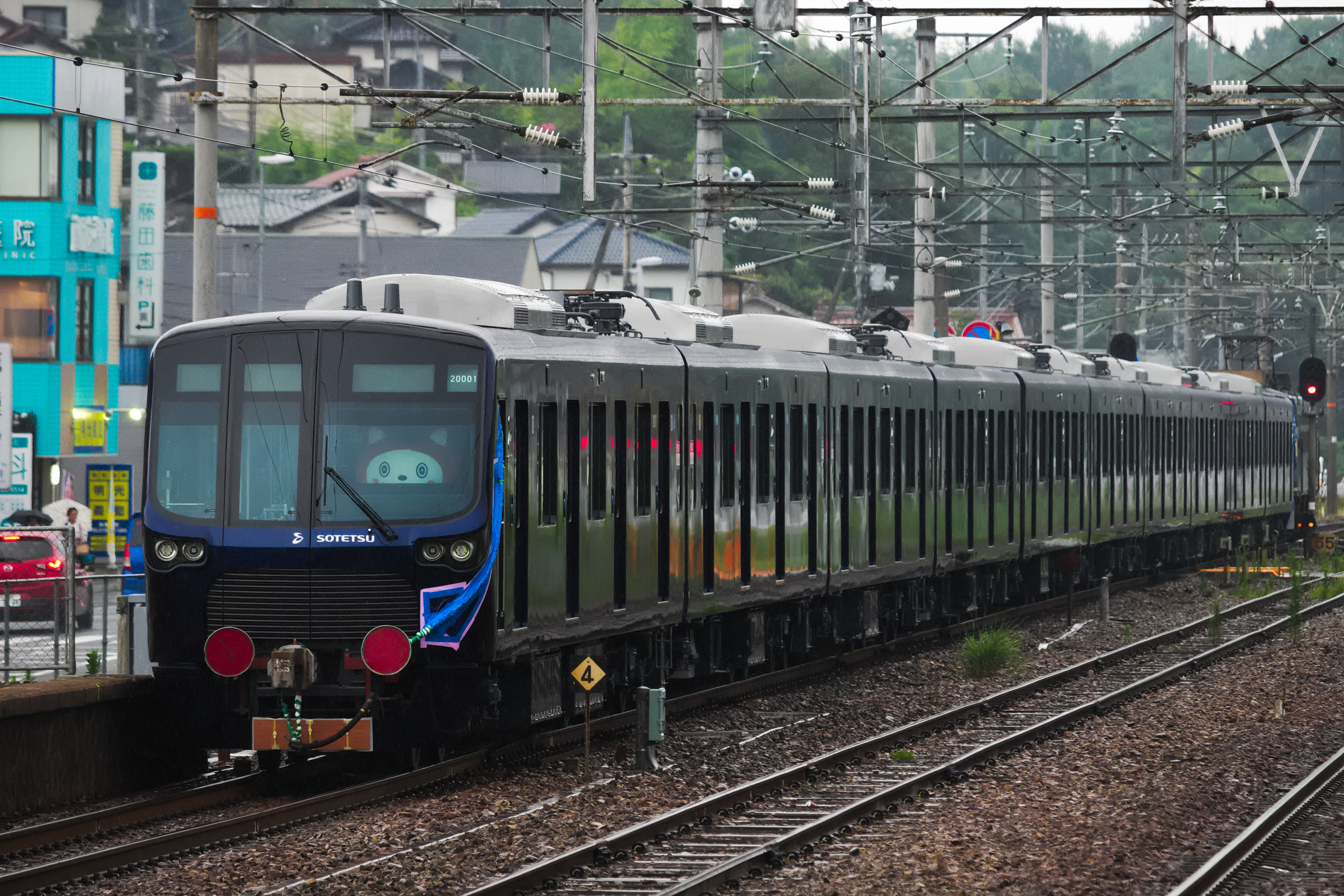
The first set on delivery in July 2017

Details of the new trains were officially announced in June 2017. The first train set was delivered from the Hitachi factory in Kudamatsu, Yamaguchi, in late July 2017.

Originally scheduled to enter revenue service in December 2017, scheduled service entry was subsequently postponed until 11 February 2018.

=== 21000 series ===
An order for a shorter version of the 20000 series was announced on 28 April 2021. These eight-car sets will be designated as 21000 series, and are to be operated through to lines of Tokyu Corporation. The first 21000 series set entered service on 6 September 2021.

As of April 2023, nine 21000 series sets have been built.
