= 13000 series =

13000 series may refer to the Japanese trains:

- Keihan 13000 series
- Sotetsu 13000 series
- Tokyo Metro 13000 series
