= Sotetsu 8000 series =

Japanese train type

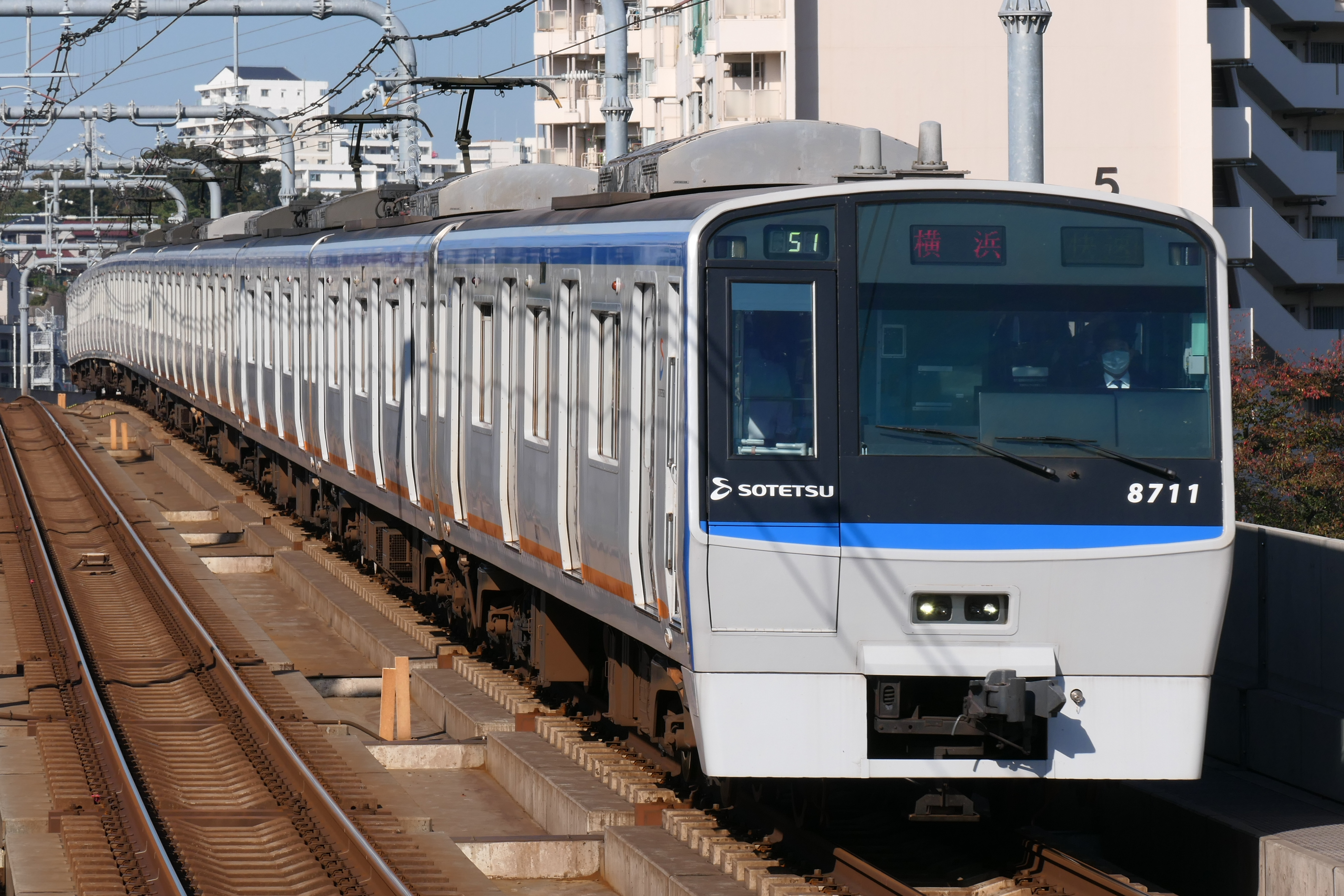
- Set 8711 in revised livery in October 2020
- In service: 1990–Present
- Manufacturer: Hitachi
- Entered service: 21 March 1990
- Refurbished: 2020–
- Scrapped: 2020–
- Number built: 130 vehicles (13 sets)
- Number in service: 70 vehicles (7 sets)
- Number scrapped: 60 vehicles (6 sets)
- Formation: 10 cars per set
- Fleet numbers: 8701–8713
- Operator: Sotetsu
- Depot: Kashiwadai Depot

Specifications
- Car body construction: Aluminium
- Car length: 20,000 mm (65 ft 7 in)
- Width: 2,930 mm (9 ft 7 in)
- Doors: 4 pairs per side
- Maximum speed: 110 km/h (68 mph)
- Traction system: Sets 8701-8707: GTO-VVVF (Hitachi); Sets 8708-8713: IGBT-VVVF (Hitachi)
- Transmission: 49:10
- Acceleration: 3.0 km/(h⋅s) (1.9 mph/s)
- Electric system: 1,500 V DC
- Bogies: Hitachi KH series
- Braking system: Brake by wire
- Safety systems: ATS-P; Dead man's switch
- Track gauge: 1,067 mm

The Sotetsu 8000 series (相鉄8000系) is a DC electric multiple unit (EMU) train type operated by the private railway operator Sagami Railway (Sotetsu) in Kanagawa Prefecture, Japan, since 1990.

== Body ==
The trains use a lightweight aluminium body.

== Interior design ==
Some cars have transverse seating.

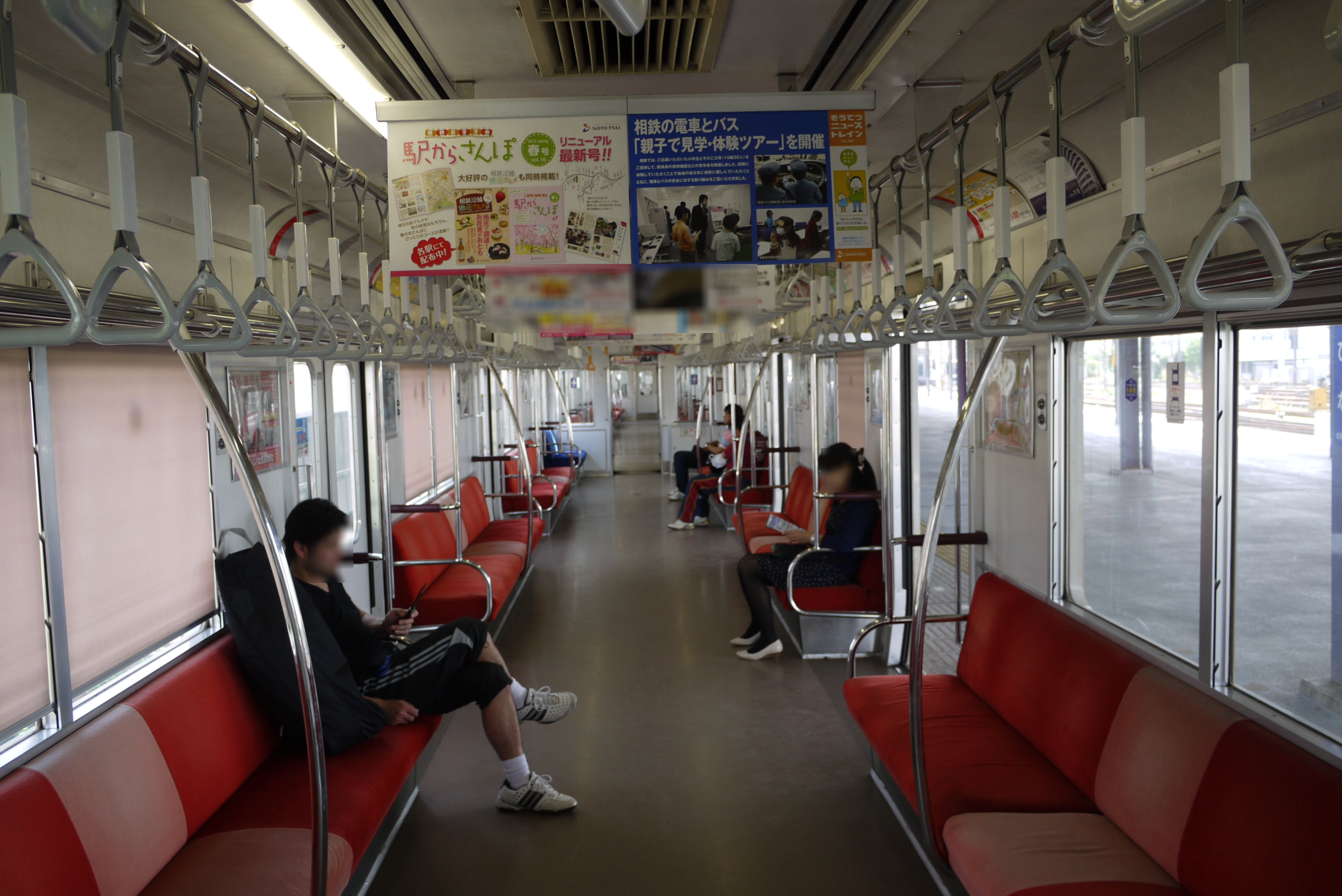
Longitudinal seating in car 8701 in April 2012

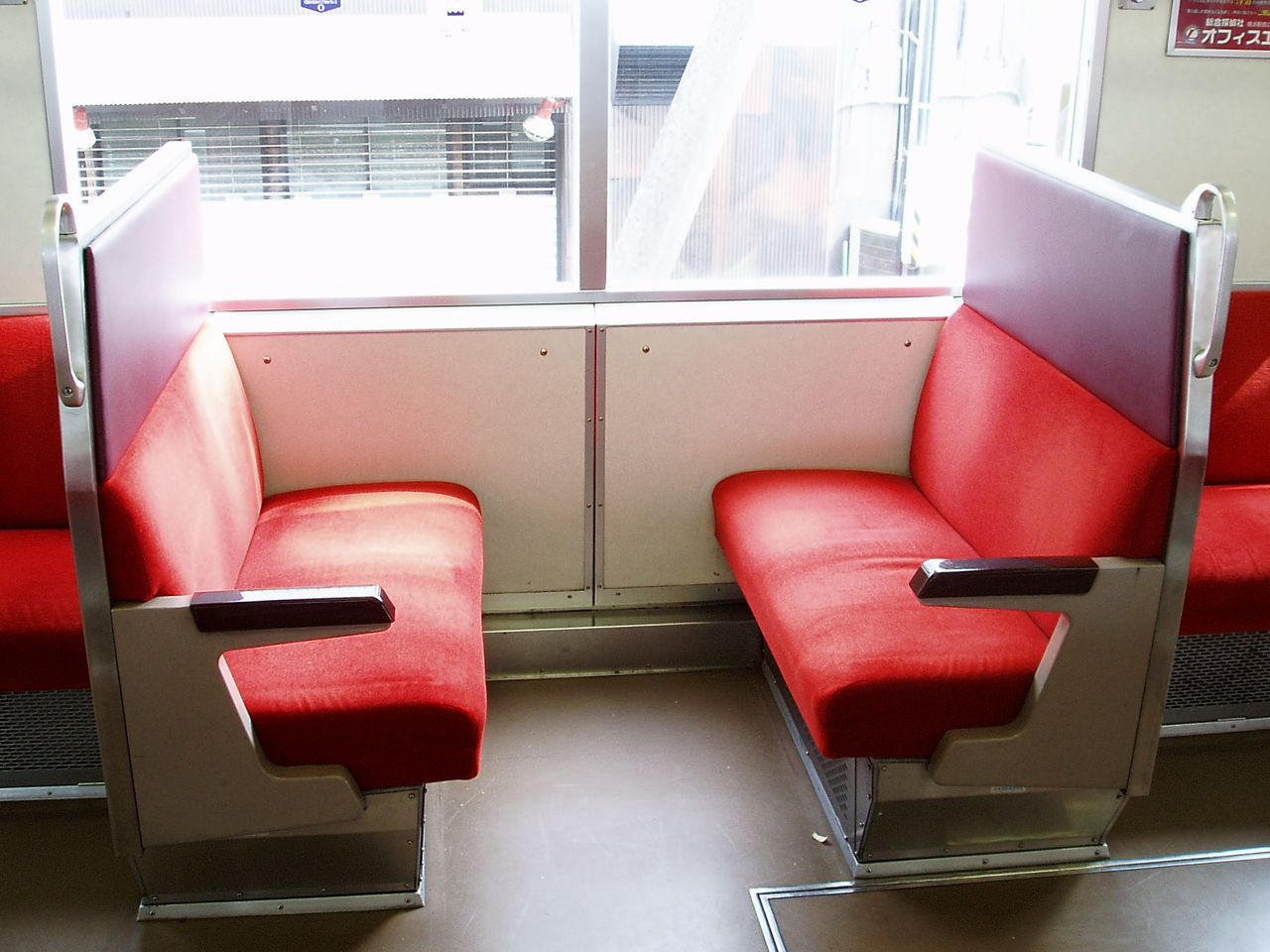
A transverse seating bay

== Electrical equipment ==
The motor system is based on the New 7000 series.

This series adopted variable-frequency drive motors named "Hitachi HSV-03"; the motor power is 150 kW and installed as 4 motors per car. Power cars are two cars as one pair. The 8100 car establishes the VFD-controller, and the 8200 car establishes a compressor, etc.

The brake system was finished with Hitachi HSC and adopted brake by wire with regenerative brake.

Bogies are based on the New 7000 series, too. The name is "KH132B" (for power cars) and "KH135B" (for others).

== Safety system ==
The safety system uses a dead man's switch and automatic train stop.

== Formation ==
As of 1 April 2015, the fleet consists of 12 ten-car sets, formed as follows.

=== 8701–8707 ===
	←Yokohama StationEbina Station/Shonandai Station→									
Car No.	1	2	3	4	5	6	7	8	9	10
Numbering	8700 (Tc2)	8100 (M1)	8200 (M2)	8600 (T2)	8100 (Ms1) ★	8200 (M2)	8600 (T1)	8100 (Ms1) ★	8200 (M2)	8500 (Tc1)
Equipment		CONT, PT	MG, CP, PT		CONT, PT	MG, CP, PT		CONT, PT	MG, CP, PT	

=== 8708–8713 ===
	←YokohamaEbina/Shonandai→									
Car No.	1	2	3	4	5	6	7	8	9	10
Numbering	8700 (Tc2)	8100 (M1)	8200 (M2)	8600 (T2)	8100 (Ms1) ★	8200 (M2)	8600 (T1)	8100 (Ms1) ★	8200 (M2)	8500 (Tc1)
Equipment		CONT, PT	CP, PT	SIV	CONT, PT	CP, PT	SIV	CONT, PT	CP, PT	

Key:

- CONT：VFD controller (1 Controller operates 2 cars, 8 Motors. 1C8M)
- MG：Motor-generator
- SIV：Inverter (electrical)
- CP：Reciprocating compressor
- PT：pantograph
- ★ Transverse seating

== History ==
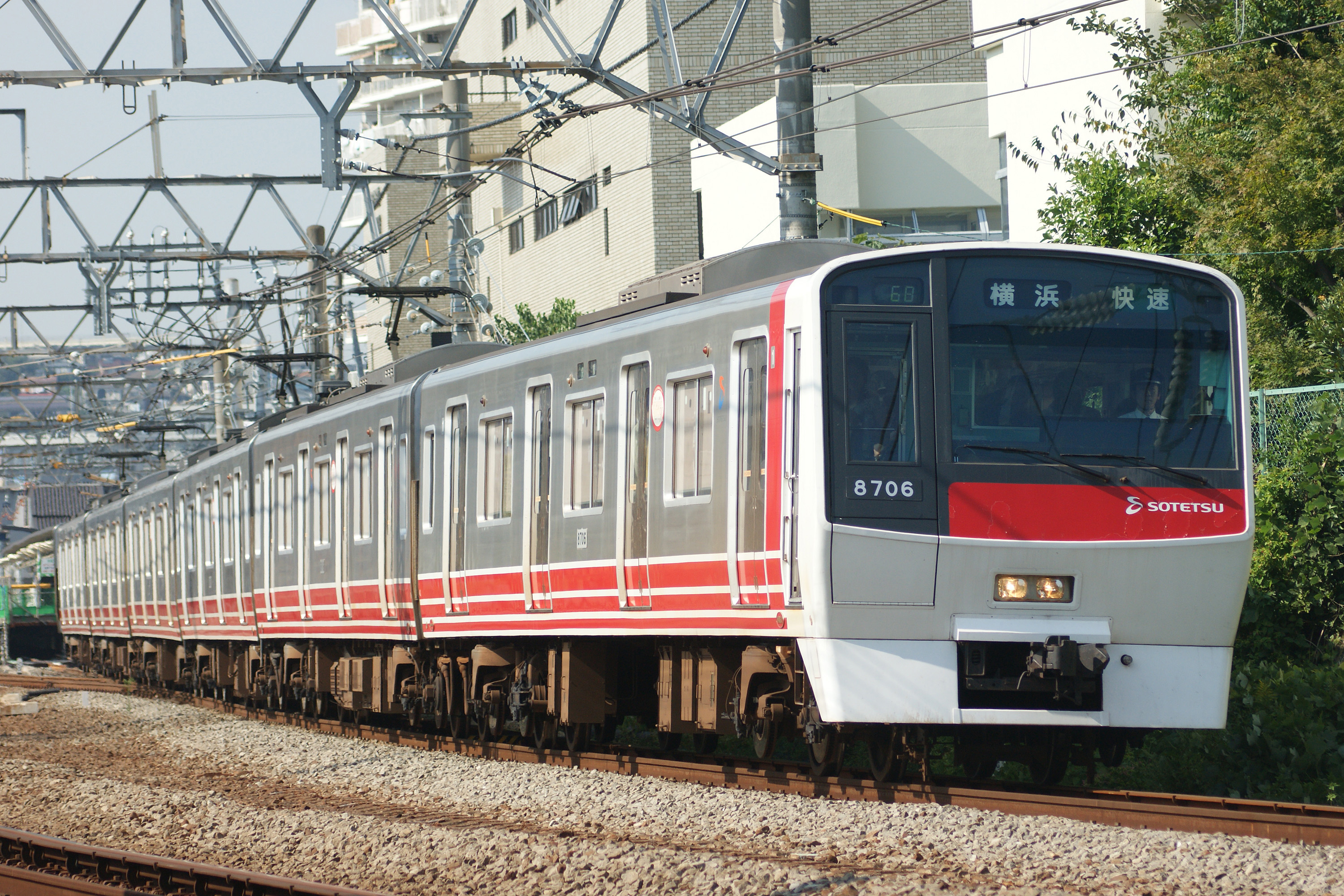
Set 8706 in original livery in October 2008

A total of 130 cars were built between 1990 and 2000 by Hitachi in Yamaguchi Prefecture. They replaced many of the aging 6000 series and new 6000 series sets.

Set 8707 was involved in a collision with a track maintenance vehicle in March 2004, at Shonandai Station, and was scrapped in 2006. The set was replaced by a newer Sotetsu 10000 series set. Set 8702 was withdrawn from service on 13 March 2020 for aging reasons and due to the introduction of newly built set 12106 and was scrapped in April of the same year.

== Refurbishment ==
=== Body ===
- The air conditioners were changed to new freon-based type.
- Some diamond-shaped pantographs were changed to single-arm.
- From 2008, the livery was changed to a new livery based on that used on the Sotetsu 10000 series.
- One Set 8709 Was painted into The Yokohama Navy Blue further sets will be refurbished with new interiors and full led indicator destination

=== Interior design ===
- Some early formations do not have wheelchair space, so it was added in the 8700 and 8500 cars.
- The bench seats were replaced with sculpted longitudinal seats and the seat covers were changed from orange to purple.
- Both ends of the seat were attached to white partition board and a curved pole.

=== Safety system ===
- ATS was changed from original type to the same type as the East Japan Railway Company.
- A new safety system was established. If no control in one minute, then the emergency brake engages and the train stops. This system is named by Japan "EB".
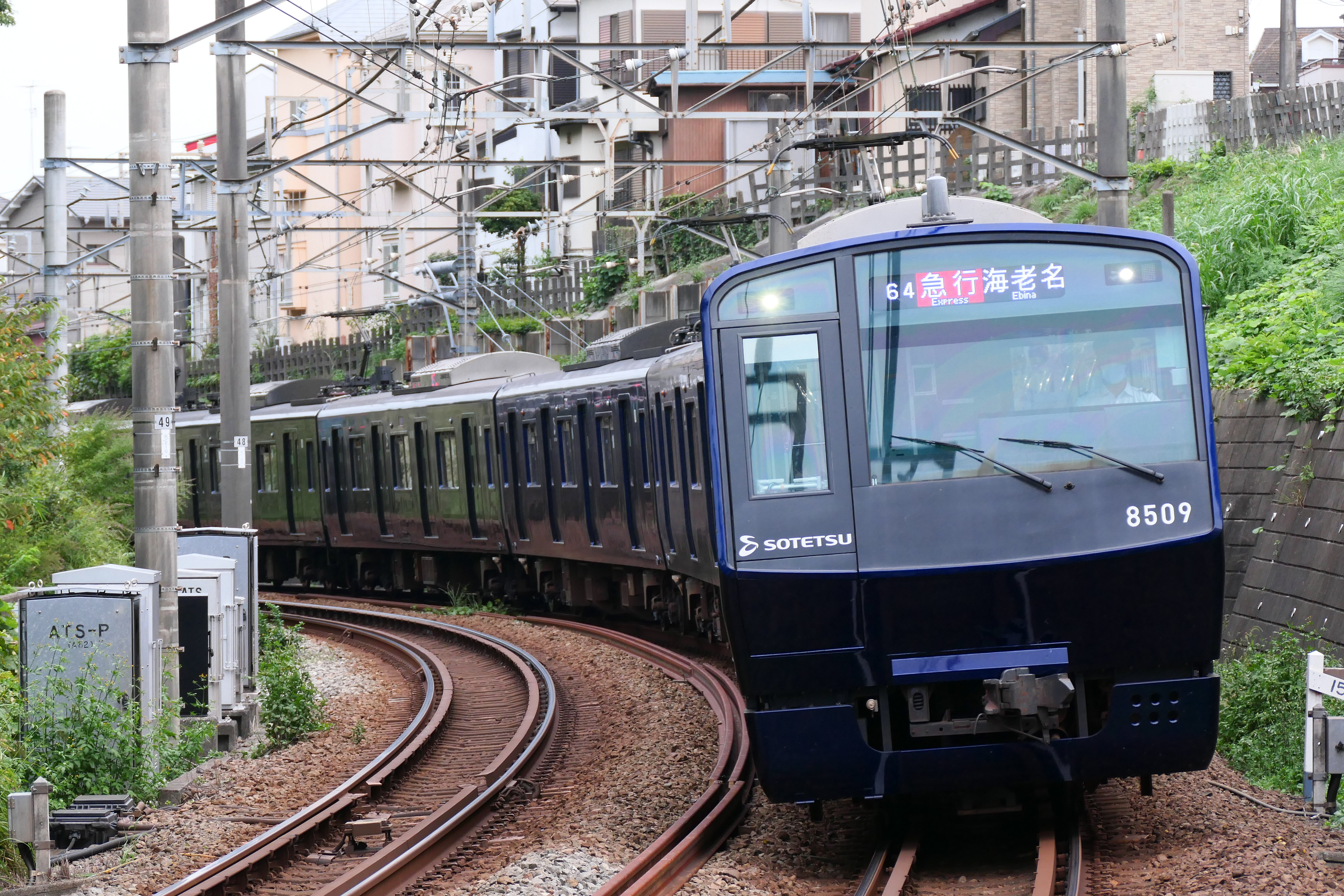
Refurbished set 8509 in "Yokohama Navy Blue" in September 2020

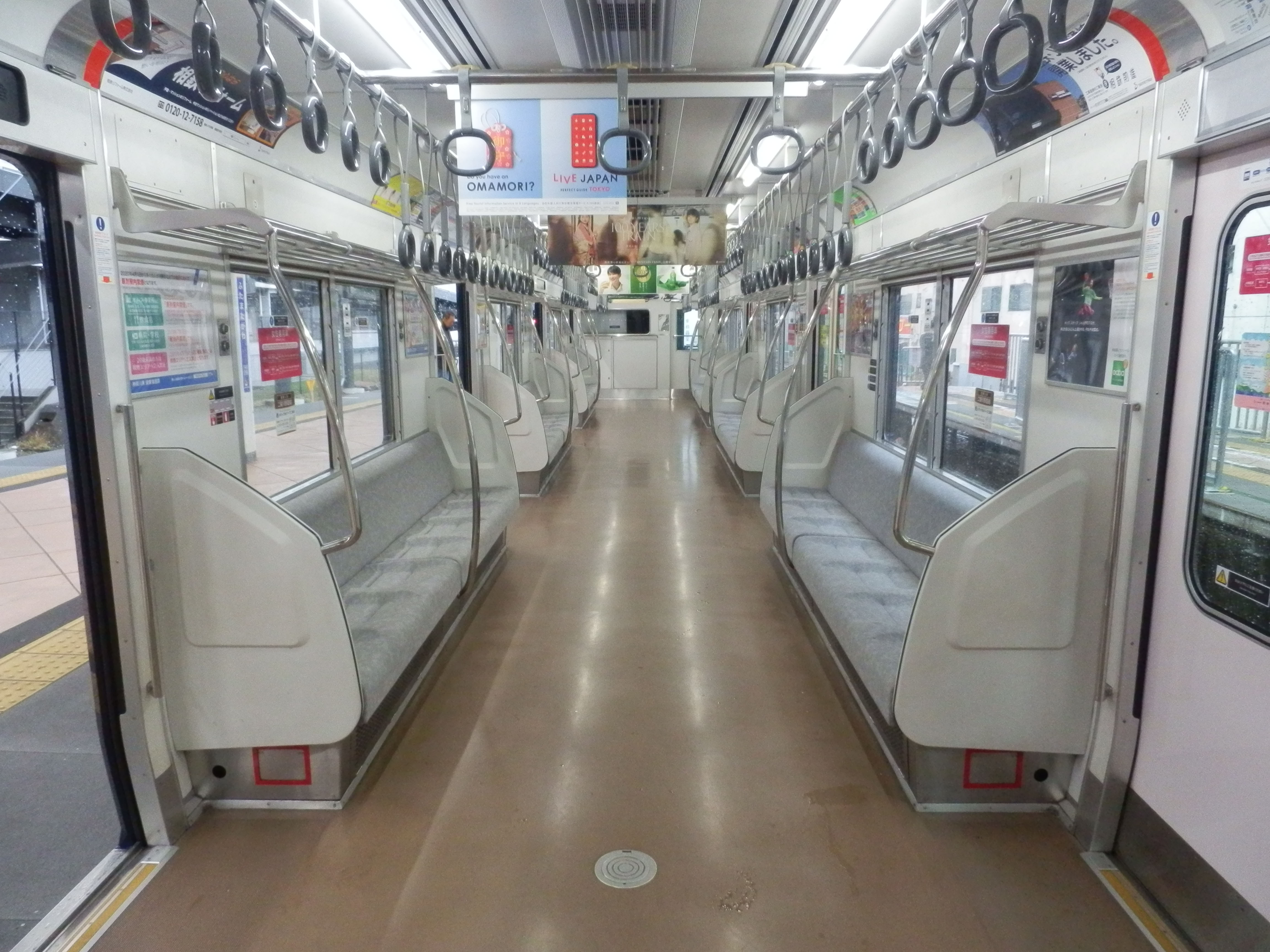
Interior of refurbished 8000 series longitudinal seating in March 2020

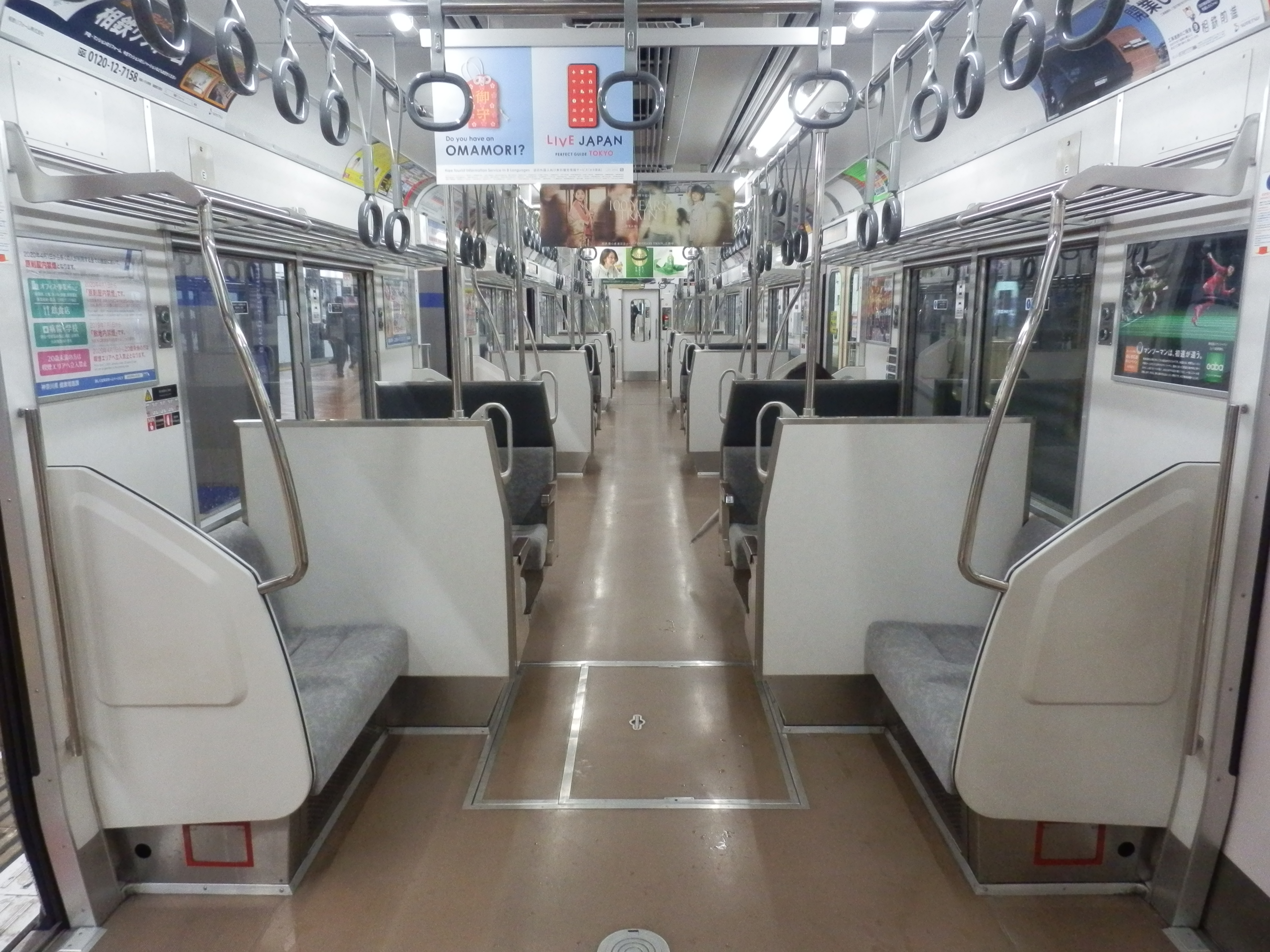
Interior of refurbished 8000 series transverse seating in March 2020

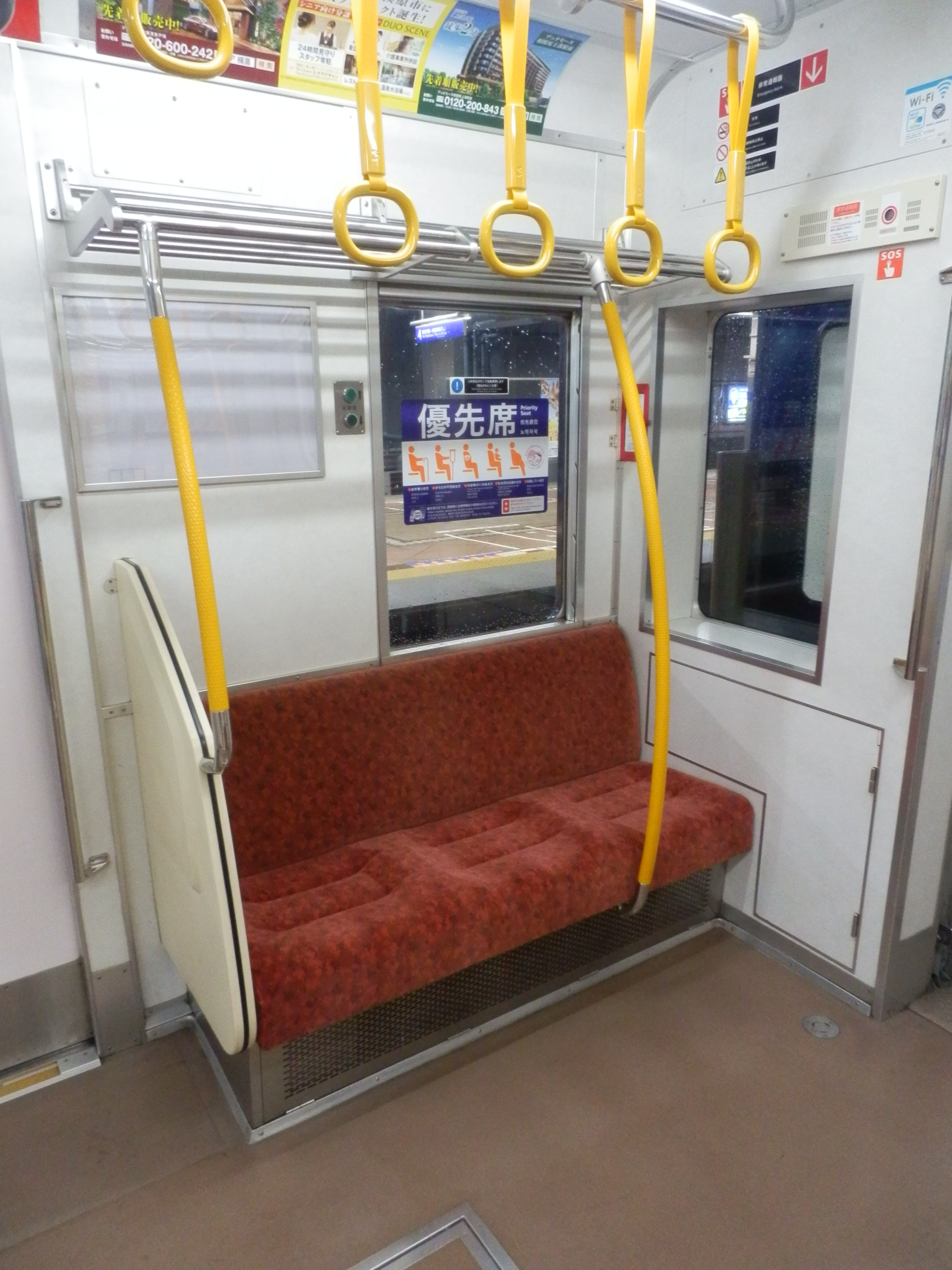
Priority seating in March 2020
