= Sotetsu 9000 series =

Japanese train type

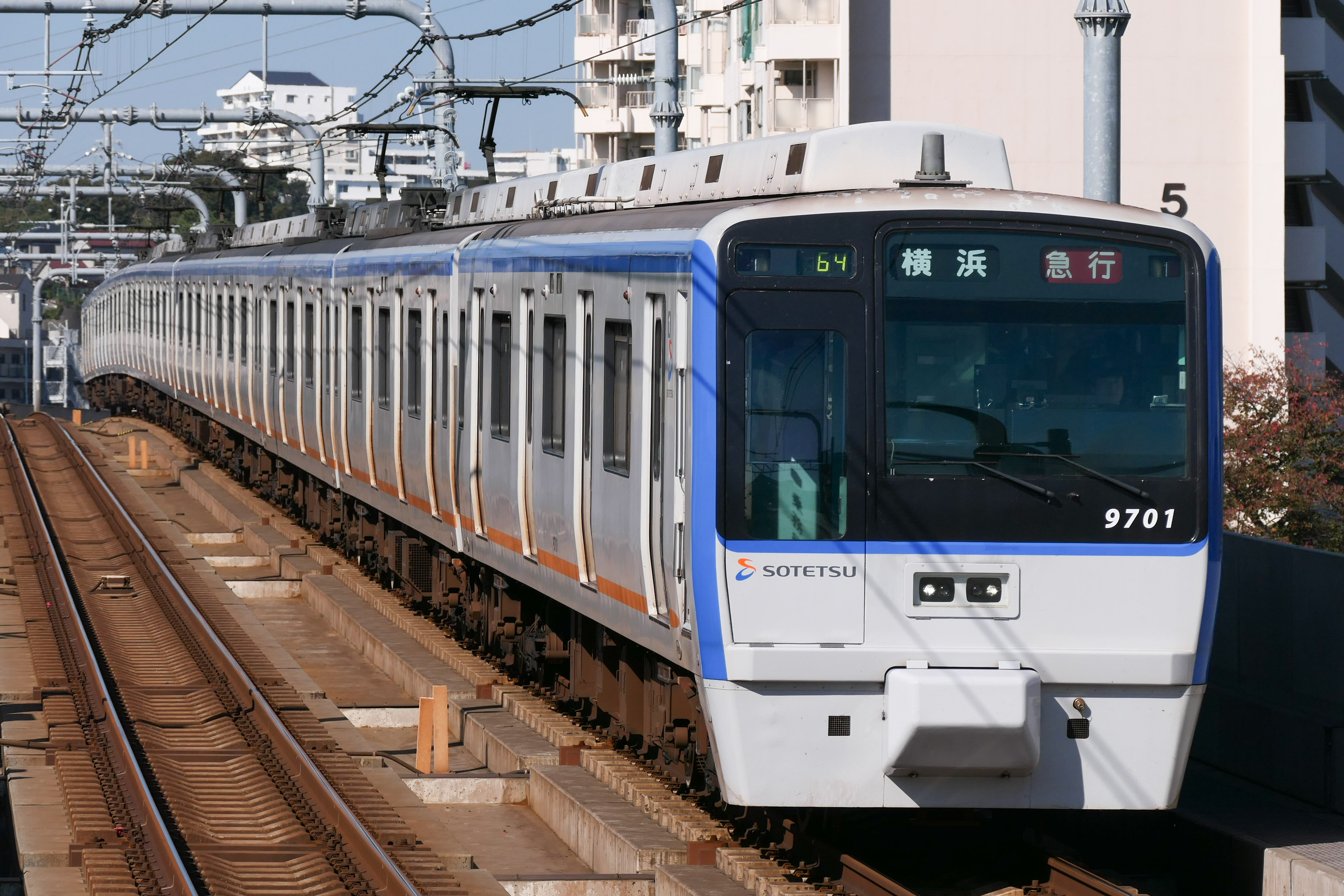
- 9000 series set 9701 in October 2020
- In service: 1993–Present
- Manufacturer: Tokyu Car Corporation
- Constructed: 1993–2001
- Entered service: 14 March 1993
- Refurbished: 2016–2019
- Scrapped: 2020
- Number built: 70 vehicles (7 sets)
- Number in service: 60 vehicles (6 sets)
- Number scrapped: 10 vehicles (1 set)
- Formation: 10 cars per set
- Fleet numbers: 9701–9707
- Operator: Sotetsu
- Depot: Kashiwadai Station

Specifications
- Car body construction: Aluminium
- Car length: 20,100 mm (65 ft 11 in) (end cars); 20,000 mm (65 ft 7 in) (intermediate cars)
- Width: 2,970 mm (9 ft 9 in)
- Doors: 4 pairs per side
- Maximum speed: 100 km/h (60 mph)
- Traction system: Original: GTO-VVVF (Toyo Denki); Refurbished: IGBT-VVVF (Hitachi)
- Acceleration: 3.0 km/(h⋅s) (1.9 mph/s)
- Electric system: 1,500 V DC
- Bogies: TS-907 (motored), TS-908 (trailer)
- Braking system: Brake by wire
- Safety systems: ATS-P; Dead man's switch
- Track gauge: 1,067 mm (3 ft 6 in)

The Sotetsu 9000 series (相鉄9000系) is a DC electric multiple unit (EMU) type operated by the private railway operator Sagami Railway (Sotetsu) on commuter services in Kanagawa Prefecture, Japan, since 1993.

== Formations ==
As of 1 April 2015, the fleet consists of seven ten-car sets, numbered 9701 to 9707, formed as shown below with six motored ("M") cars and four non-powered trailer ("T") cars, and car 1 at the Yokohama end.

=== Unrefurbished sets ===
The unrefurbished sets are formed as follows.

Car No.	1	2	3	4	5	6	7	8	9	10
Designation	Tc2	M1	M2	T2	MS1	M2	T1	MS1	M2	Tc1
Numbering	9700	9100	9200	9600	9100	9200	9600	9100	9200	9500
Capacity (total/seated)	142/45	153/54	153/54	153/54	154/60	153/54	153/54	154/60	153/54	142/45
Weight (t)	28.6	37.6	38.0	26.2	37.8	38.0	26.6	37.8	38.0	28.5

The motored cars each have one pantograph.

=== Refurbished sets ===
The refurbished sets are formed as follows.

Car No.	1	2	3	4	5	6	7	8	9	10
Designation	Tc2	M1	M2	T2	MS1	M2	T1	MS1	M2	Tc1
Numbering	9700	9100	9200	9600	9100	9200	9600	9100	9200	9500
Capacity (total/seated)	140/45	151/54	151/54	151/54	150/60	151/54	151/54	150/60	151/54	140/45
Weight (t)	28.8	38.1	38.3	26.7	38.3	38.3	27.1	38.3	38.3	28.9

The motored cars each have one pantograph.

== Interior ==
Passenger accommodation consists mostly of longitudinal bench seating, but cars 5 and 8 include transverse seating bays.

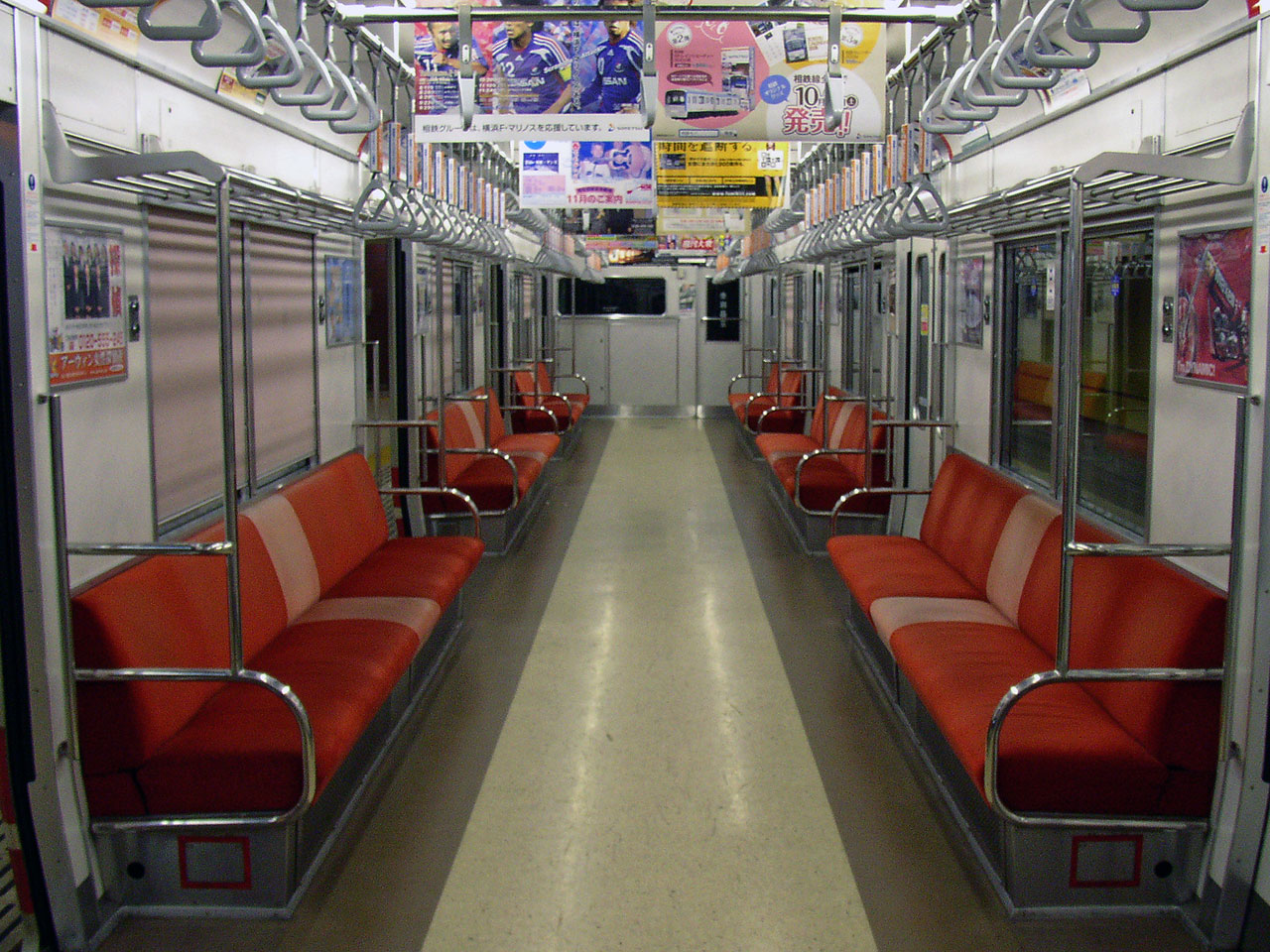
Interior with longitudinal seating

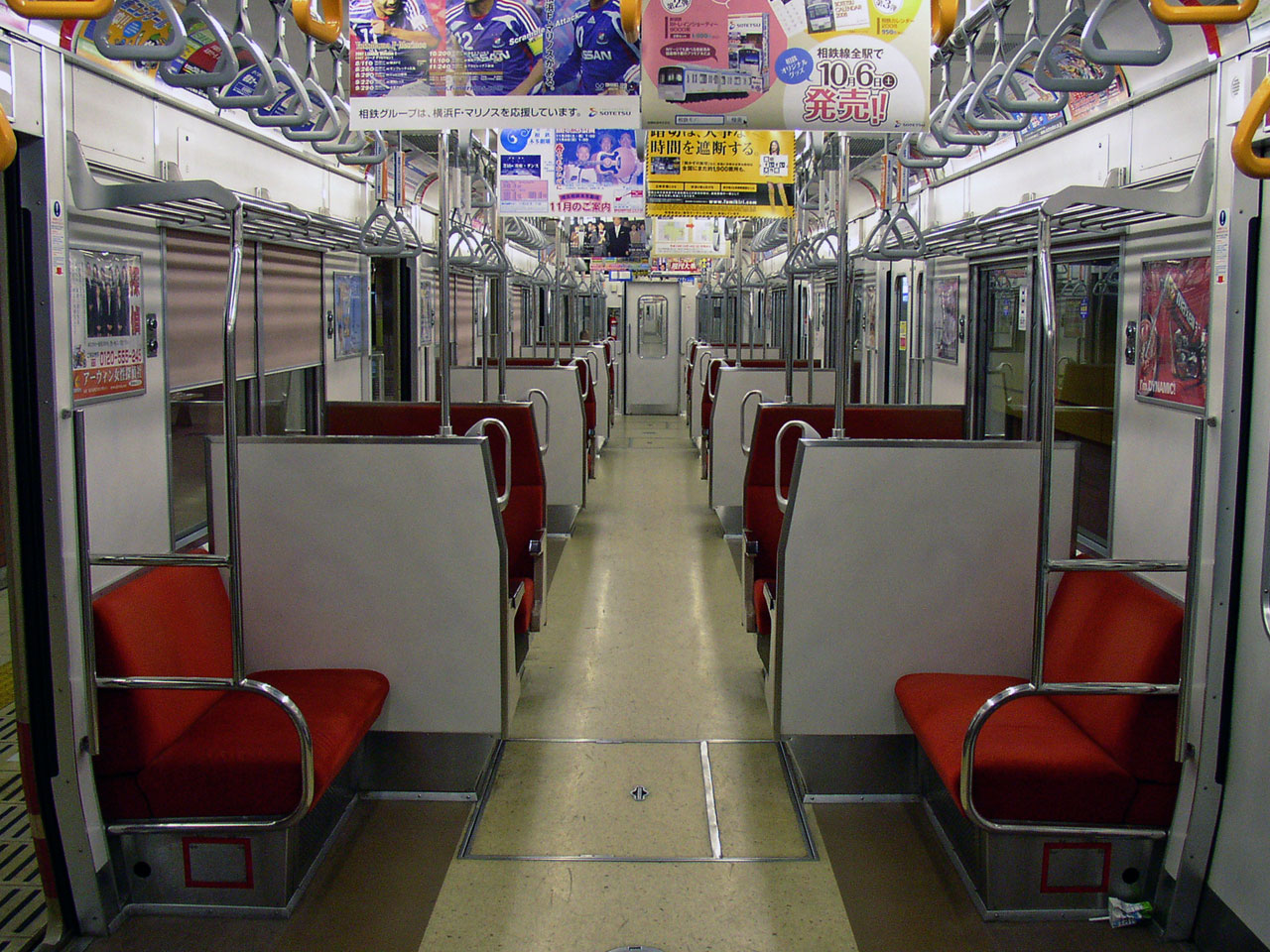
Interior with transverse seating

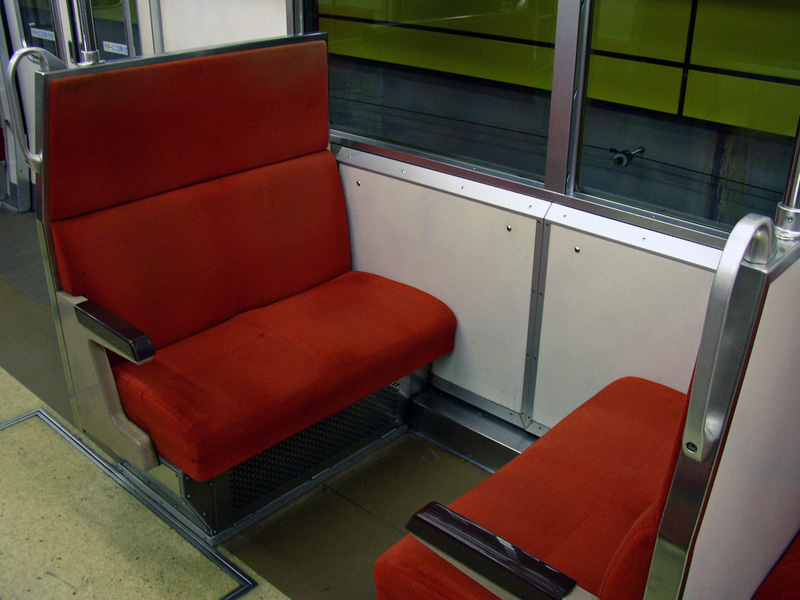
Transverse seating bay

== History ==
The trains were built by Tokyu Car Corporation in Yokohama between 1993 and 2001, with the first trains entering service in 1993. A total of 70 cars were built.

From 2011, the fleet was gradually repainted into the new corporate livery, and some sets received single-arm pantographs in place of the original lozenge type.

Set 9701, which wasn't part of the Yokohama Navy Blue refurbishment programme, was scrapped on 11 December 2020.

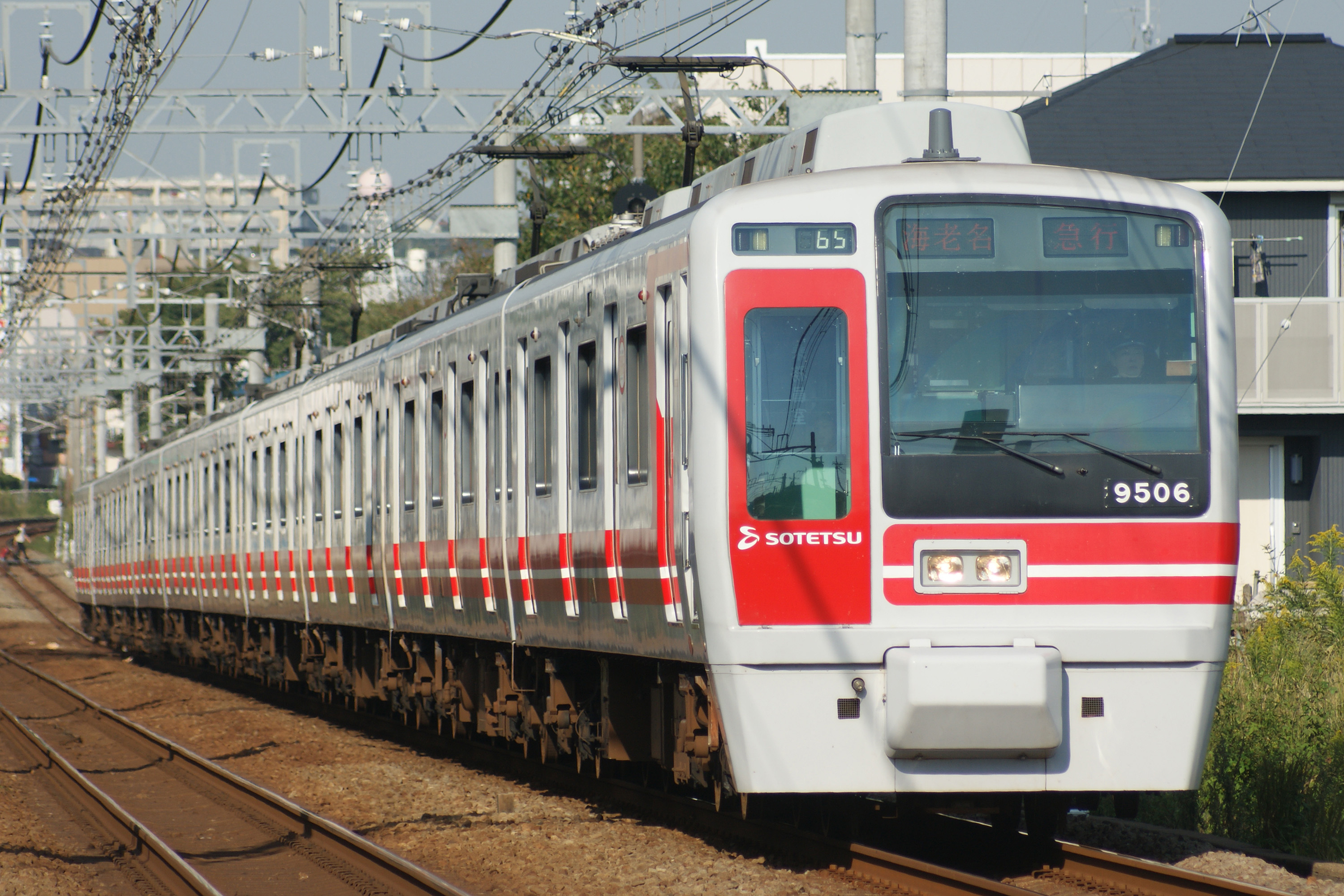
Set 9706 in original livery in October 2008

== Refurbishment ==
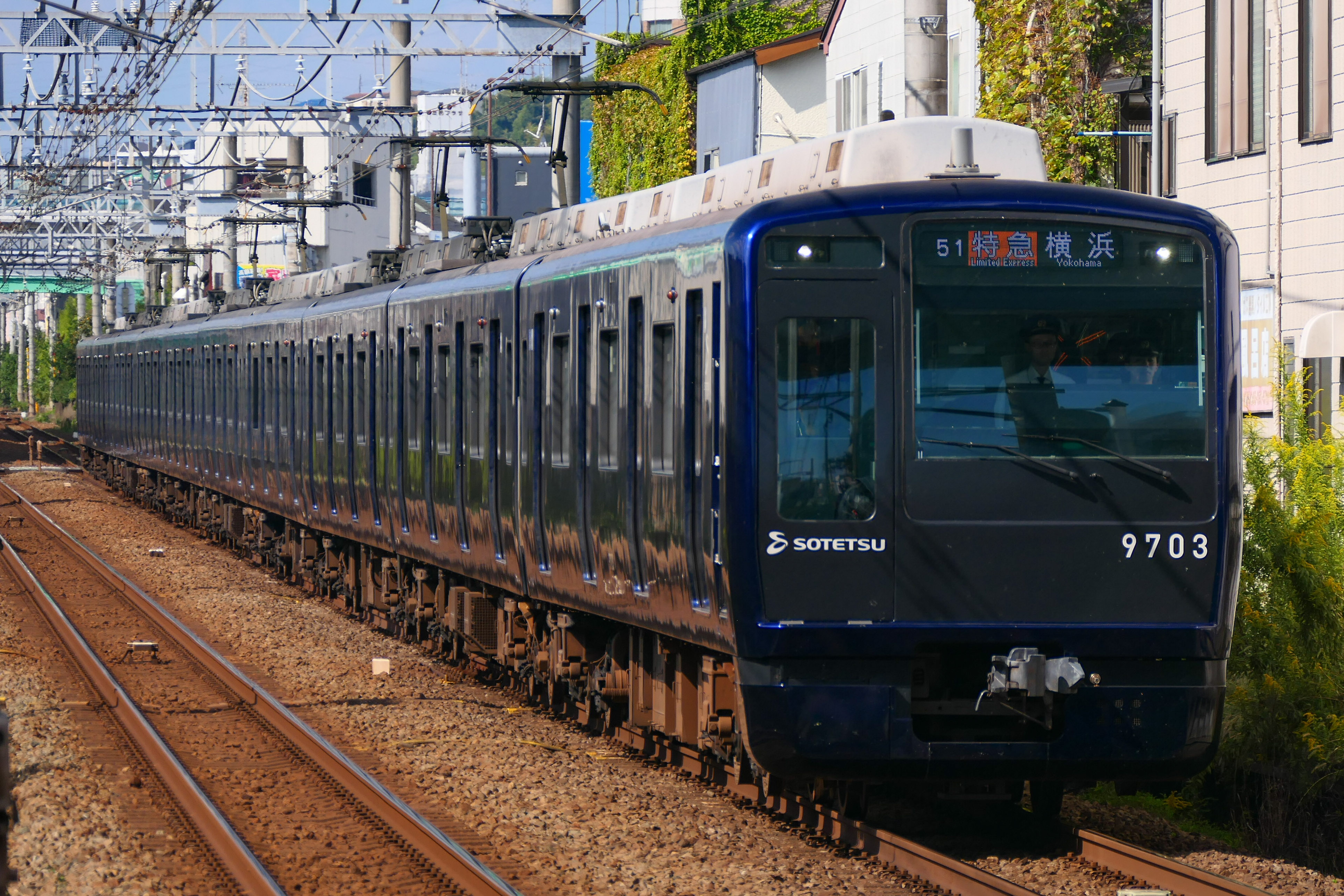
The first set to be refurbished, 9703, in October 2024

From 2016, the 9000 series EMU fleet underwent a programme of refurbishment. This involves new interiors, including leather seat covers on the transverse seating bays, interior lighting that can be adjusted to suit day and night conditions, and a new exterior livery of Yokohama Navy Blue. The first set to be treated, 9703, returned to service in April 2016.

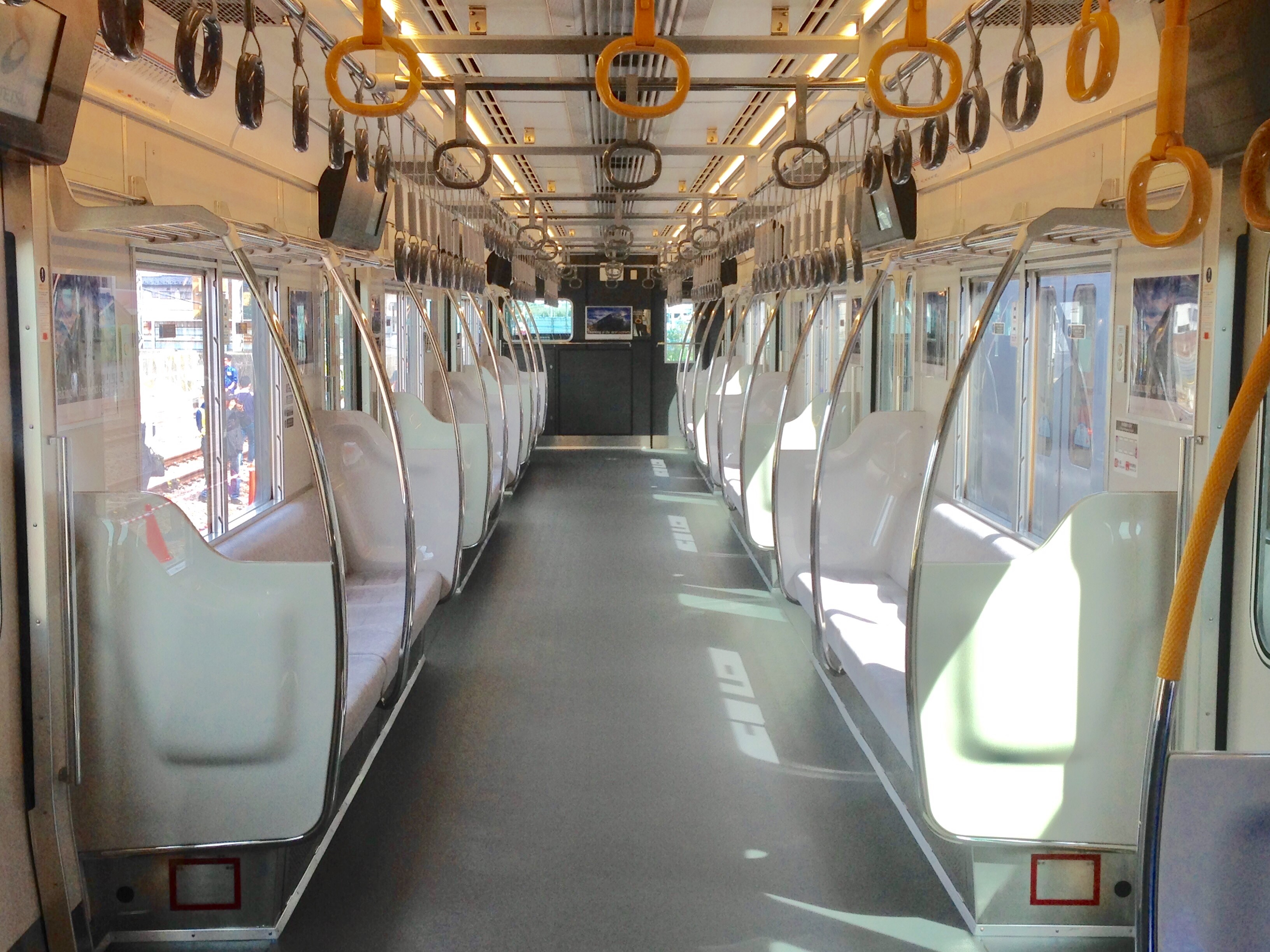
Refurbished interior

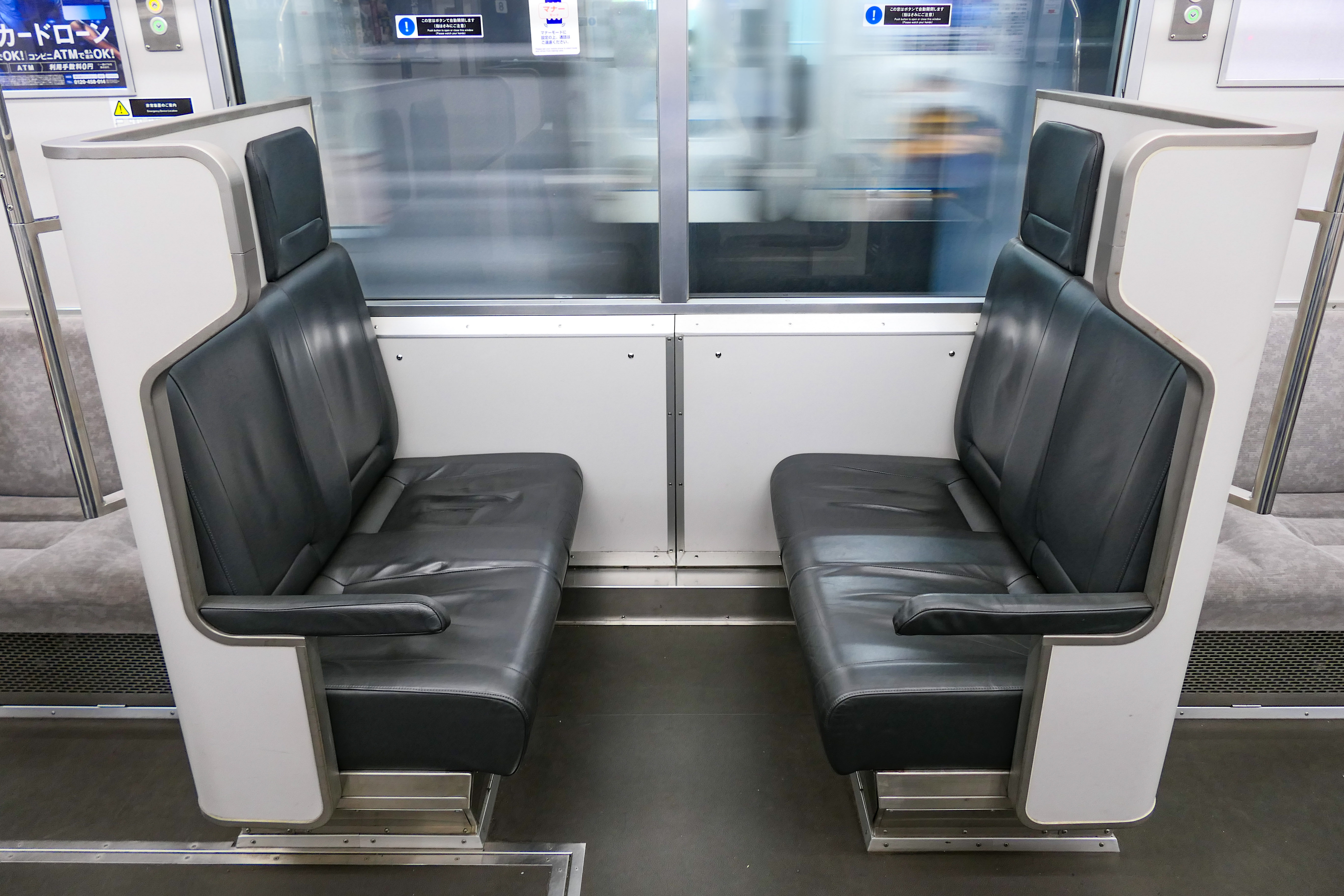
Leather-covered transverse seating

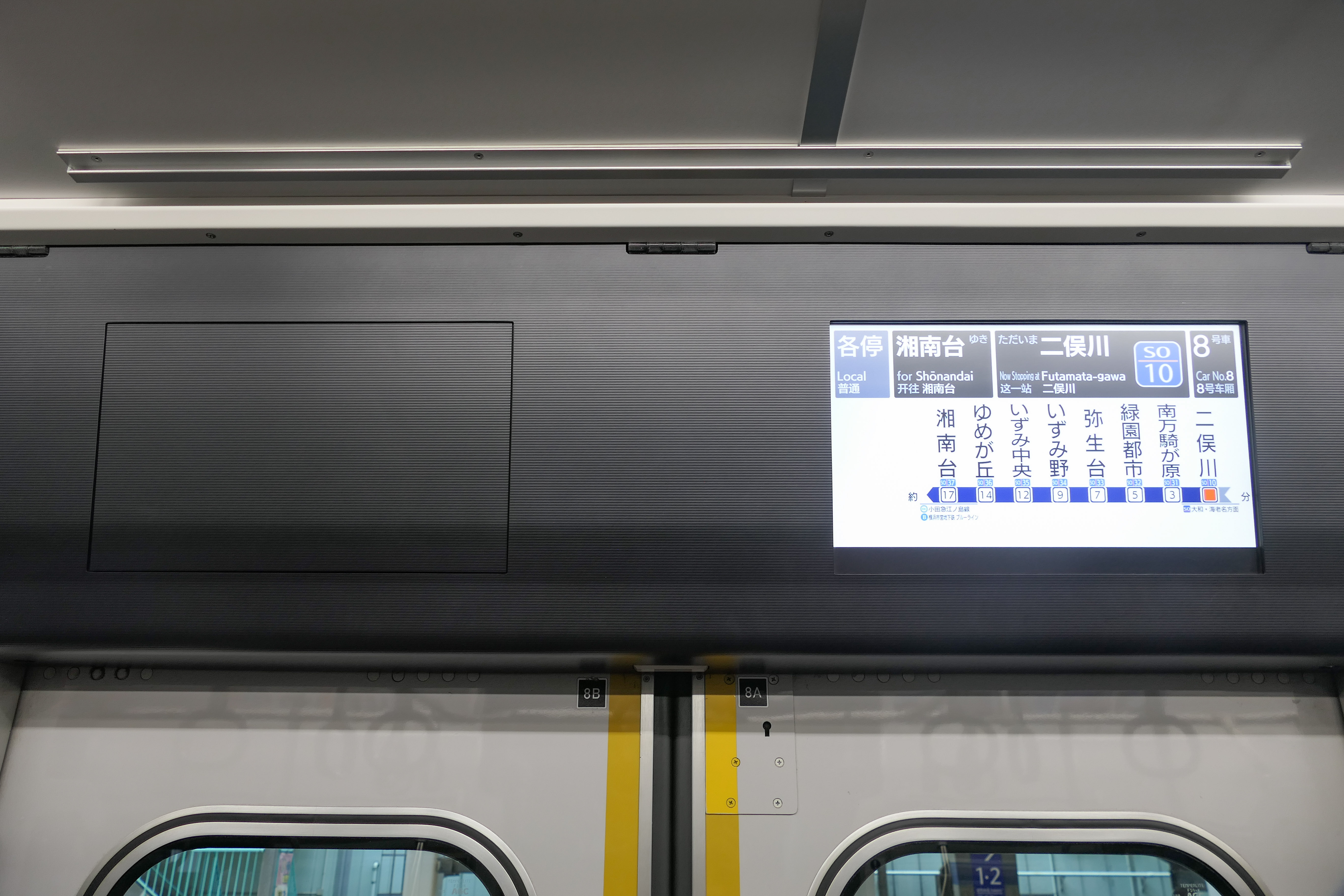
LCD information display
