= 211 series =

Japanese train type

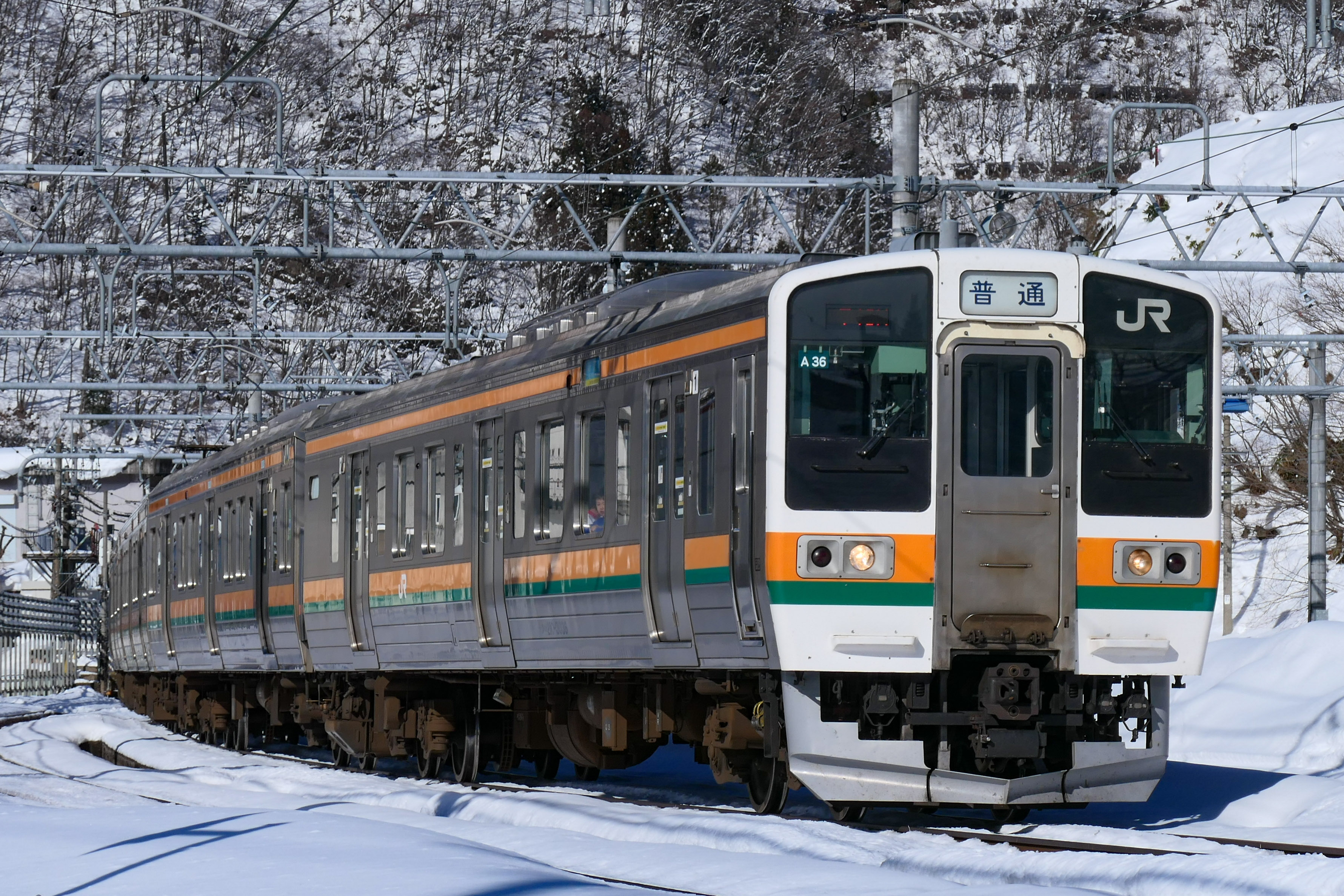
- JR East 211 series set on a Joetsu Line service in January 2021
- Manufacturers: Hitachi; Kawasaki Heavy Industries; Kinki Sharyo; Nippon Sharyo; Tokyu Car Corporation
- Replaced: 111 series, 113 series, 115 series
- Constructed: 1985–1991
- Entered service: March 1986
- Scrapped: 2012–
- Number built: 1,914 vehicles
- Number in service: 849 vehicles (as of 2018)
- Successor: 209 series, E233-3000 series, 315 series (from 2025) E131-200 series
- Operators: ■ JNR (1985–1987); JR East (1987–present); JR Central (1987–2025); JR West (1988–2010); Sangi Railway (from 2024)

Specifications
- Car body construction: Stainless steel Steel (JR West version)
- Car length: 20,000 mm (65 ft 7 in)
- Width: 2,966 mm (9 ft 8.8 in)
- Doors: 3 pairs per side
- Maximum speed: 120 km/h (75 mph) (JR West); 110 km/h (68 mph) (others)
- Traction system: Resistor control + field system superimposed field excitation control
- Traction motors: MT61 (211-0/1000/2000/3000 series); C-MT61A/C-MT64A (211-5000/6000 series)
- Power output: 120 kW
- Acceleration: 1.7 km/(h⋅s) (1.1 mph/s)
- Electric systems: 1,500 V DC overhead catenary
- Current collection: Pantograph
- Bogies: DT50B (motored), TR235B (trailer) (211-0/1000/2000/3000 series); TR235G (SaRo 213/SaRo 212); C-DT56 (motored), C-TR241 (trailer) (211-5000/6000 series); WDT50B (KuMoRo 211/MoRo 210)
- Multiple working: 311/313 series
- Track gauge: 1,067 mm (3 ft 6 in)

The 211 series (211系, 211-kei) is a suburban electric multiple unit (EMU) train type introduced in 1985 by Japanese National Railways (JNR).

The trains are still being used by East Japan Railway Company (JR East). They were also formerly used by West Japan Railway Company (JR West) until 2010 and Central Japan Railway Company (JR Central) until 2025 in Japan.

Sangi Railway will operate a total of eight former 211-5000 series 3-car sets (24 cars) with the first entering service in May, 2025, and Ryutetsu acquired four 211-6000 series 2-car sets (8 cars) on 9 July, 2025.

== Design ==
The 211 series was developed by JNR to replace older 113 series and 115 series trains. The 211 series incorporated regenerative brakes and stainless steel body construction.

== Variants ==
- 211-0 series (basic version with transverse seating)
- 211-1000 series (cold region version with transverse seating)
- 211-2000 series (basic version with all longitudinal seating)
- 211-3000 series (cold region version with all longitudinal seating)
- 211-5000 series (JR Central version)
- 211-6000 series (JR Central version with single motored car)
- Joyful Train variants (JR West version)

== Operations ==
=== 211-0, 211-2000 series ===
- Tōkaidō Main Line and Ito Line: Tokyo – Numazu/Ito (From 1986 - April 2012)
- Tōkaidō Main Line: Hamamatsu – Maibara
- Chūō Main Line: Tachikawa – Shiojiri
- Shinonoi Line: Shiojiri – Shinonoi
- Shinetsu Line: Shinonoi – Nagano
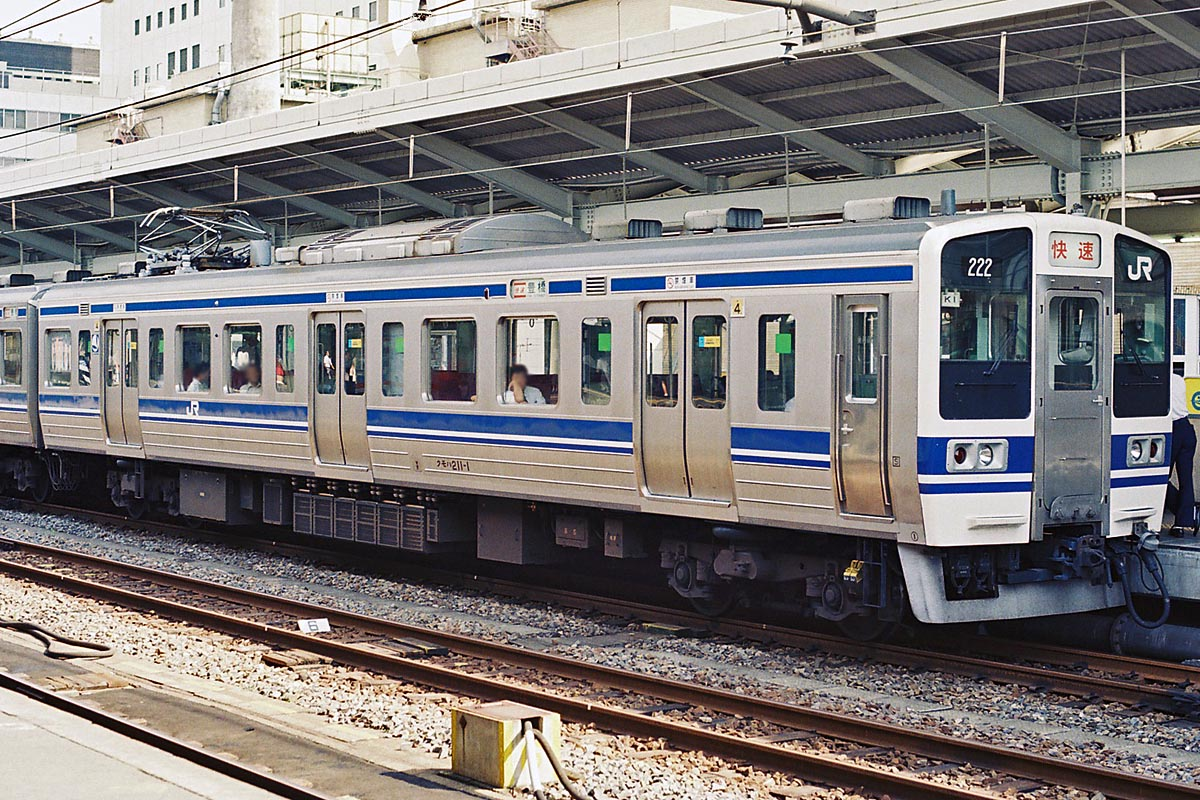
211-0 series in original JNR livery in August 1988

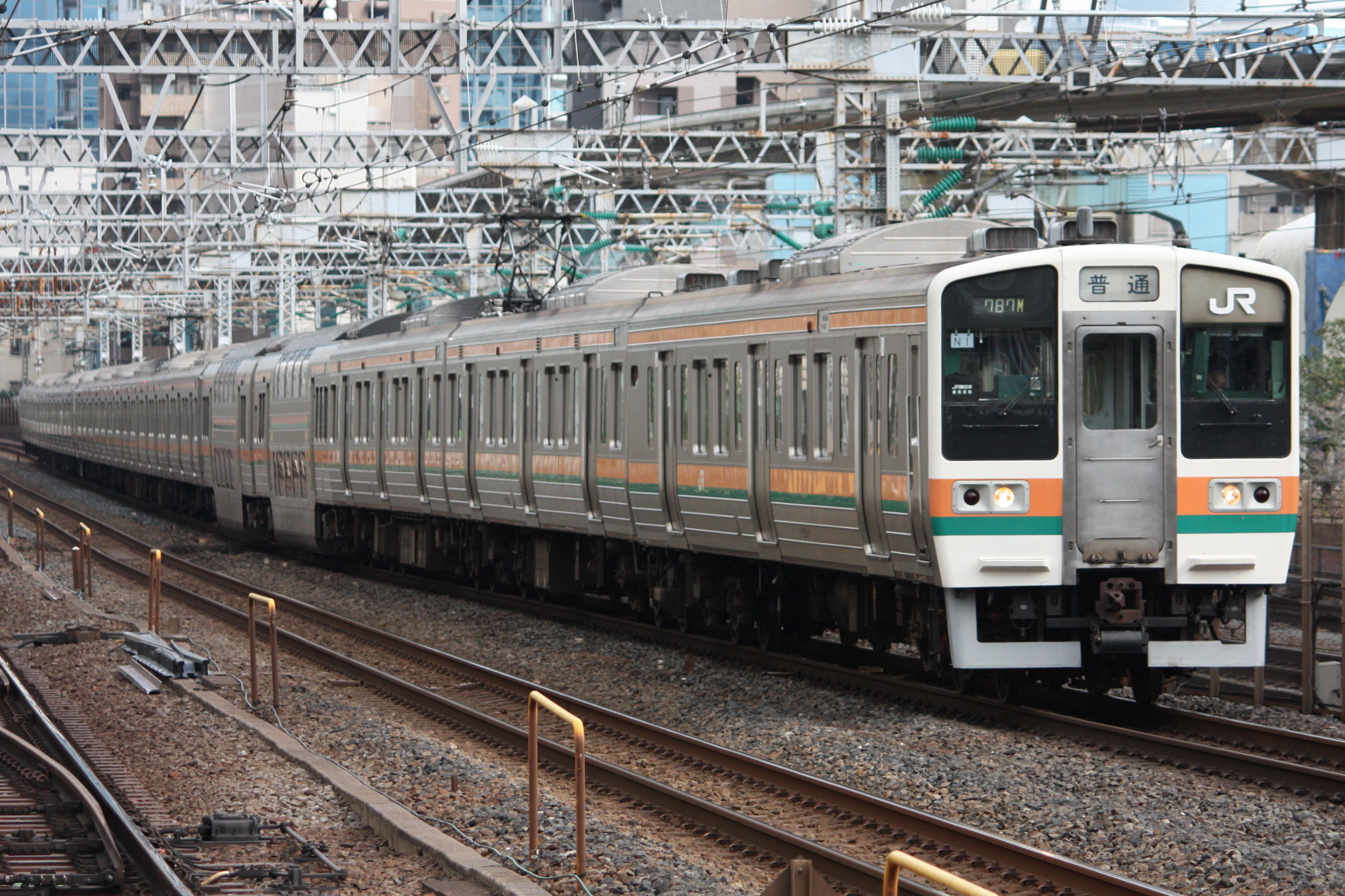
211-0 series in JR livery in December 2009

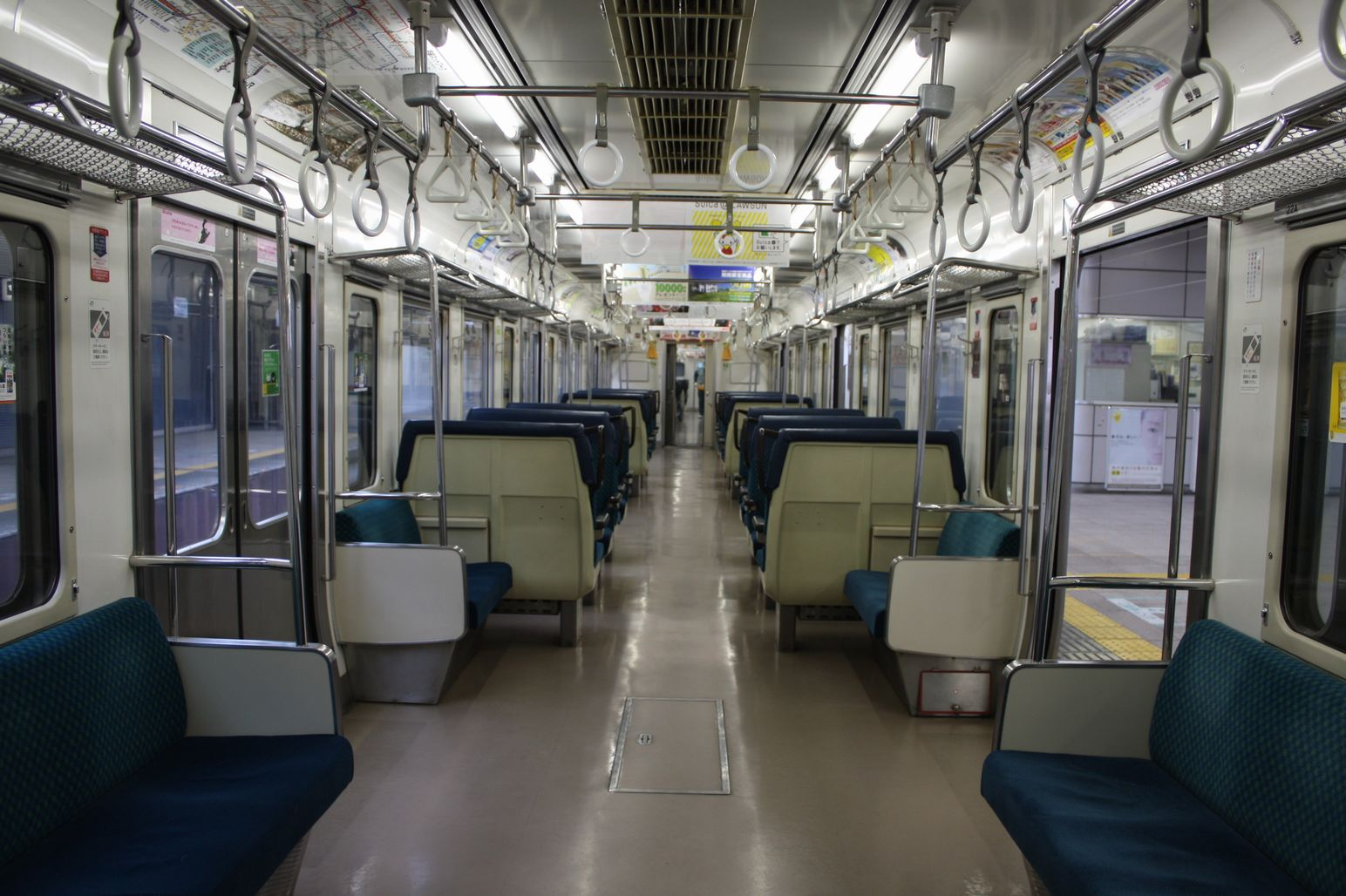
211-0 series interior view, February 2010

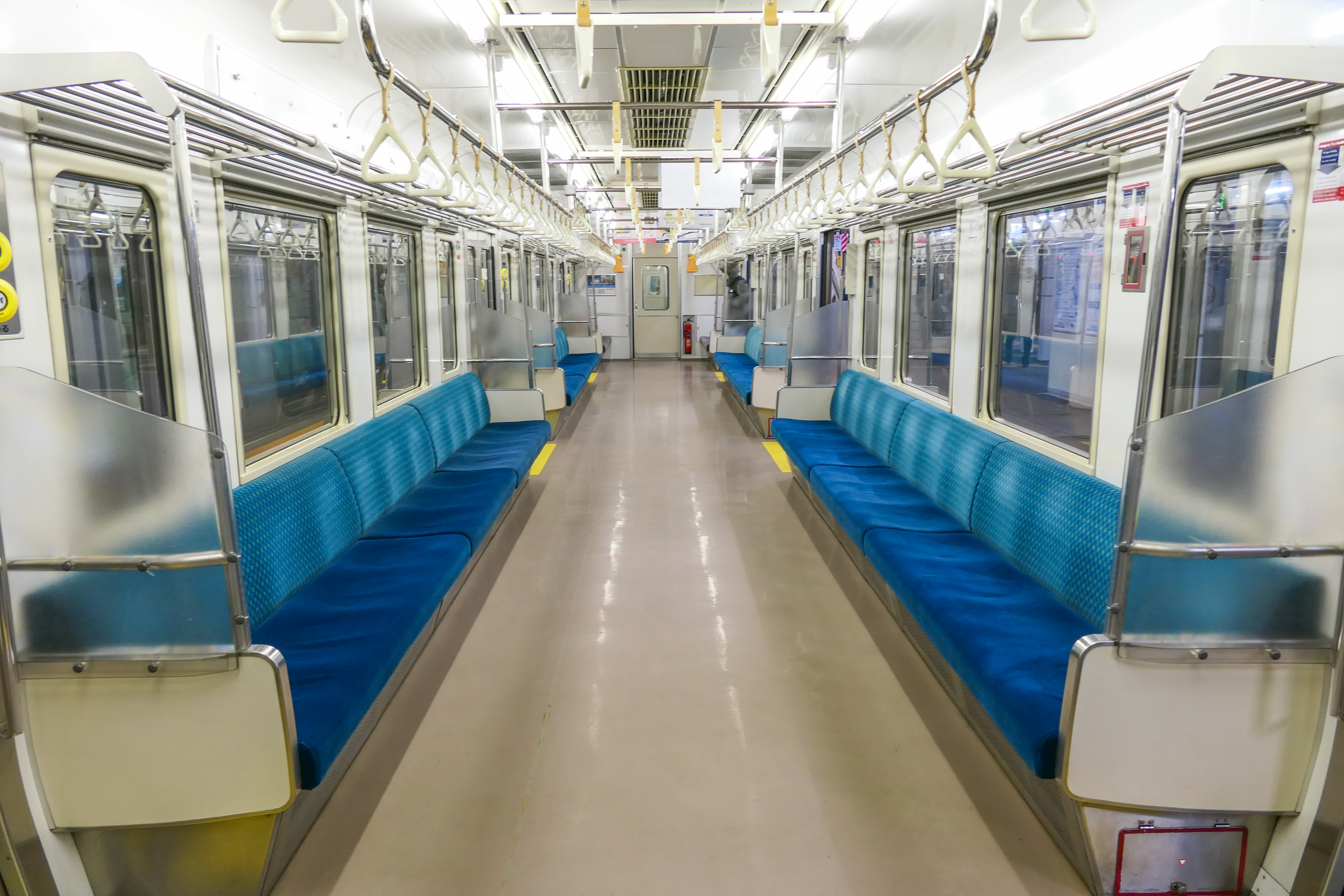
211-2000 series interior view, November 2021

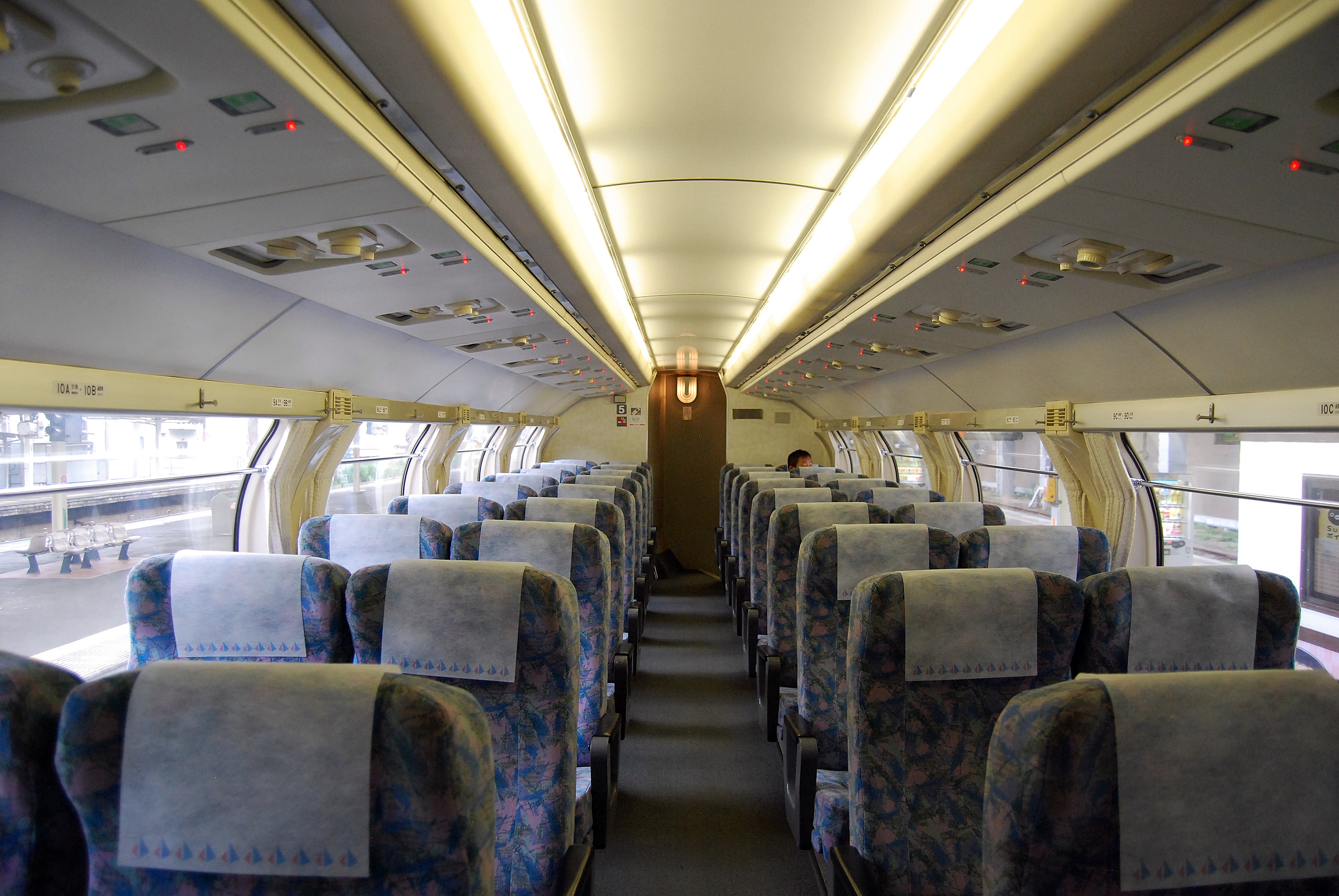
Green car seating, July 2010

=== 211-1000, 211-3000 series ===
- Tohoku Main Line: Oyama – Utsunomiya(until March 2019)
- Takasaki Line: Ueno - Takasaki (1986 - March 2014)
- Ryomo Line: Takasaki – Oyama
- Shinetsu Line: Takasaki – Yokokawa
- Oito Line: Matsumoto –Shinano-Omachi(until March 2027)
- Chuo Main Line: Takao – Shiojiri/Shiojiri – Nakatsugawa(until March 2027)
- Shinonoi Line: Shiojiri – Shinonoi
- Shinetsu Main Line: Shinonoi – Nagano(until March 2027)
- Sobu Main Line: Chiba – Chōshi (via Yachimata) (21 October 2006 – 2012)
- Narita Line: Chiba – Chōshi (via Narita) (21 October 2006 – 2012)
- Kashima Line: Sawara – Kashima-Jingu (21 October 2006 – 2012)
- Togane Line (since 21 October 2006 – 2012)
- Uchibo Line: Chiba – Awa-Kamogawa (via Kisarazu) (21 October 2006 – 2012)
- Sotobo Line: Chiba – Awa-Kamogawa (via Katsuura) (21 October 2006 – 2012)
- Iida Line (since 15 March 2014)
- Agatsuma Line (since 22 August 2016)
- Joetsu Line: Takasaki - Minakami (since 23 August 2016)
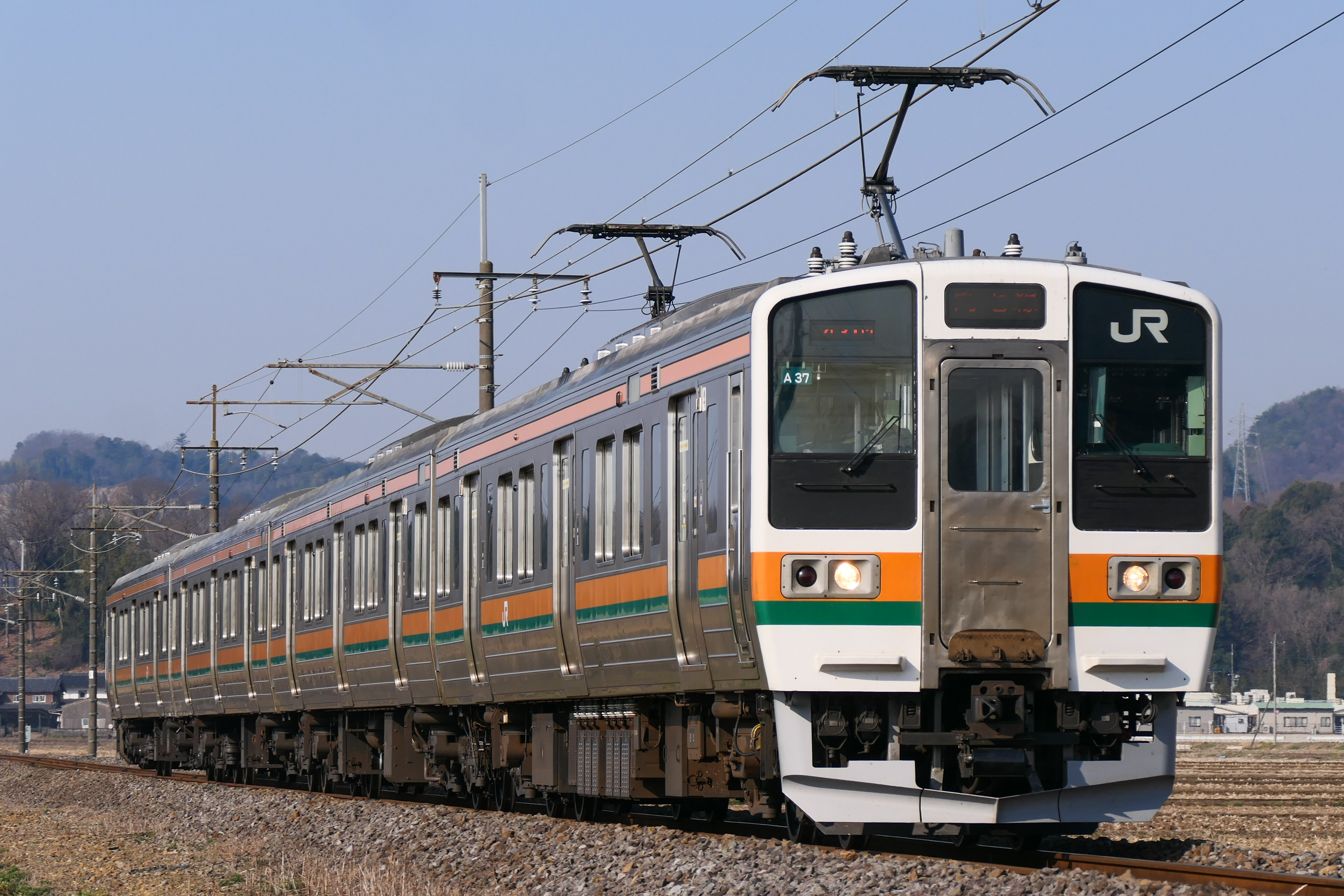
211-3000 series with additional pantograph in March 2022

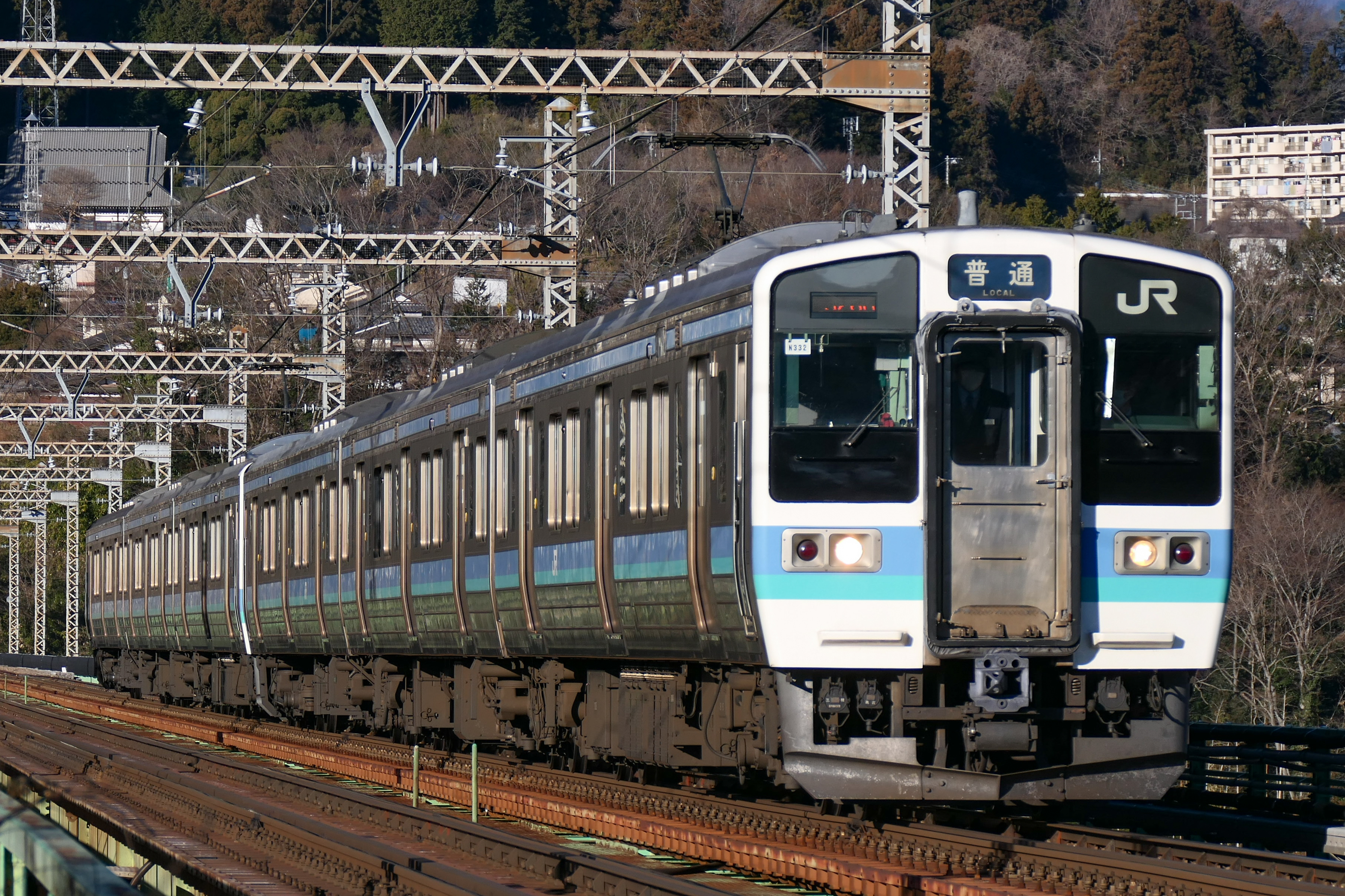
211-3000 series in Nagano area livery in January 2022

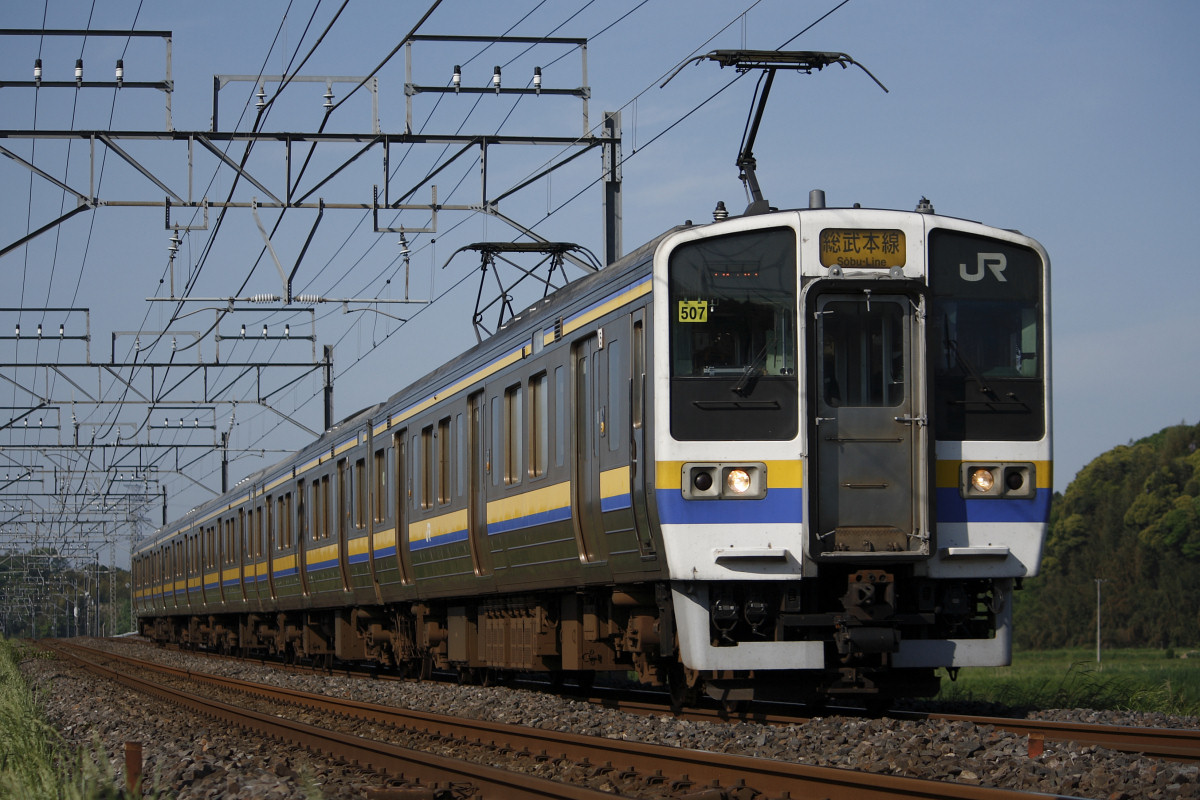
211-3000 series in Chiba area livery in May 2010

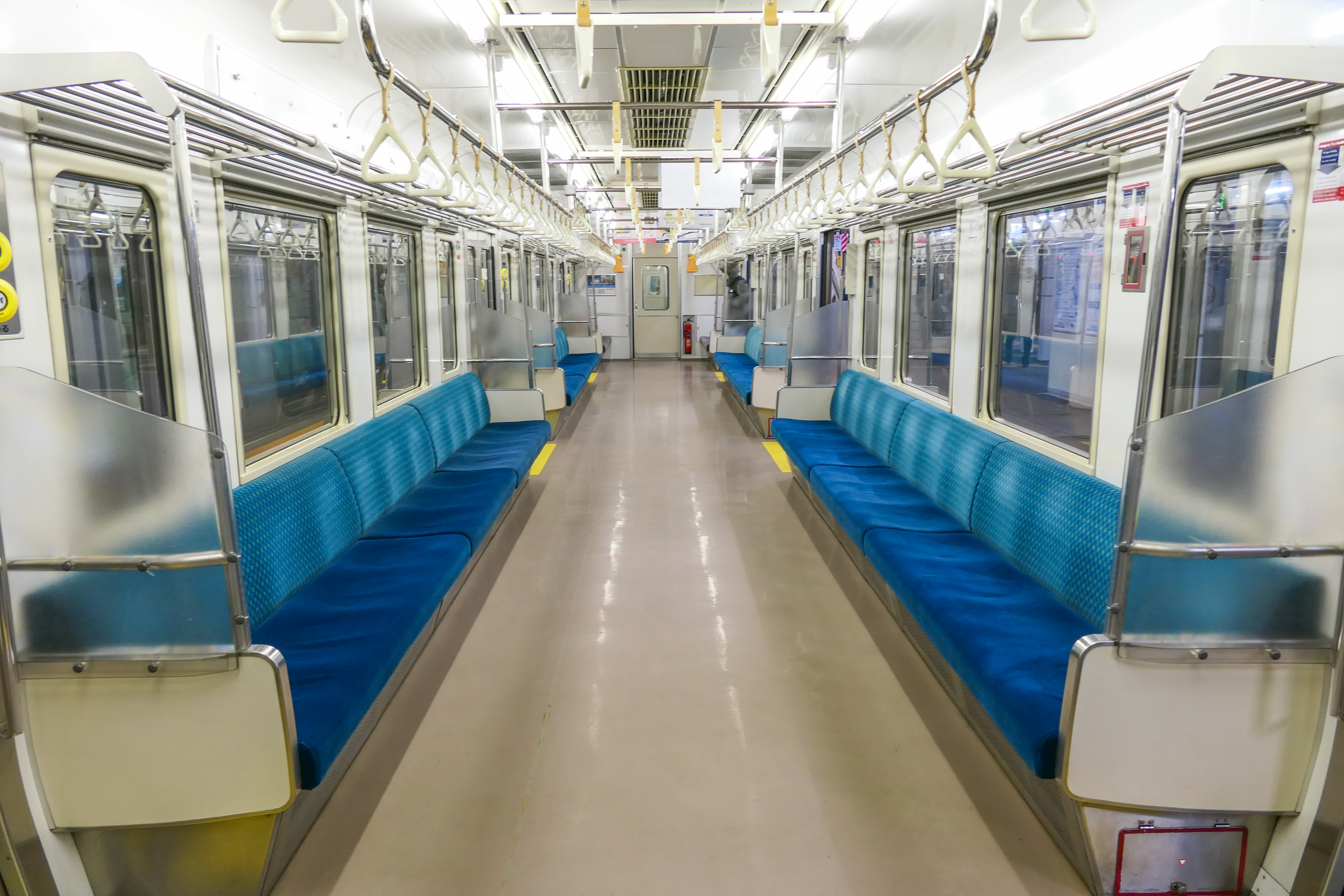
211-3000 series interior view, February 2022

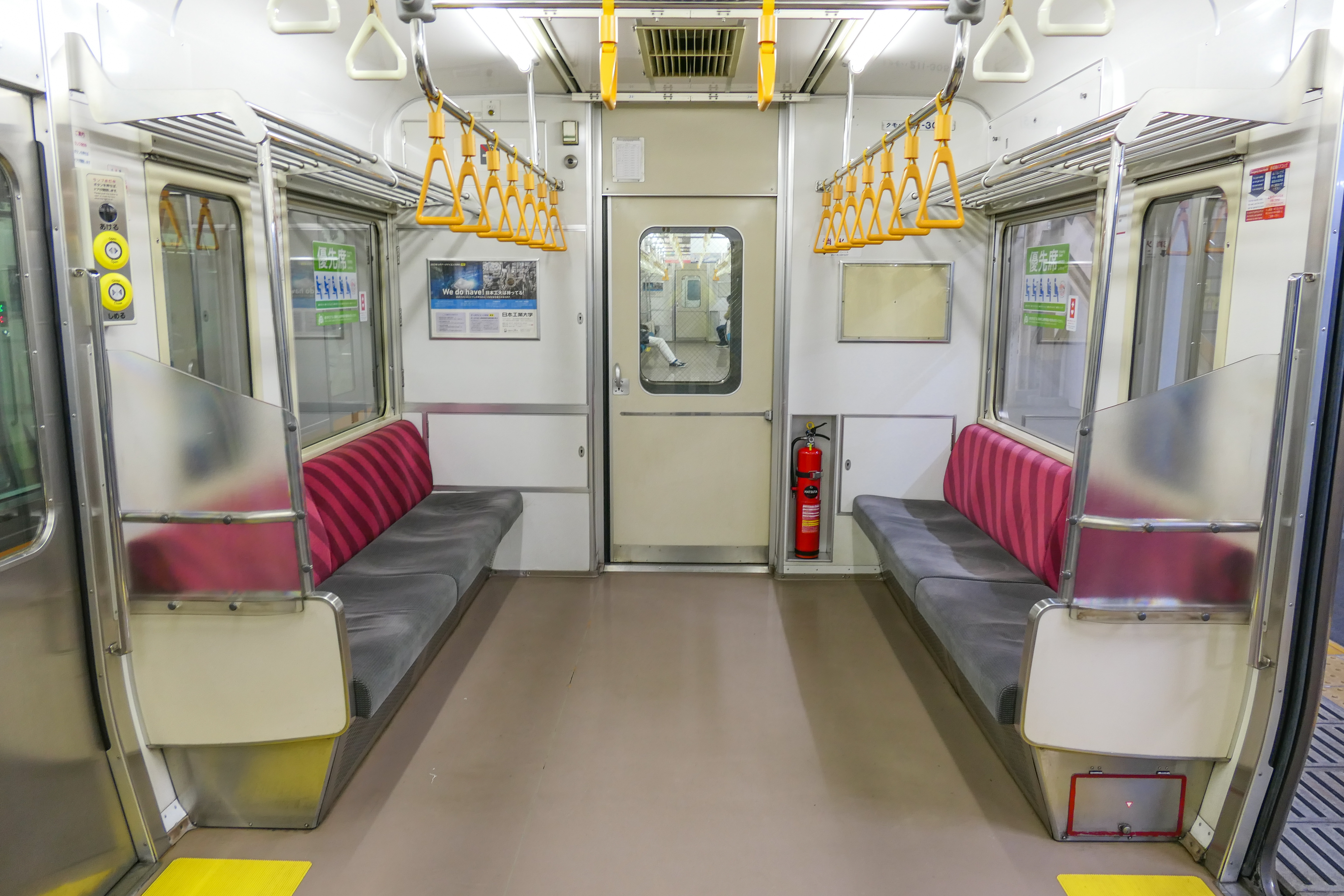
Priority seats, February 2022

=== 211-5000, 211-6000 series ===
- Tokaido Main Line: Atami – Toyohashi
- Chuo Main Line: Nagoya – Nakatsugawa
- Kansai Main Line: Nagoya – Kameyama
- Gotemba Line: Kōzu – Numazu (until 2025)
- Minobu Line: Fuji – Nishi-Fujinomiya
- Aichi Loop Line: Kozoji – Setoguchi
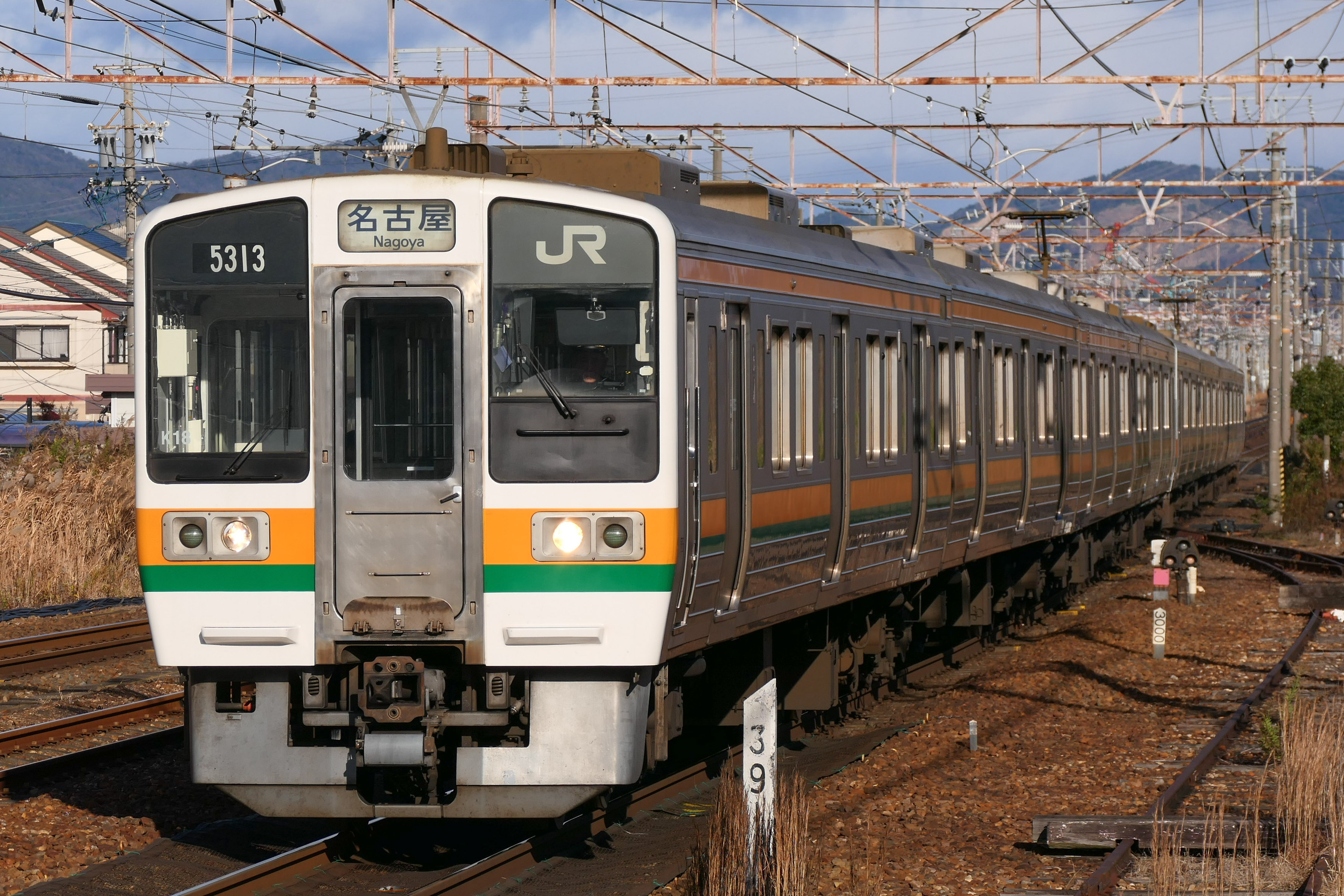
211-5000 series in December 2019

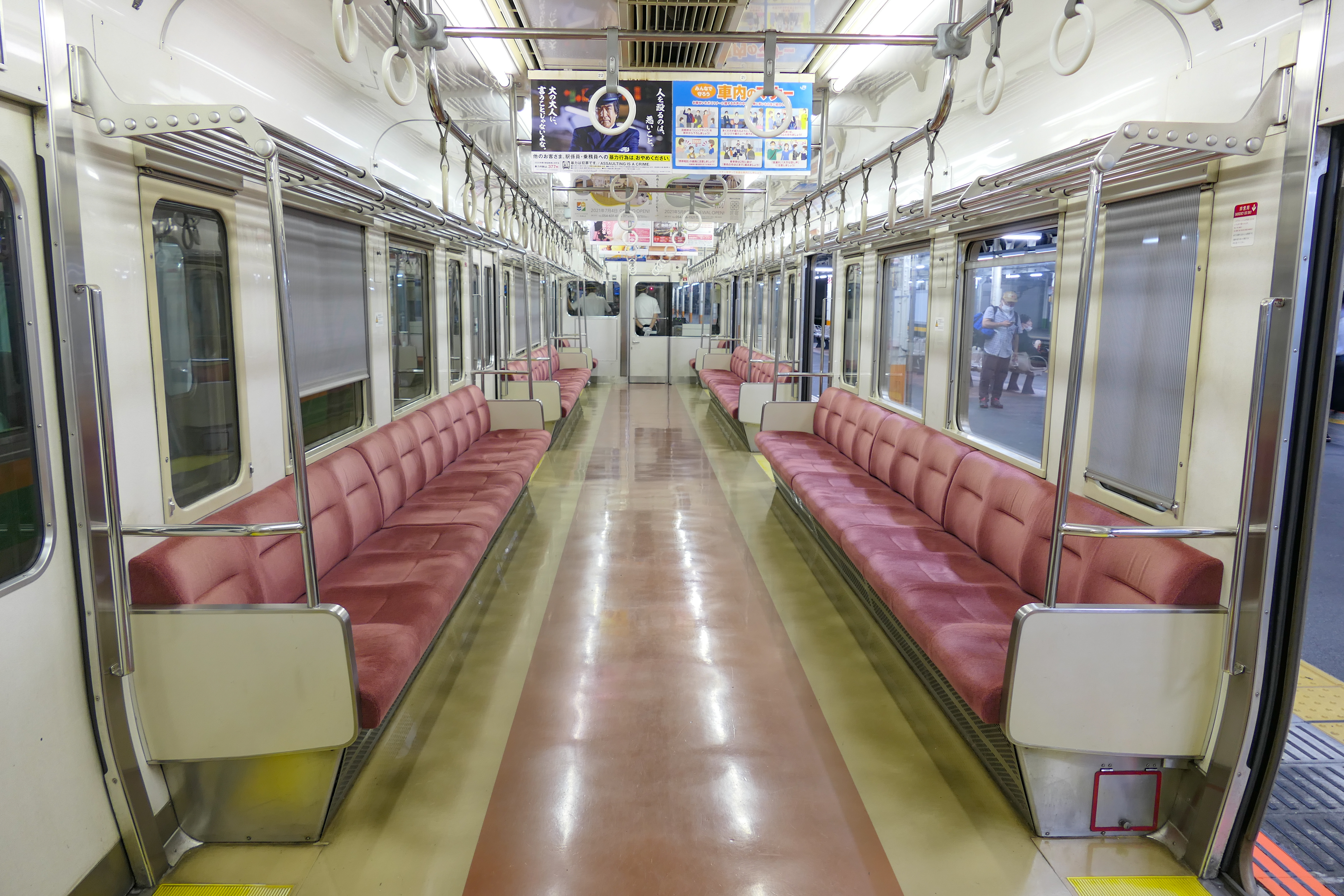
211-5000 series interior view, September 2021

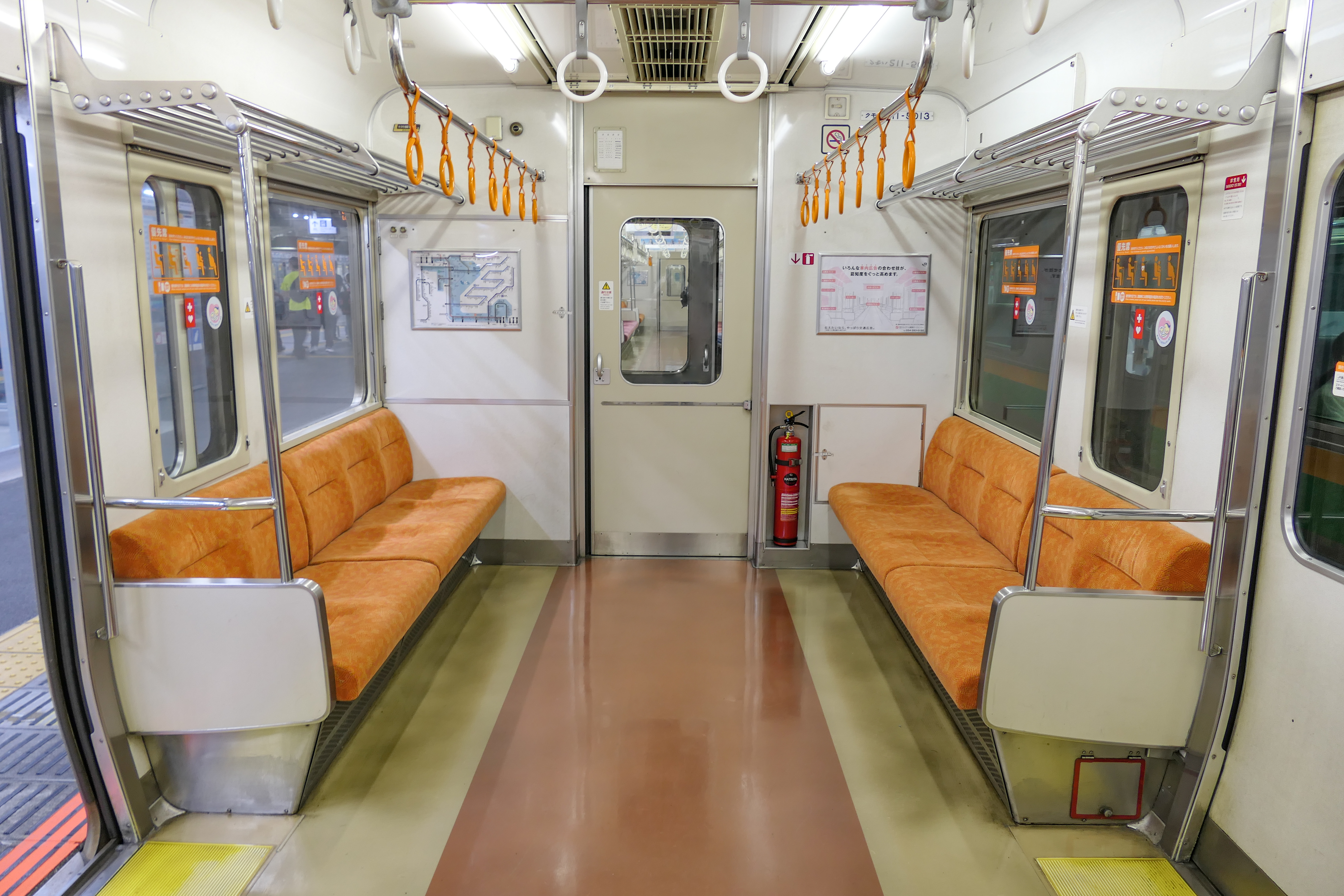
Priority seats, September 2021

==== Sangi Railway ====
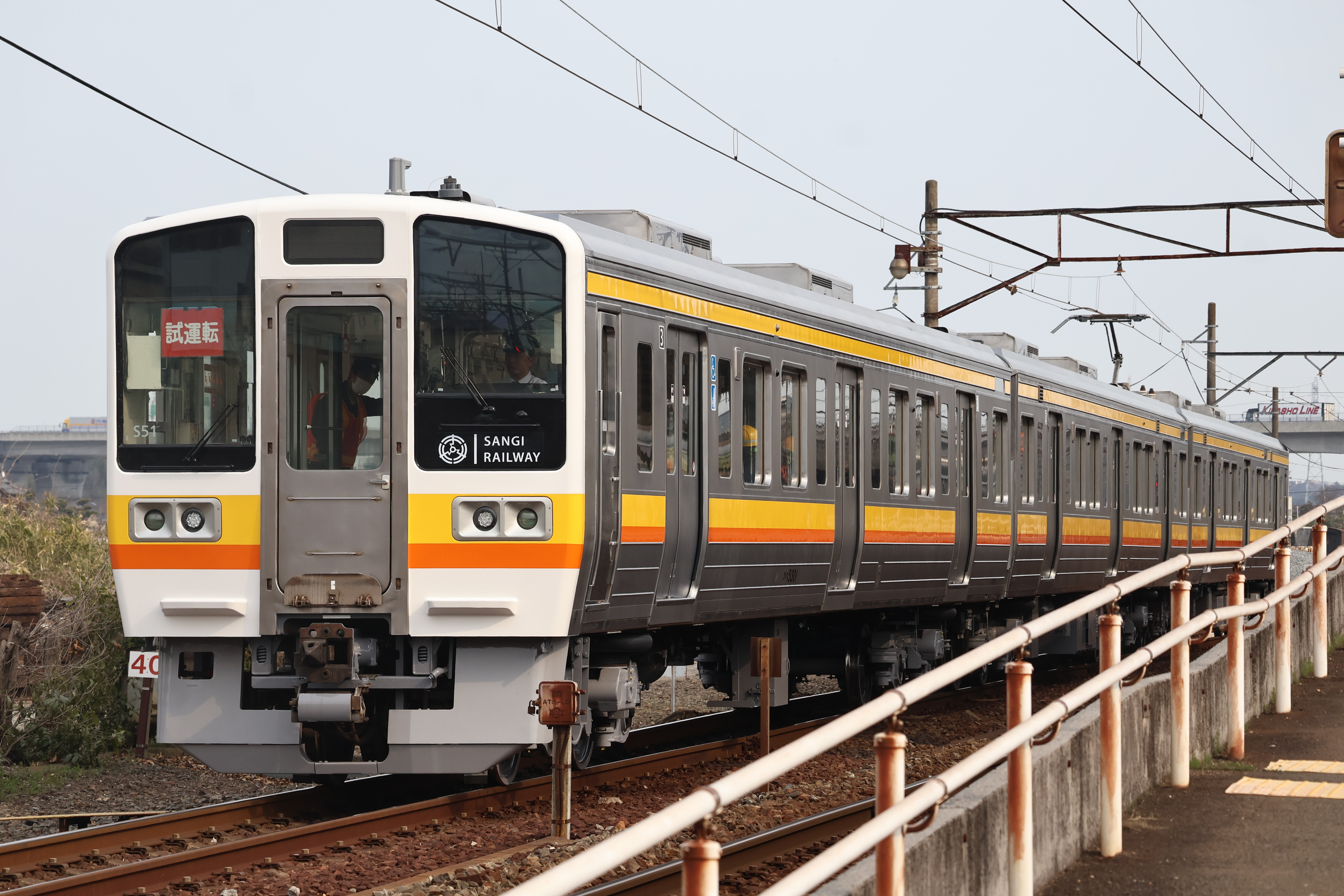
A Sangi Railway 5000 series set in March 2025

On 20 and 22 March 2024, JR Central transferred five 211-5000 series 3-car sets to Sangi Railway. On 10 March, 2025, they announced that they will operate a total of eight former 211-5000 series 3-car sets (24 cars).

==== Ryutetsu ====
On 9 July, 2025, Ryutetsu announced that they had purchased four 211-6000 series 2-car sets GG5/GG6/GG8/GG9 (8 cars) from JR Central. The trains will be refurbished before entering service to replace their current 5000 series (former Seibu New 101 series) trains.

== Joyful Train sets ==
- Super Saloon Yumeji: Three-car set converted from 211 and 213 series coaches which entered service in 1988 and withdrawn in March 2010. Operated by JR-West and based at Okayama Depot.
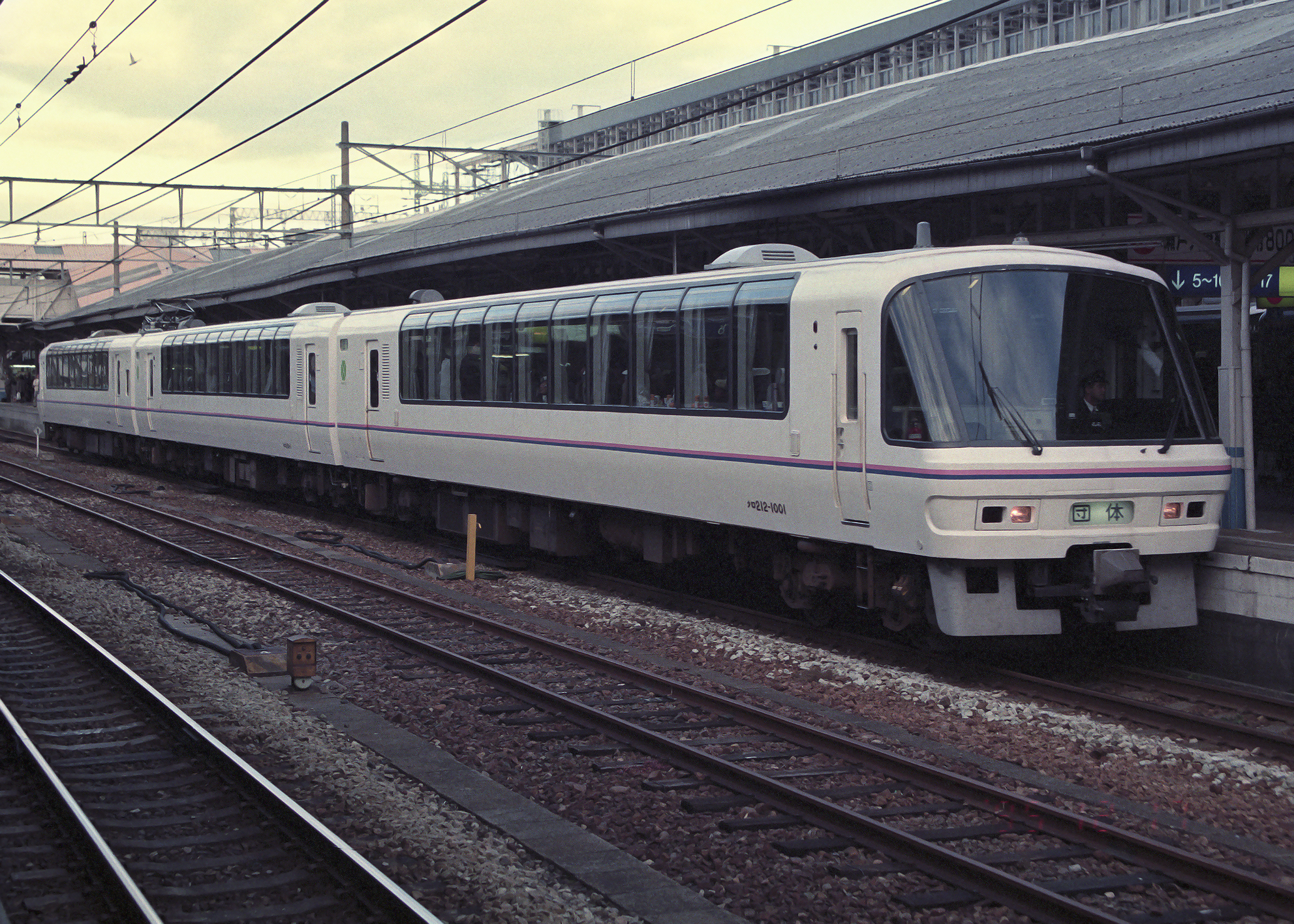
Super Saloon Yumeji in 1990

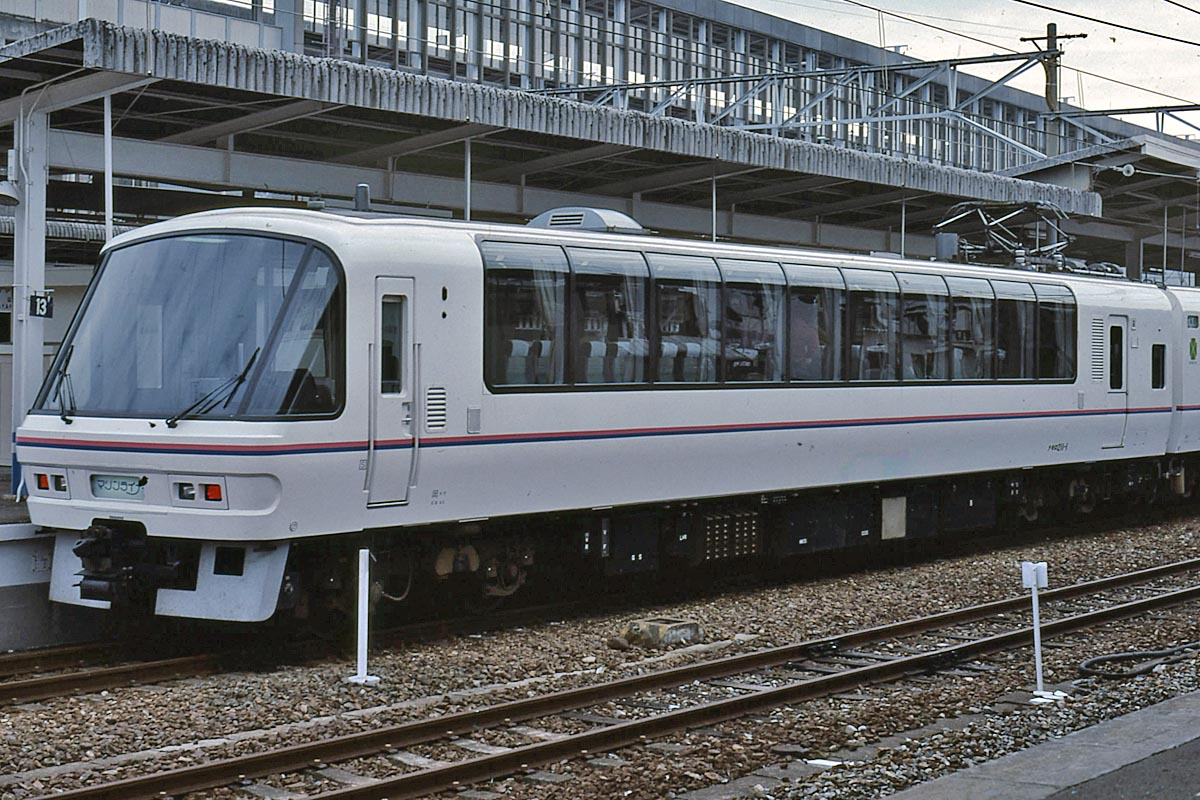
Joyful Train 211 series in JR-West Livery in January 1989

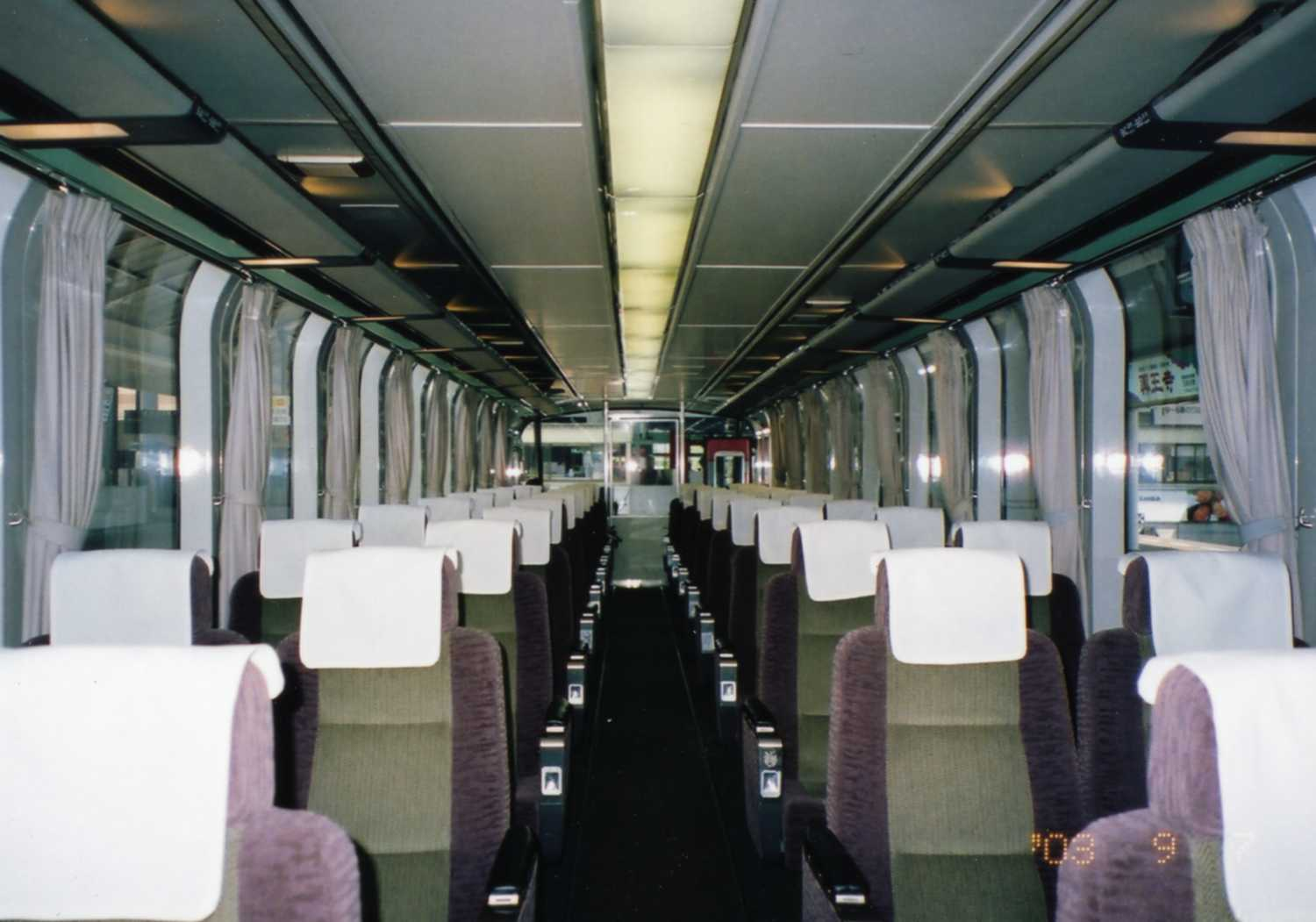
Interior view, September 2003

== See also ==
- 213 series
- 311 series
