= 213 series =

Japanese train type

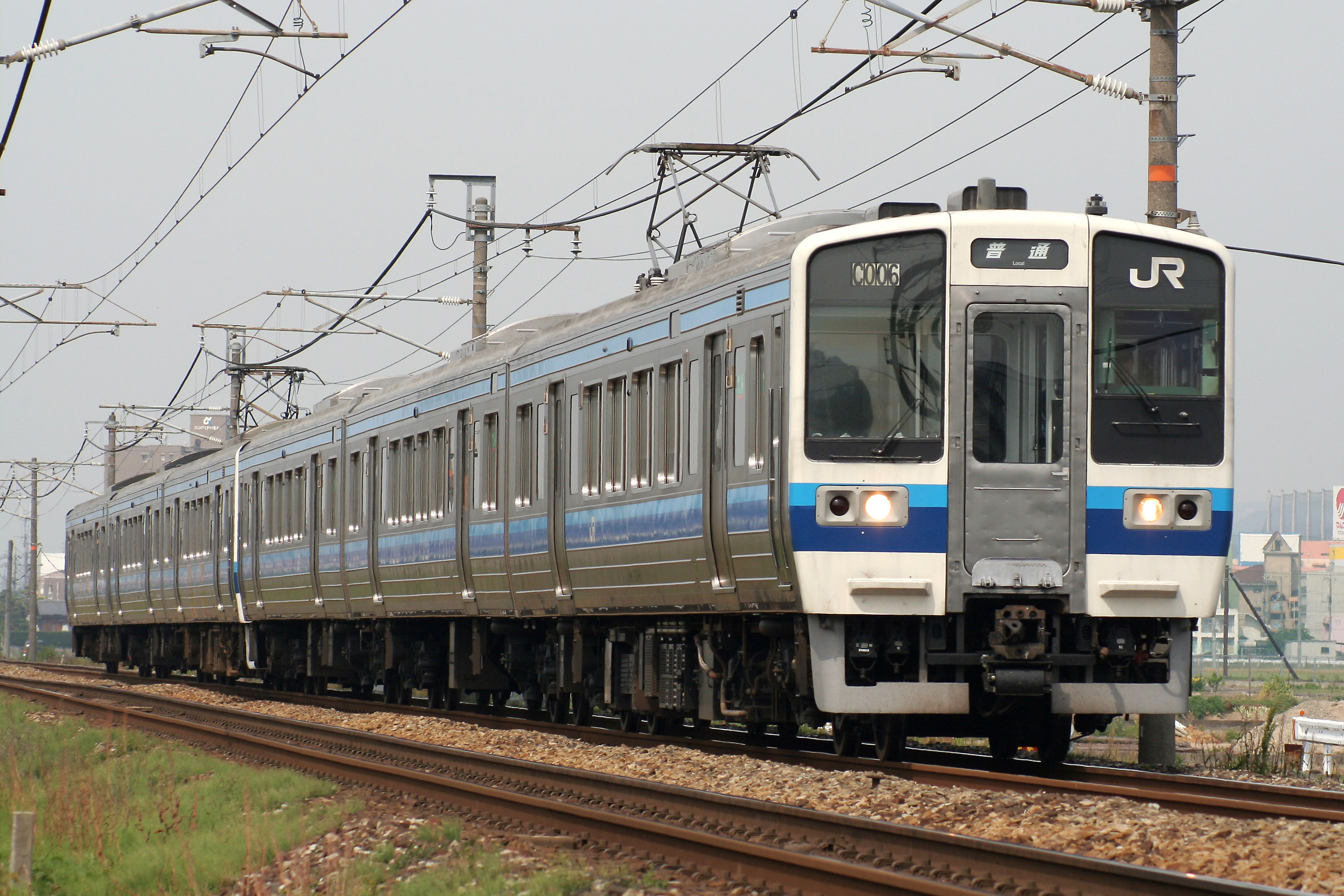
- JR-West 213-0 series
- Manufacturers: Hitachi, Kawasaki Heavy Industries, Kinki Sharyo, Nippon Sharyo, Tokyu Car Corporation
- Replaced: 119 series
- Constructed: 1987–1991
- Entered service: March 1987
- Number built: 65 vehicles
- Number in service: 26 vehicles (JR West); 28 vehicles (JR Central) (as of 2019)
- Number scrapped: 7 vehicles, 2 vehicles (U@tech)
- Successor: 315 series (JR Central)
- Operators: JNR (22–31 March 1987); JR-West (1 April 1987–Present); JR Central (1989–Present)

Specifications
- Car body construction: Stainless steel Steel (KuRo 212)
- Car length: 20,000 mm (65 ft 7 in)
- Width: 2,950 mm (9 ft 8 in)
- Doors: 2 pairs per side
- Maximum speed: 110 km/h (68.4 mph); 130 km/h (80.8 mph)(U@tech)
- Traction system: Resistor control + field system superimposed field excitation control IGBT-VVVF (U@tech train)
- Traction motors: MT64, C-MT64A
- Electric system: 1,500 V DC
- Current collection: overhead catenary
- Bogies: DT50B(powered car),TR235B(trailer car)(213-0 series); WTR235(KuRo 212); WTR235BX(SaYa 213); WTR235XB(KuYa 212); C-DT56(powered car),C-TR241(trailer car)(213-5000 series)
- Safety systems: ATS-SW (213-0 series), ATS-ST (213-5000 series), ATS-P (213-0 series(U@tech))
- Multiple working: 313 series 223 series (U@tech)
- Track gauge: 1,067 mm (3 ft 6 in)

The 213 series (213系, 213-kei) is a suburban electric multiple unit (EMU) train type introduced in March 1987 by Japanese National Railways (JNR) shortly before its breakup and privatization, and currently operated by West Japan Railway Company (JR-West) and Central Japan Railway Company (JR Central) in Japan. It is based on the earlier 211 series, although it differs in having two pairs of doors per side on each car instead of three.

== Operations ==
From 1988 to 2003, the JR-West sets were mainly used for the Marine Liner service connecting Okayama and Takamatsu via the Great Seto Bridge. These trains sometimes used a panoramic cab car (numbered KuRo 212), the latter was scrapped in 2008.

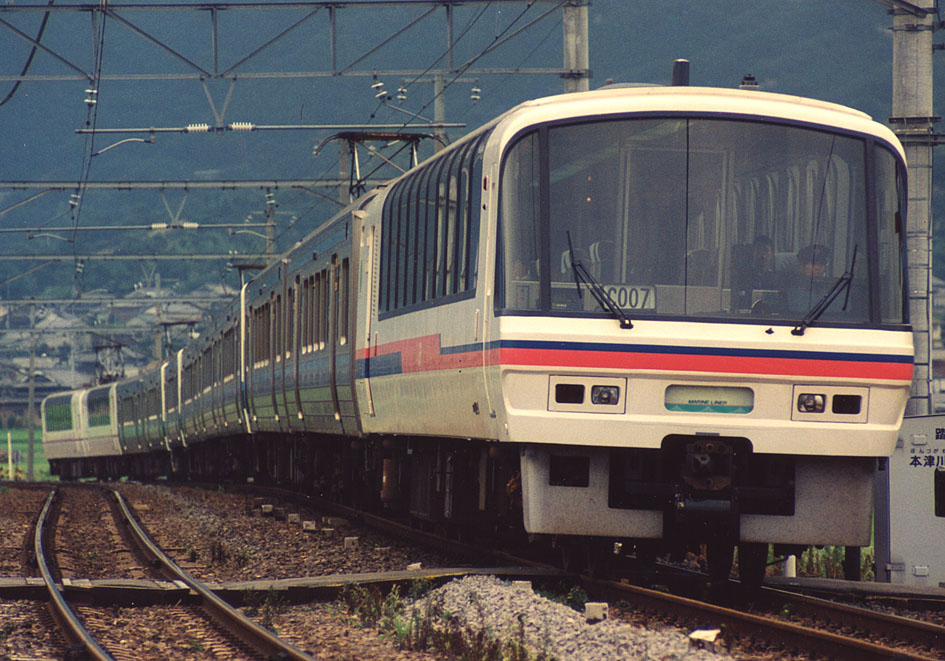
KuRo 212 panoramic coach in 1988

== Formations ==
=== JR-West ===
==== 3-car sets ====
Car No.	1	2	3
Designation	T'c	T	Mc
Numbering	KuHa 212-0	SaHa 213-0	KuMoHa 213-0
Capacity Total/Seated	66/58	76/64	68/60
Designation	T'c		Mc
Numbering	KuHa 212-8	KuHa 212-7	KuMoHa 213-10
Capacity Total/Seated	66/58		68/60

==== 2-car sets ====
Car No.	1	2
Designation	T'c	Mc
Numbering	KuHa 212-0	KuMoHa 213-0
Capacity Total/Seated	66/58	68/60
Numbering	KuHa 212-100	KuMoHa 213-0
Capacity Total/Seated	114/72	68/60

==== U@tech ====
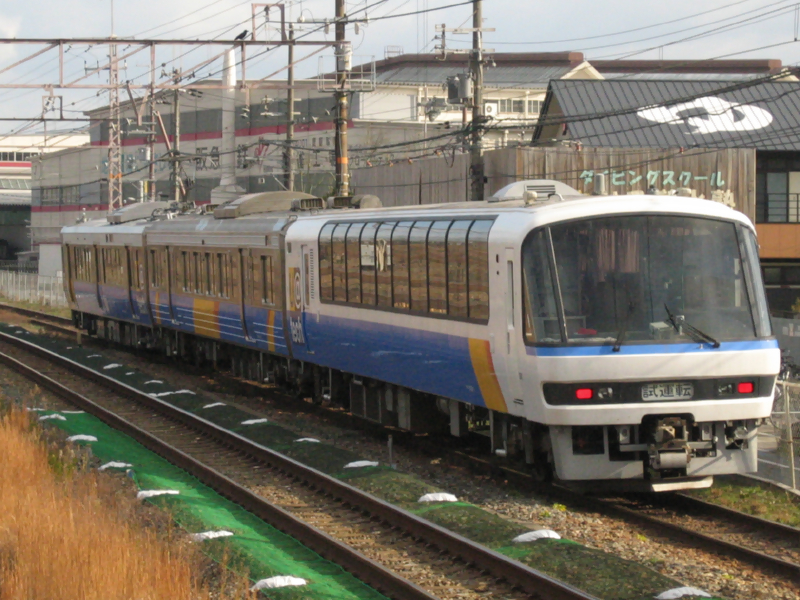
KuYa 212-1 U@tech, 2006

Car No.	1	2	3
Designation	T'zc	Tz	Mzc
Numbering	KuYa 212-1	SaYa 213-1	KuMoYa 223-9001
Capacity	Non-passenger		

=== JR Central ===
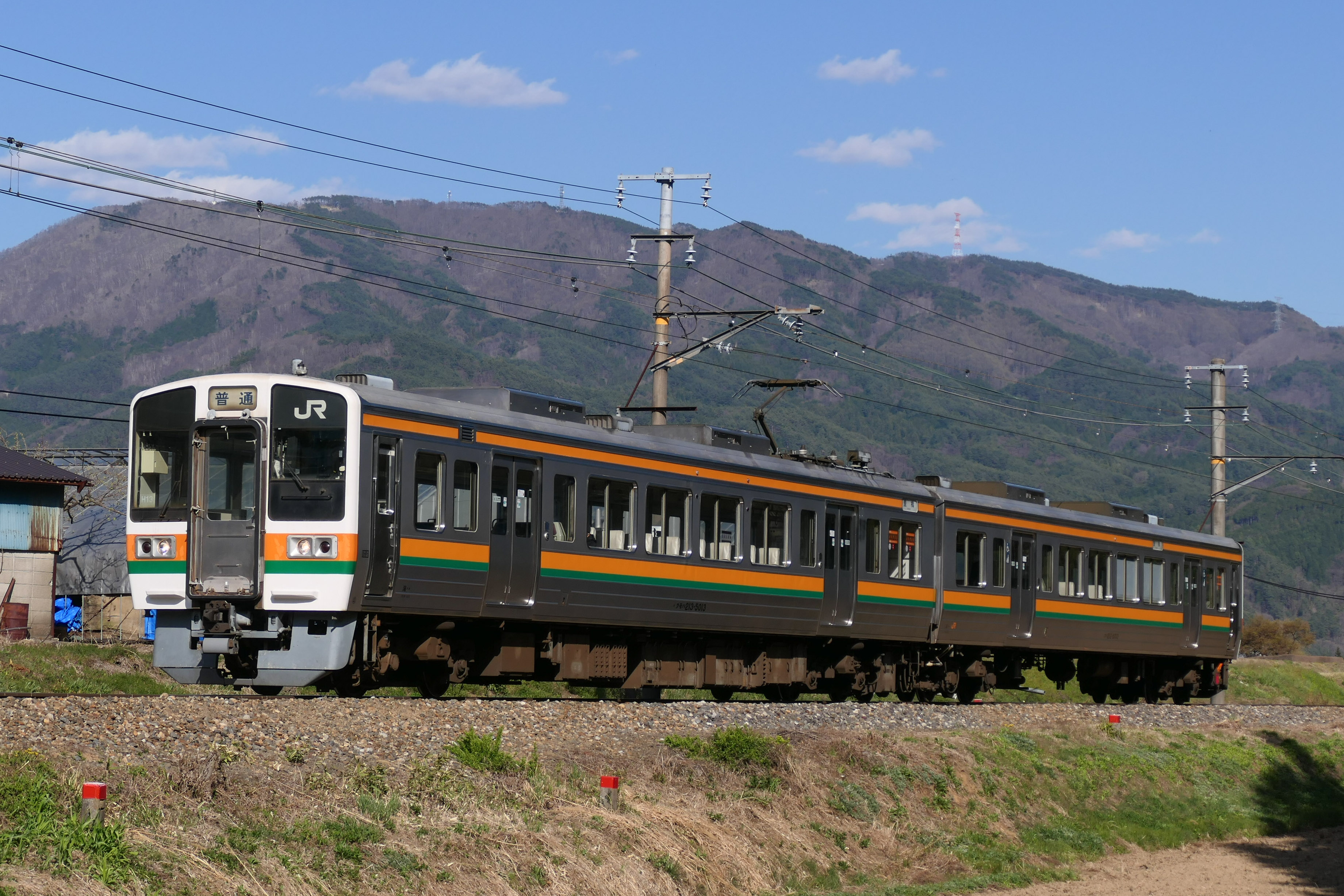
JR Central 213-5000 series

==== 2-car sets ====
Car No.	1	2
Designation	T'c	Mc
Numbering	KuHa 213-5000	KuMoHa 213-5000
Capacity Total/Seated	133/50	133/54

== La Malle de Bois tourist train ==
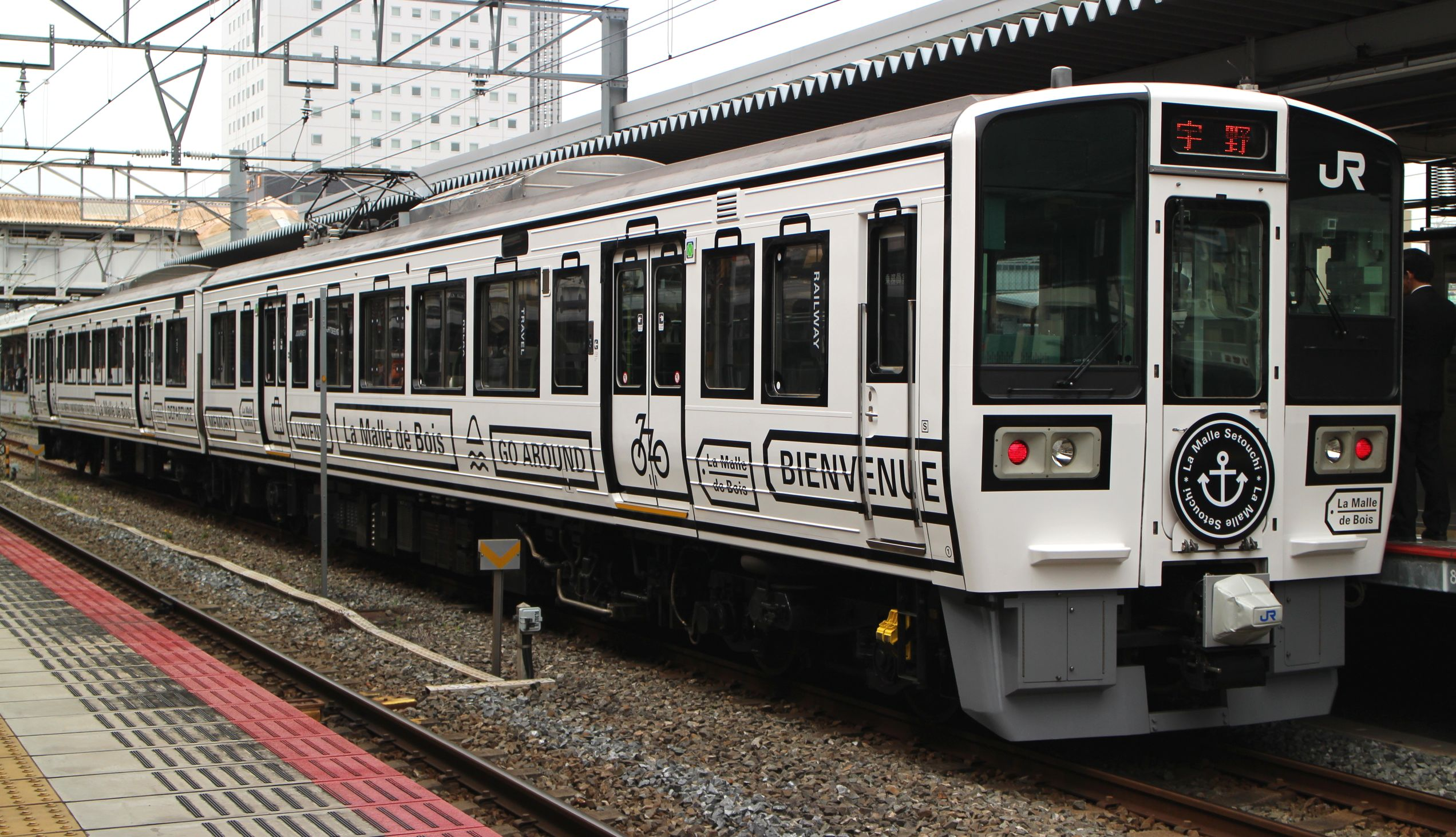
The 213-7000 series La Malle de Bois tourist train in April 2016

From spring 2016, a 213 series two-car set was modified to operate on sightseeing services in the Okayama area. The train is modified with bicycle spaces and seat approximately 52 passengers.

The train is formed as follows.

Car No.	1	2
Numbering	KuRo 212-7004	KuMoRo 213-7004
Capacity	25	26

== Toyama Chihō Railway ==
Toyama Chihō Railway purchased 213 series 2-car (4 sets) from Central Japan Railway. And, Toyama Chihō Railway plans to commence operation of 213 series since 2027.
