= 315 series =

Japanese train type

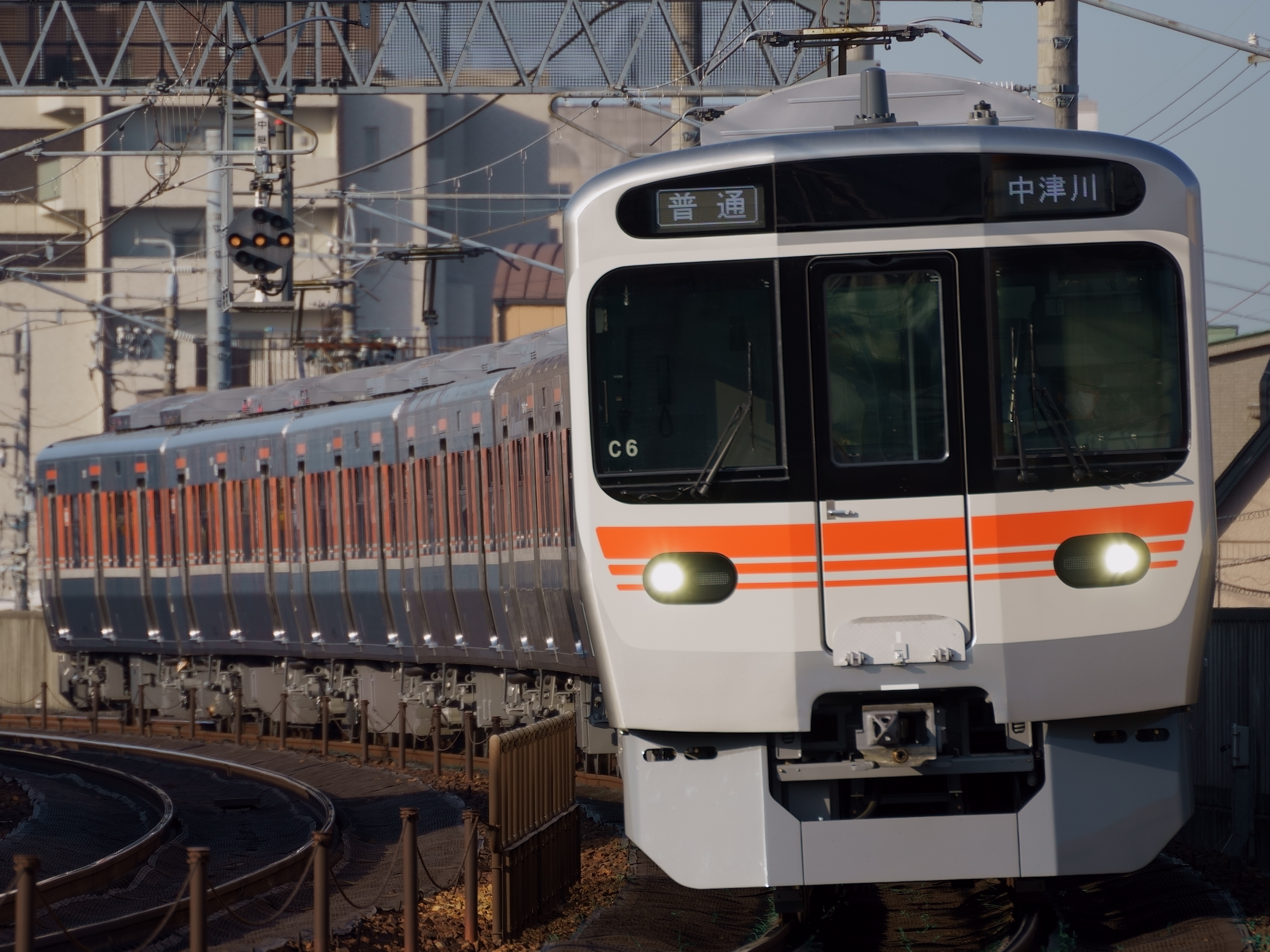
- A 315 series train in March 2022
- In service: 5 March 2022 – present
- Manufacturer: Nippon Sharyo
- Family name: N-QUALIS
- Replaced: 211 series, 213 series, 311 series
- Constructed: 2021–2025
- Number built: 352 vehicles; 23 × 8-car; 42 × 4-car
- Formation: 4/8 cars per set
- Fleet numbers: C1–C23 (8-car Jinryō-based sets); C101–C126 (4-car Jinryō-based sets); U1–U16 (4-car Shizuoka-based sets)
- Operator: JR Central
- Depots: Jinryō, Shizuoka
- Lines served: Tōkaidō Main Line; Chūō Main Line; Kansai Main Line; Taketoyo Line

Specifications
- Car body construction: Stainless steel
- Car length: 20,100 mm (65 ft 11 in)
- Width: 2,978 mm (9 ft 9.2 in)
- Doors: 3 pairs per side
- Maximum speed: 130 km/h (81 mph)
- Traction system: Variable frequency (SiC)
- Electric system: 1,500 V DC overhead catenary
- Current collection: Pantograph
- Multiple working: 313 series
- Track gauge: 1,067 mm (3 ft 6 in)

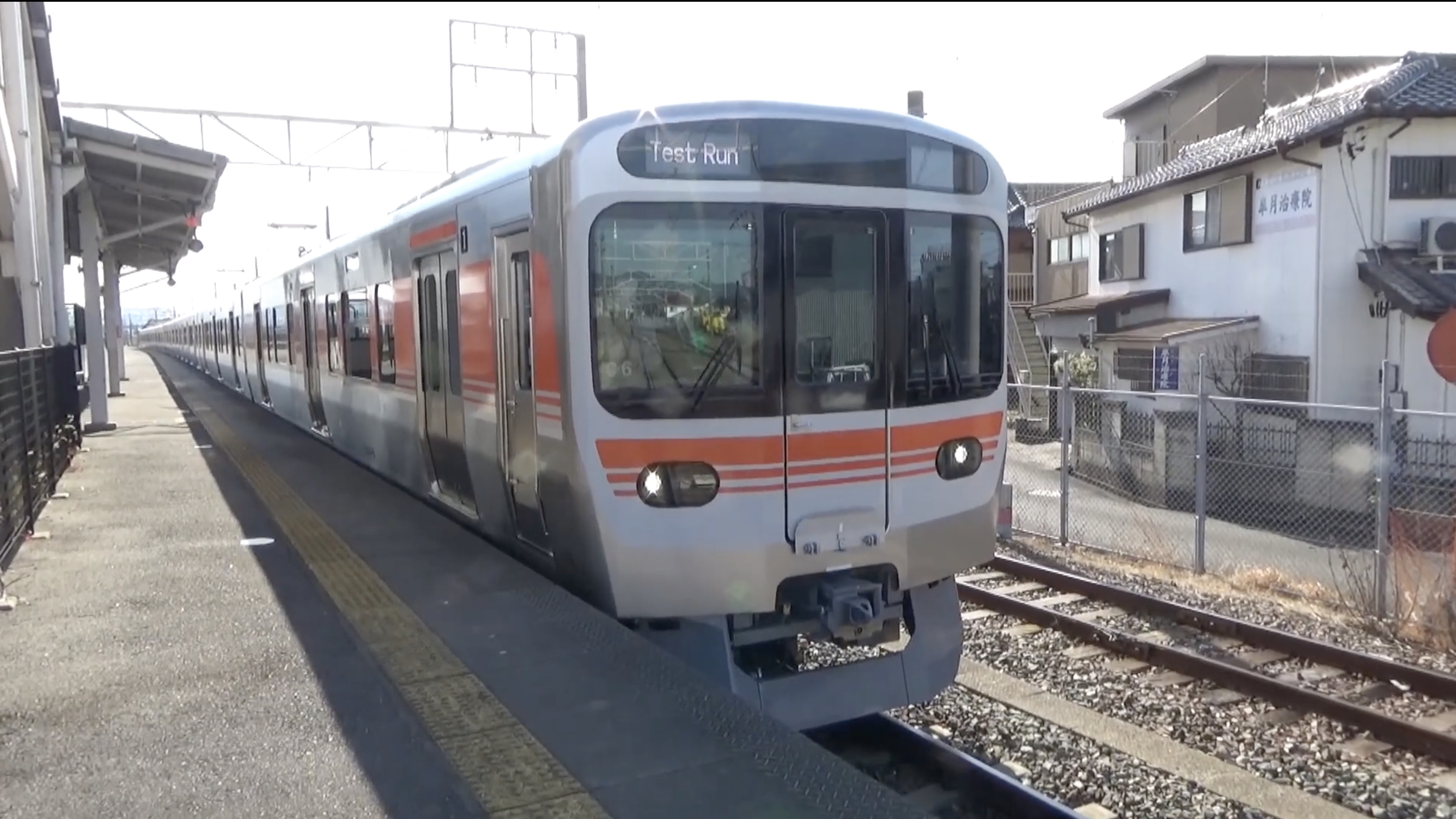
Set C6 on a test run on Tōkaidō Main Line, February 2022

The 315 series (315系, 315-kei) is a commuter electric multiple unit (EMU) train type introduced by Central Japan Railway Company (JR Central) in the Nagoya and Shizuoka areas on 5 March 2022.

== Background ==
JR Central has ordered 352 cars as a replacement for the 211, 213, and 311 series trains operating since the late 1980s. All trains have been manufactured by Nippon Sharyo, and are the first trains to have the N-QUALIS brand.

== Fleet details ==
The fleet consists of 42 four-car sets (C101–C126, U1–U16) and 23 eight-car sets (C1–C23). For sets based at Jinryō depot, the eight-car sets are numbered from C1 onwards while the four-car 315-3000 series sets are numbered from C101 onwards. Four-car 315-3000 series sets based at Shizuoka depot are numbered from U1 onwards.

== Operations ==
Eight-car sets are used on the Chūō Main Line between Nagoya and Nakatsugawa. Four-car sets based at Jinryō depot are used on the Kansai Main Line between Nagoya and Kameyama since 1 June 2023, as well as on the Tōkaidō Main and Taketoyo lines in the Nagoya area since 15 March 2024. Four-car sets will be used on the Shizuoka section of the Tōkaido Main Line from 1 June 2024.

== Formations ==
Eight-car sets are formed as follows.

8-car sets C1–C23
Designation	KuHa 315-0 (Tc1)	MoHa 315-0 (M1)	MoHa 315-500 (M2)	SaHa 315-0 (T1)	SaHa 315-500 (T2)	MoHa 315-0 (M1)	MoHa 315-500 (M2)	KuHa 314-0 (Tc'1)
Weight (t)	33.9	37	34.9	30.4	31	37	34.9	34.5
Capacity (total)	139	154						133

== Interior ==
The design concept of the interior is "a comfortable moving space with a gentle and secure feeling."

Passenger accommodation consists of longitudinal seating throughout; each seat has a per-occupant width of 46 centimetres (18 in), a 1 cm (0.39 in) increase over those of the 211 series. Wheelchair spaces are provided in every car. Also featured are LCD passenger information displays and security cameras. Priority seating areas use a different floor design and color scheme to distinguish them from general-use seating.

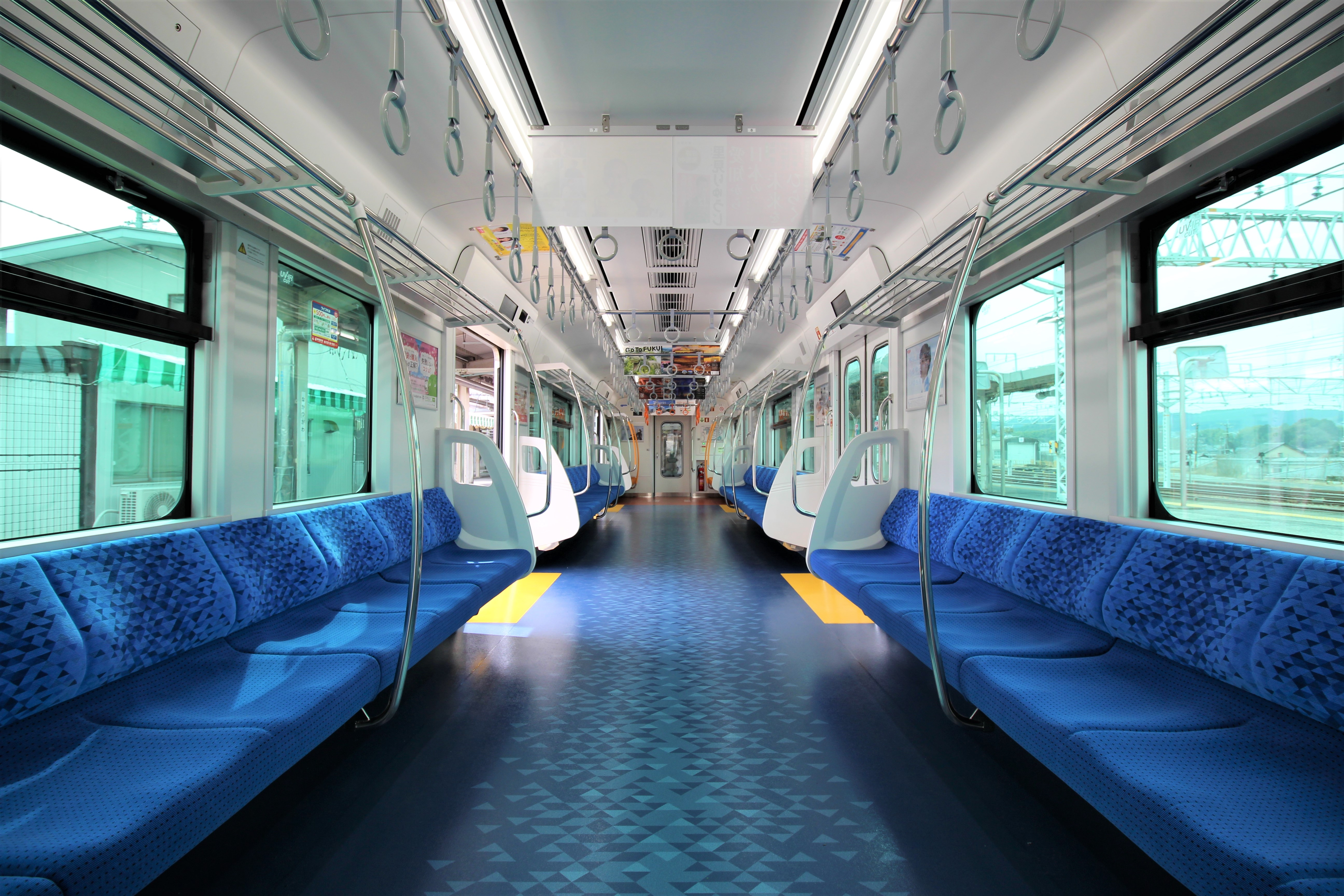
Interior view

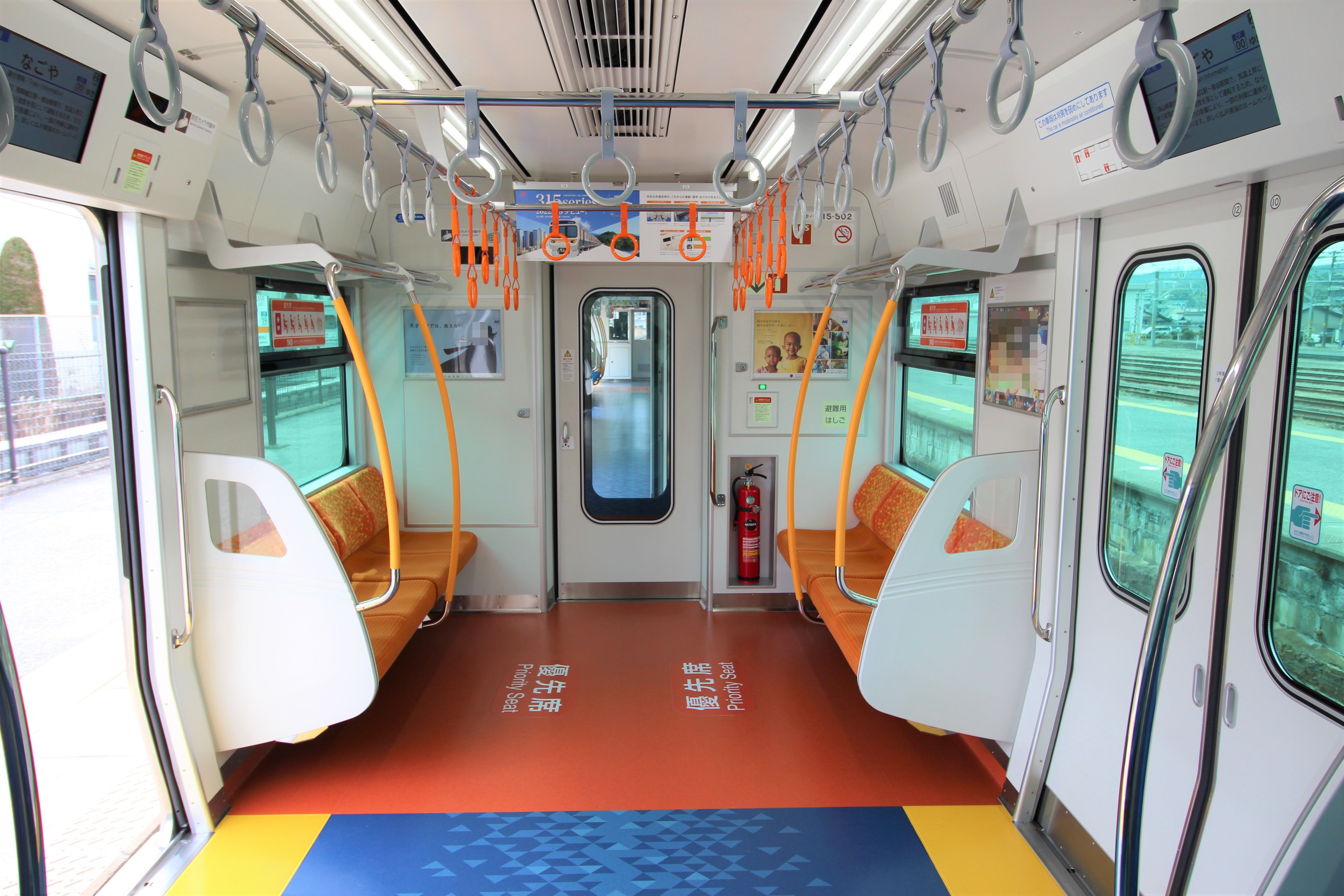
Priority seating

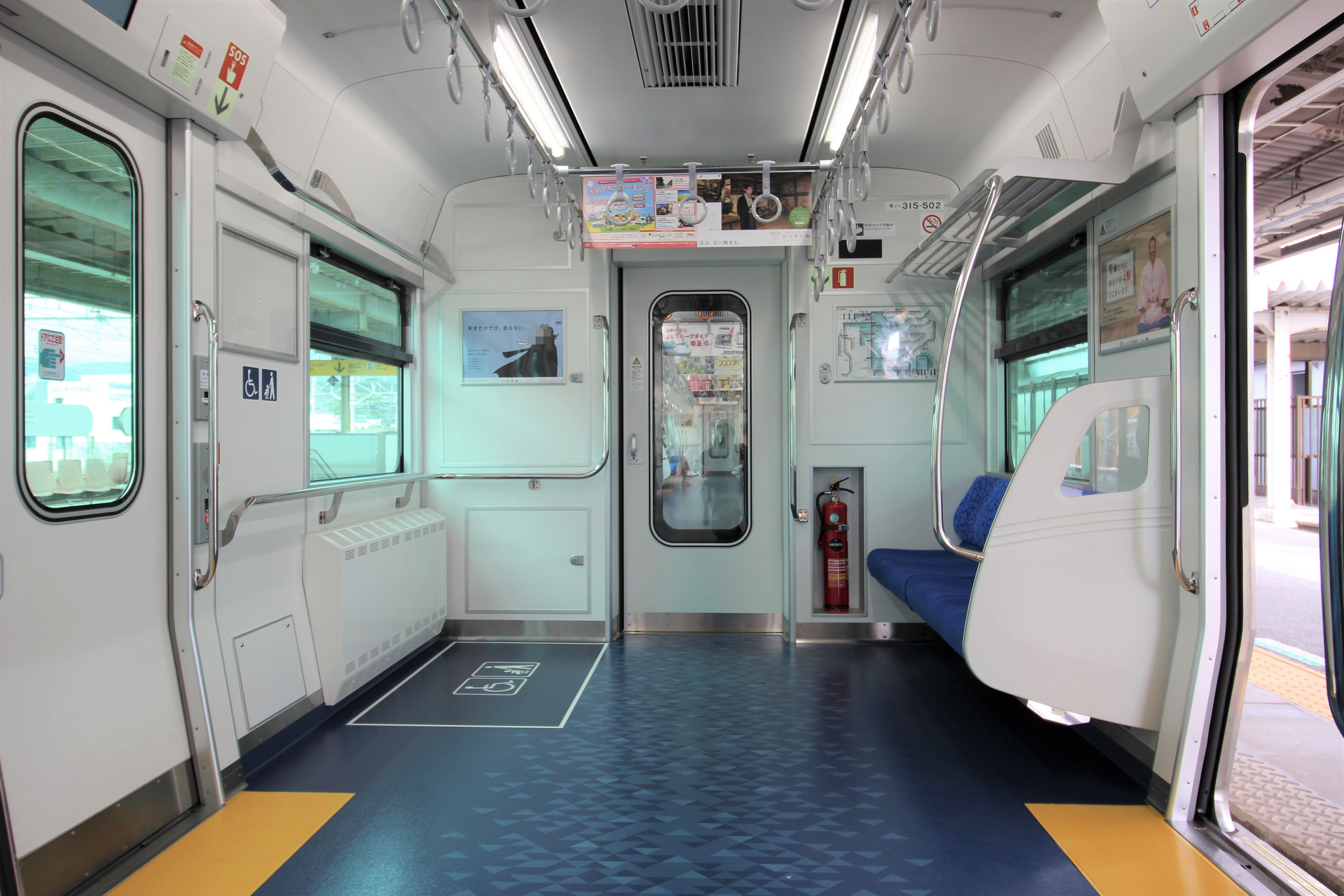
Wheelchair space

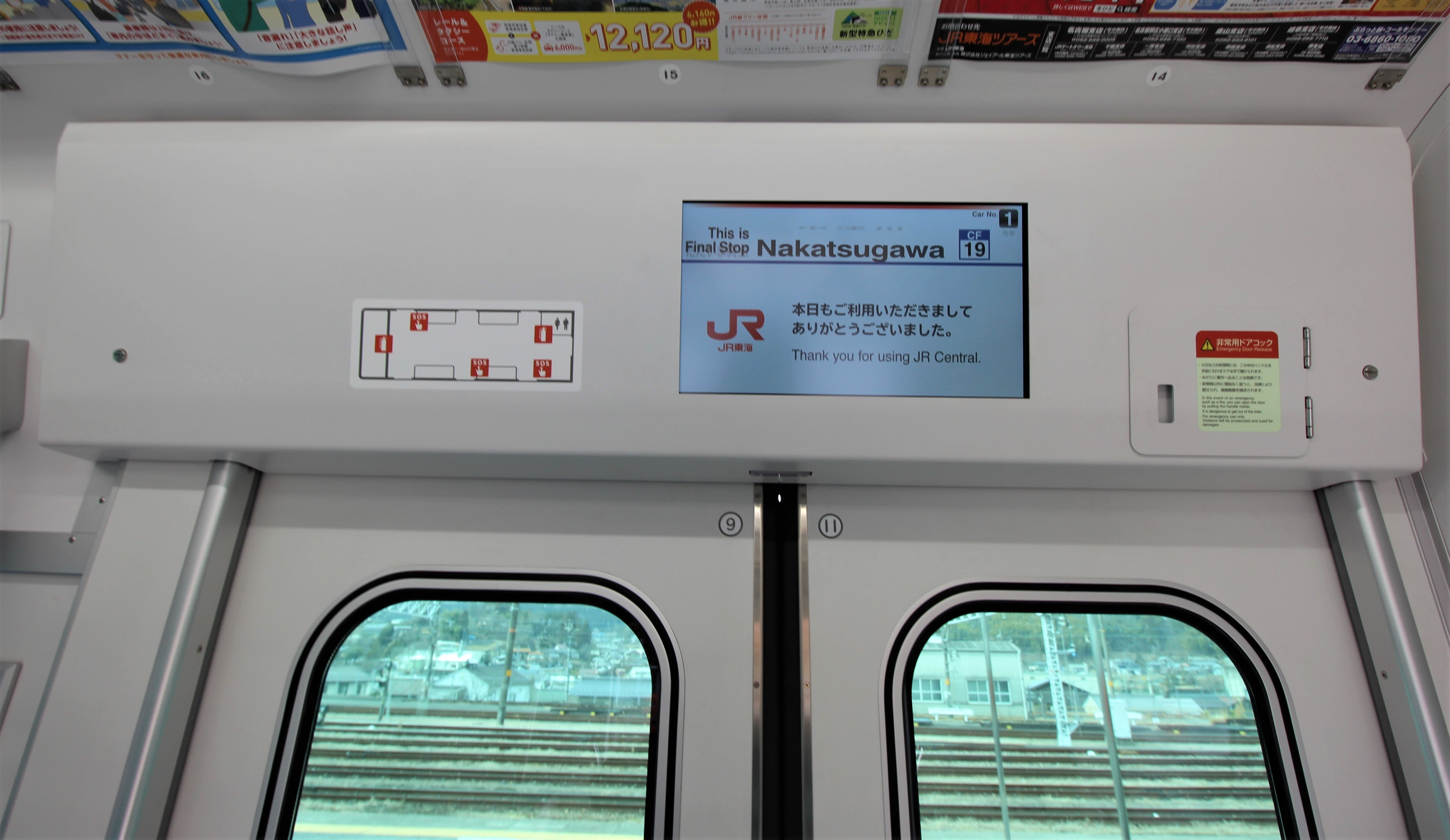
Passenger information display

== History ==
The fleet was first introduced into service on 5 March 2022, with eight-car sets C2 and C6 being the first to enter service.

Sets from C8 onwards are designated for fleet expansion. This set also has modified cowcatchers at the end cars compared to the previous existing 8-car sets (of which there are seven).

The first two four-car sets, C101 and C102, were delivered in December 2022. As of 21 September 2023, all 23 eight-car sets have been delivered with the appearance of set C23.

The first two four-car sets for the Shizuoka area, U1 and U2, were delivered in May 2024. These sets feature semi-automatic doors whereby passenger-operated door buttons are positioned next to the train doors. From July 2025, the trains entered service on the section of the Tōkaidō Main Line between Ōbu Station and Toyohashi Station.

By November 2025, the entire four-car fleet was delivered.
