= 311 series =

Japanese train type

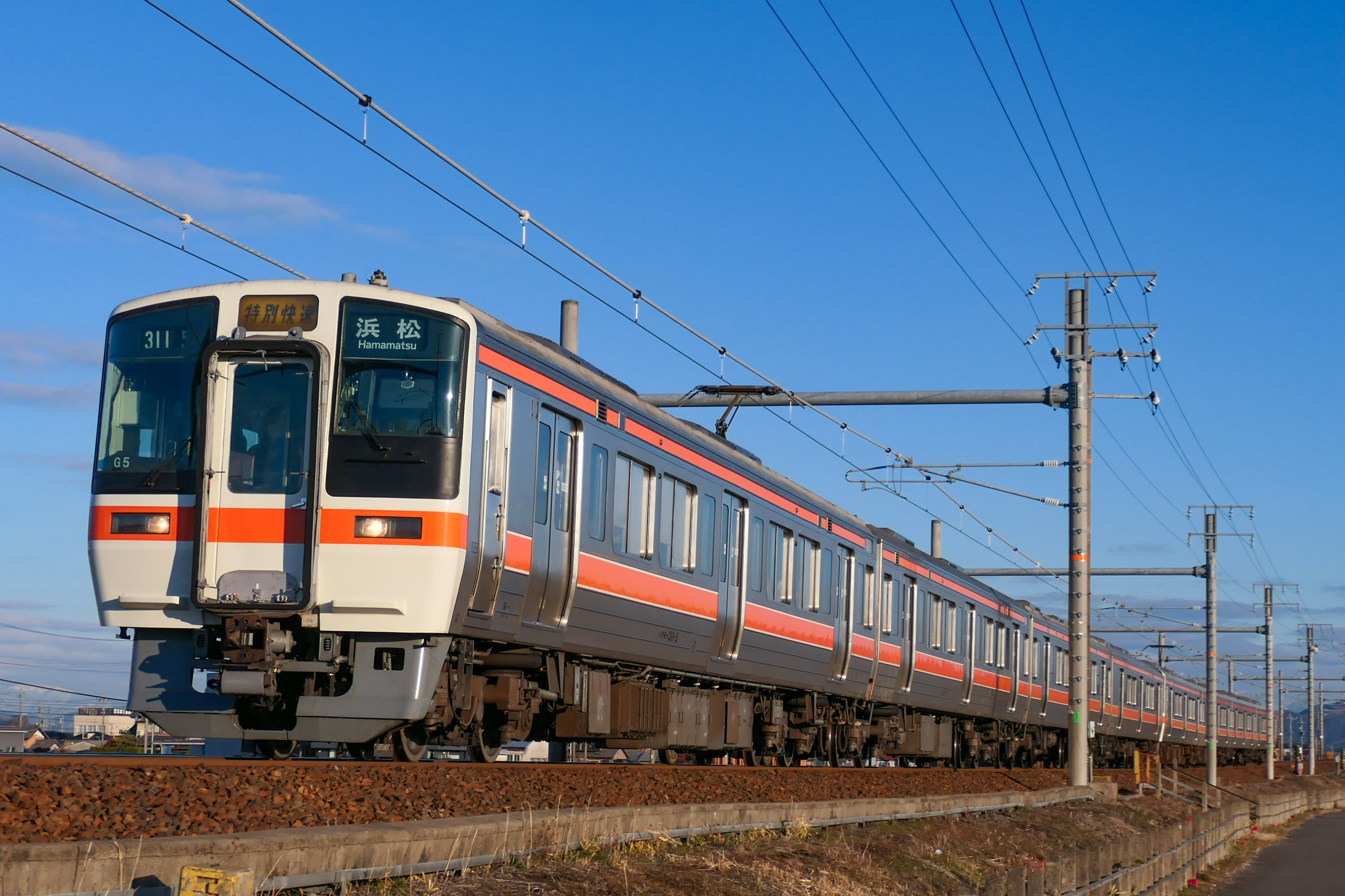
- 311 series, January 2022
- In service: 1989–2025
- Manufacturers: Hitachi, Kawasaki Heavy Industries, Kinki Sharyo
- Replaced: 113 series, 115 series
- Constructed: 1989–1991
- Scrapped: 2022–
- Number built: 60 vehicles
- Number in service: None
- Successor: 315 series
- Formation: 4 cars per trainset
- Fleet numbers: G1–G15
- Operator: JR Central
- Depot: Ōgaki
- Lines served: Tōkaidō Main Line; Taketoyo Line

Specifications
- Car body construction: Stainless steel
- Car length: 20,100 mm (65 ft 11 in) (end cars); 20,000 mm (65 ft 7 in) (intermediate cars)
- Width: 2,966 mm (9 ft 8.8 in)
- Doors: 3 pairs per side
- Maximum speed: 120 km/h (75 mph)
- Traction system: Resistor control + field system superimposed field excitation control
- Traction motors: C-MT61A
- Power output: 960kW (2M2T set configuration)
- Gear ratio: 16:83 (5.19)
- Electric system: 1,500 V DC overhead
- Current collection: C-PS27A single-arm pantograph
- Braking systems: Regenerative brake, electronically controlled pneumatic brakes
- Safety systems: ATS-ST, ATS-PT
- Coupling system: Shibata Type
- Multiple working: 211/313 series
- Track gauge: 1,067 mm (3 ft 6 in)

The 311 series (311系) was a DC suburban electric multiple unit (EMU) train type operated by Central Japan Railway Company (JR Central) in Japan from 1989 until 2025. A total of 15 four-car sets were built between 1989 and 1991 by Hitachi, Kawasaki Heavy Industries, and Kinki Sharyo to replace older 113 and 115 series EMUs. The design of the 311 series was developed from that of the 211 series.

Following the introduction of new 315 series EMUs, JR Central began retiring the 311 series fleet in May 2022, with the entire fleet retired by 30 June 2025.

== Design ==
Built jointly by Hitachi, Kawasaki Heavy Industries, and Kinki Sharyo, the design was developed from the earlier 211 series, with the first five trains introduced from July 1989 to replace older 113 and 115 series EMUs. Eight more sets were introduced from the start of the new timetable in March 1990, and a further two sets were introduced in March 1991.

== Formation ==
As of 1 October 2015, the fleet consists of 15 four-car sets (G1 to G15), all based at Ogaki Depot. The trainsets are formed as shown below with two motored cars and two non-powered trailer cars.

Designation	Mc	M'	T	Tc'
Numbering	KuMoHa 311	MoHa 311	SaHa 311	KuHa 310

The KuMoHa 311 car is fitted with a single-arm pantograph. Between June 2006 and July 2008, all sets had their original lozenge pantographs replaced with single-arm pantographs.

== Interior ==
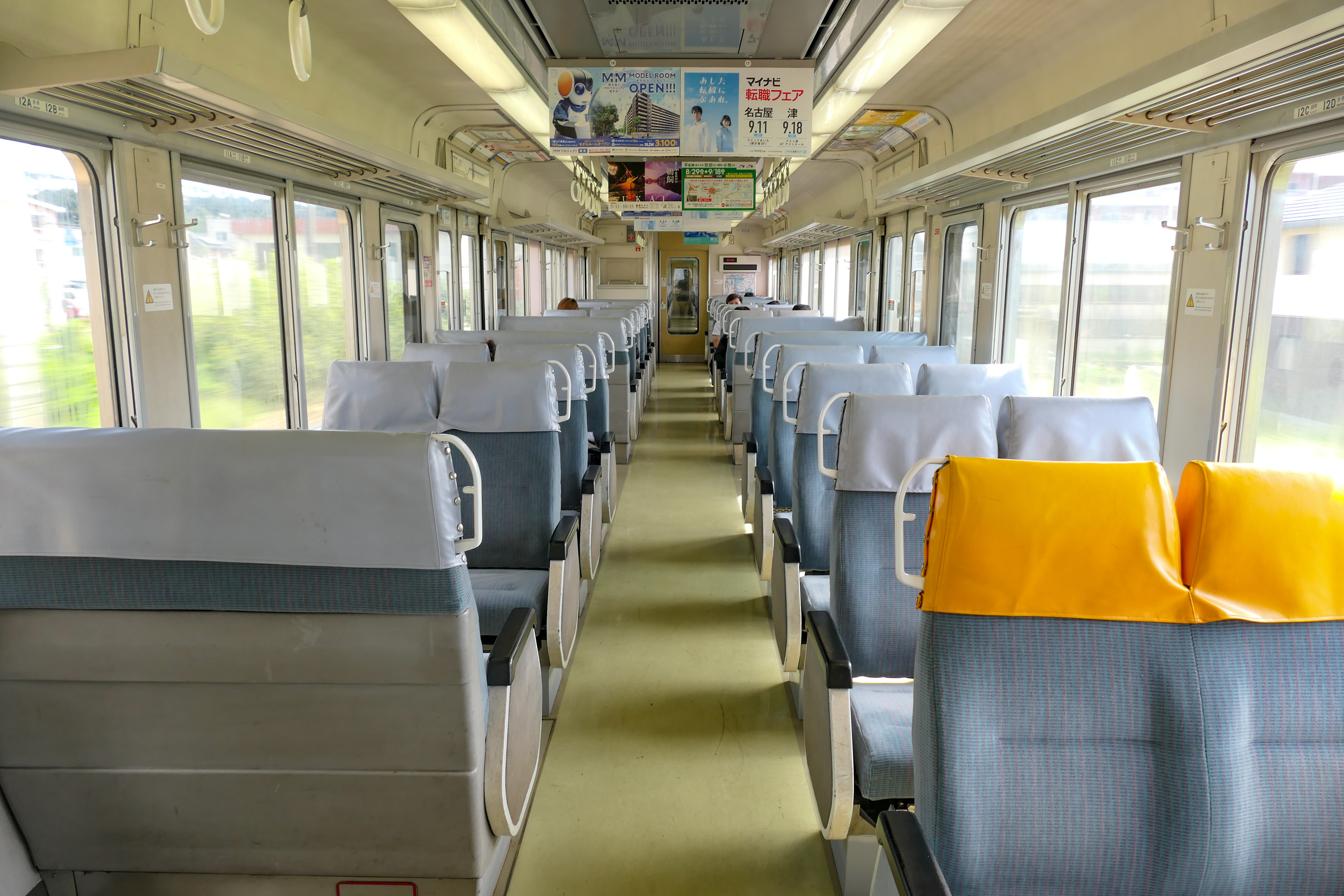
Interior view

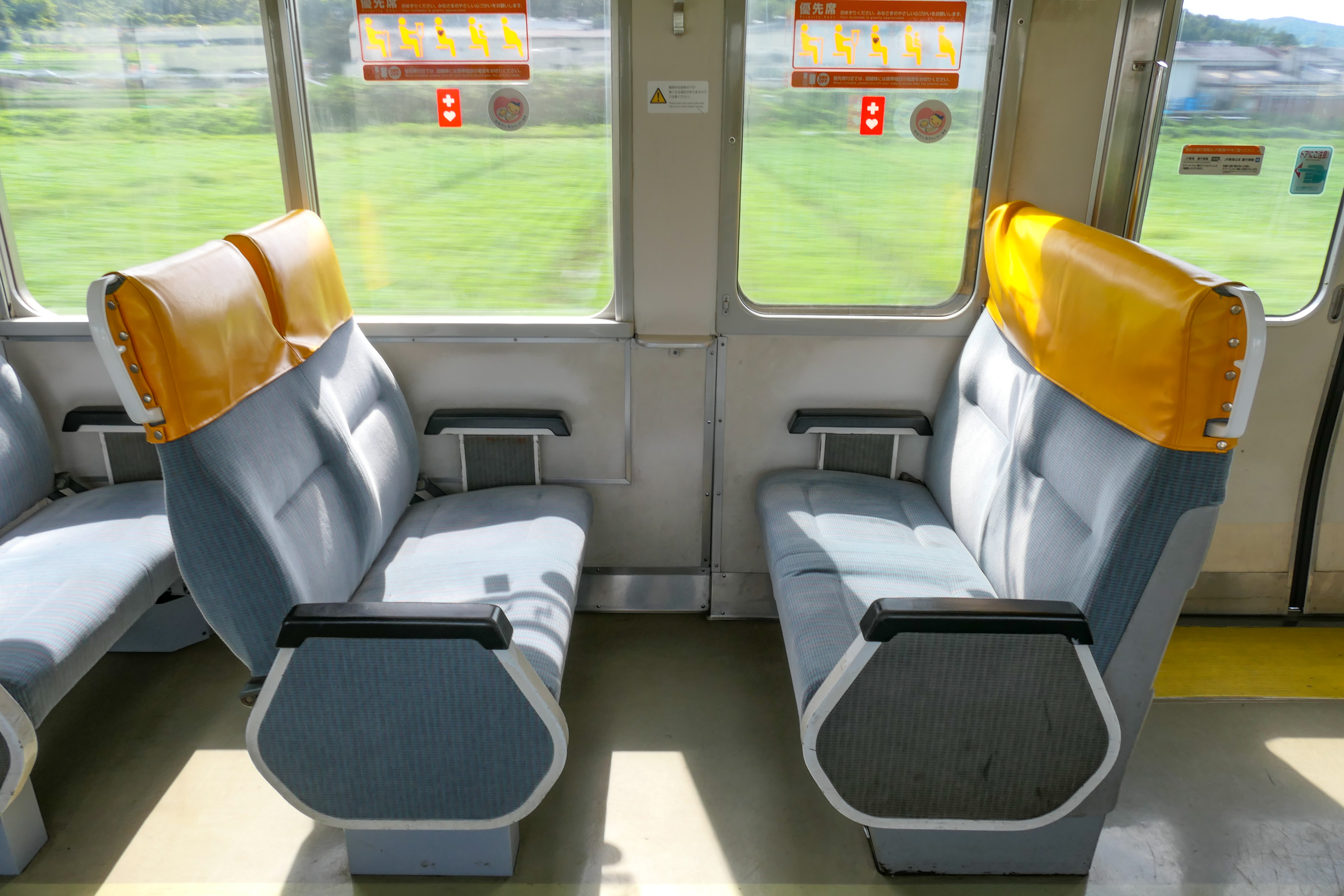
Priority seating

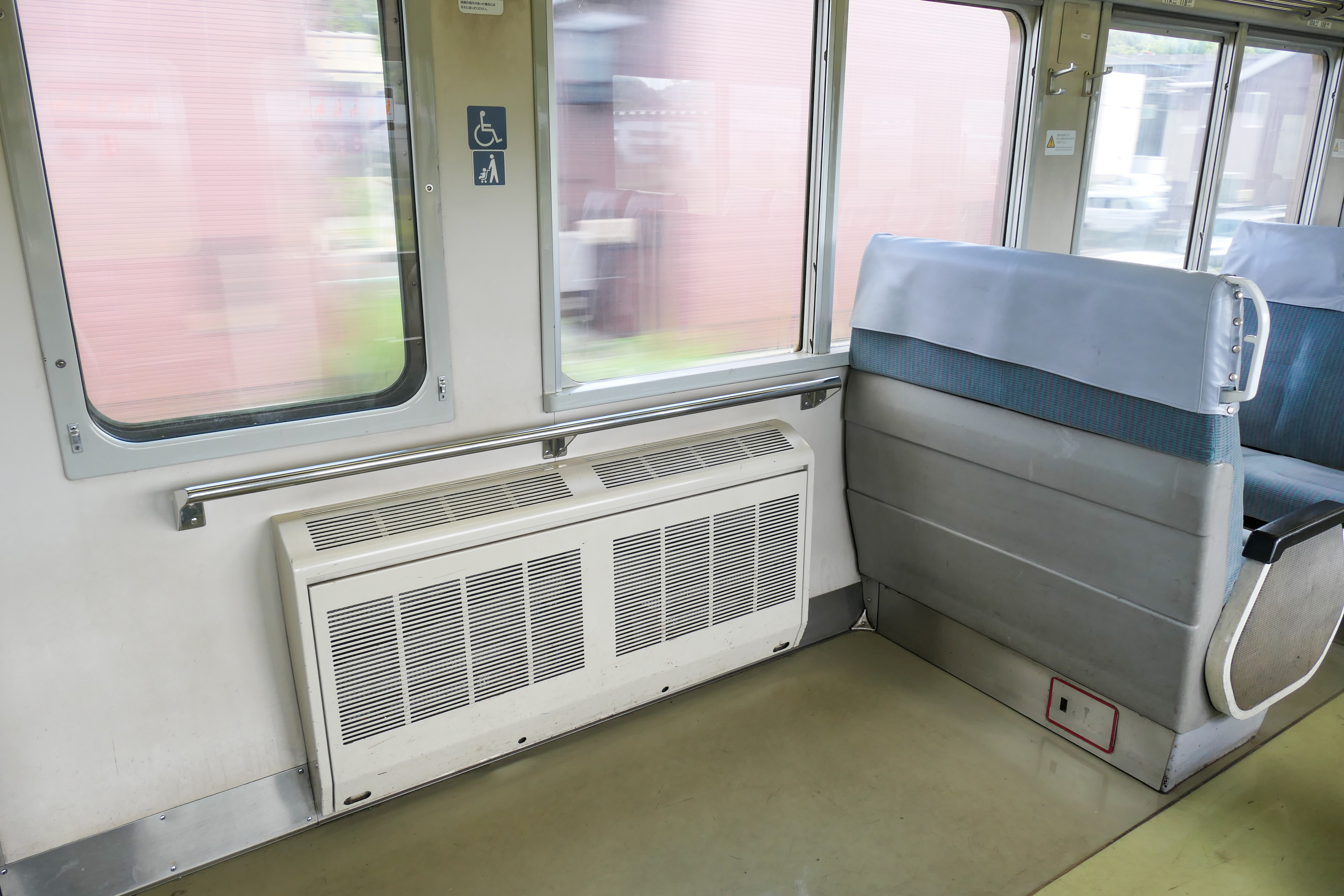
Wheelchair and stroller space

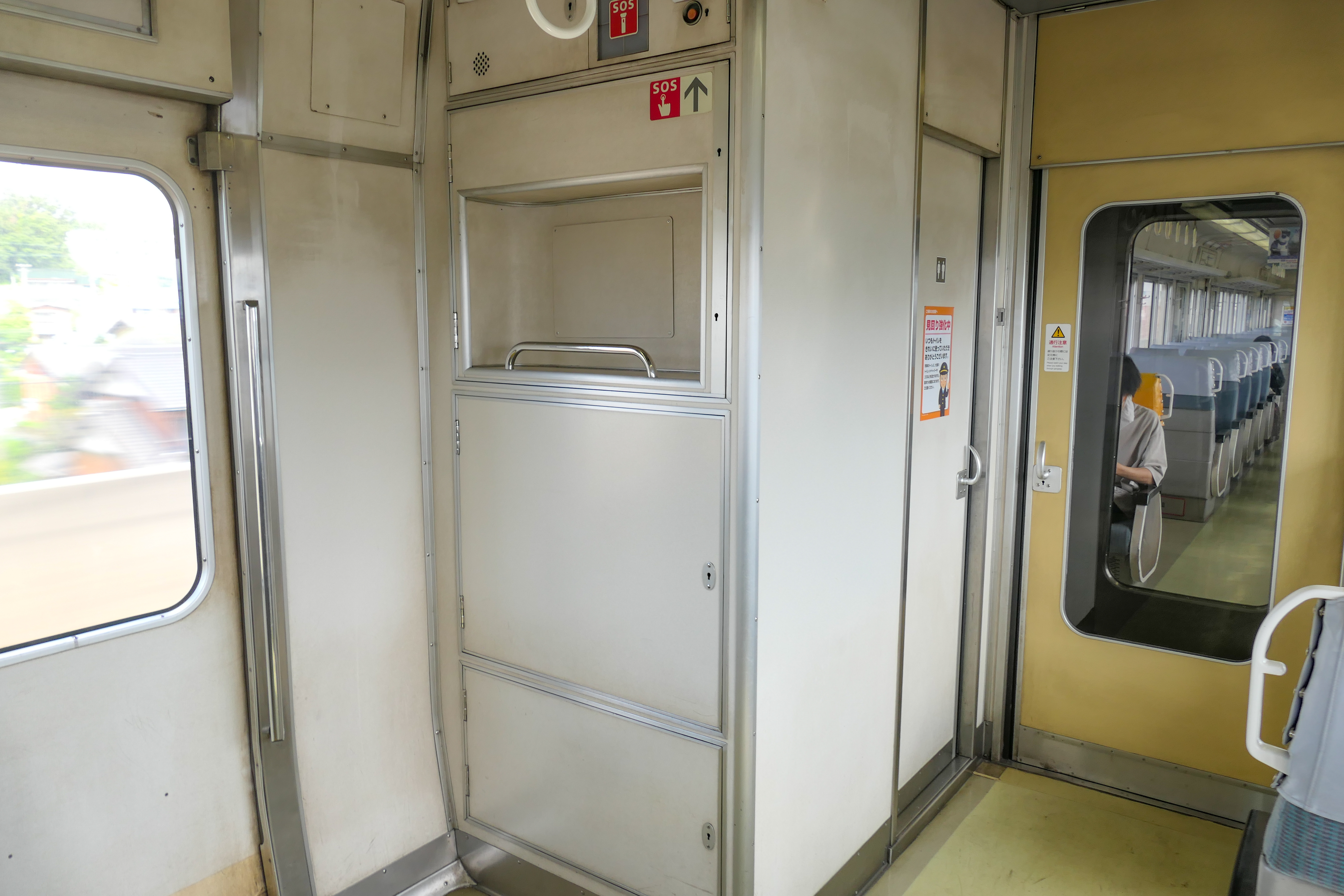
Toilet

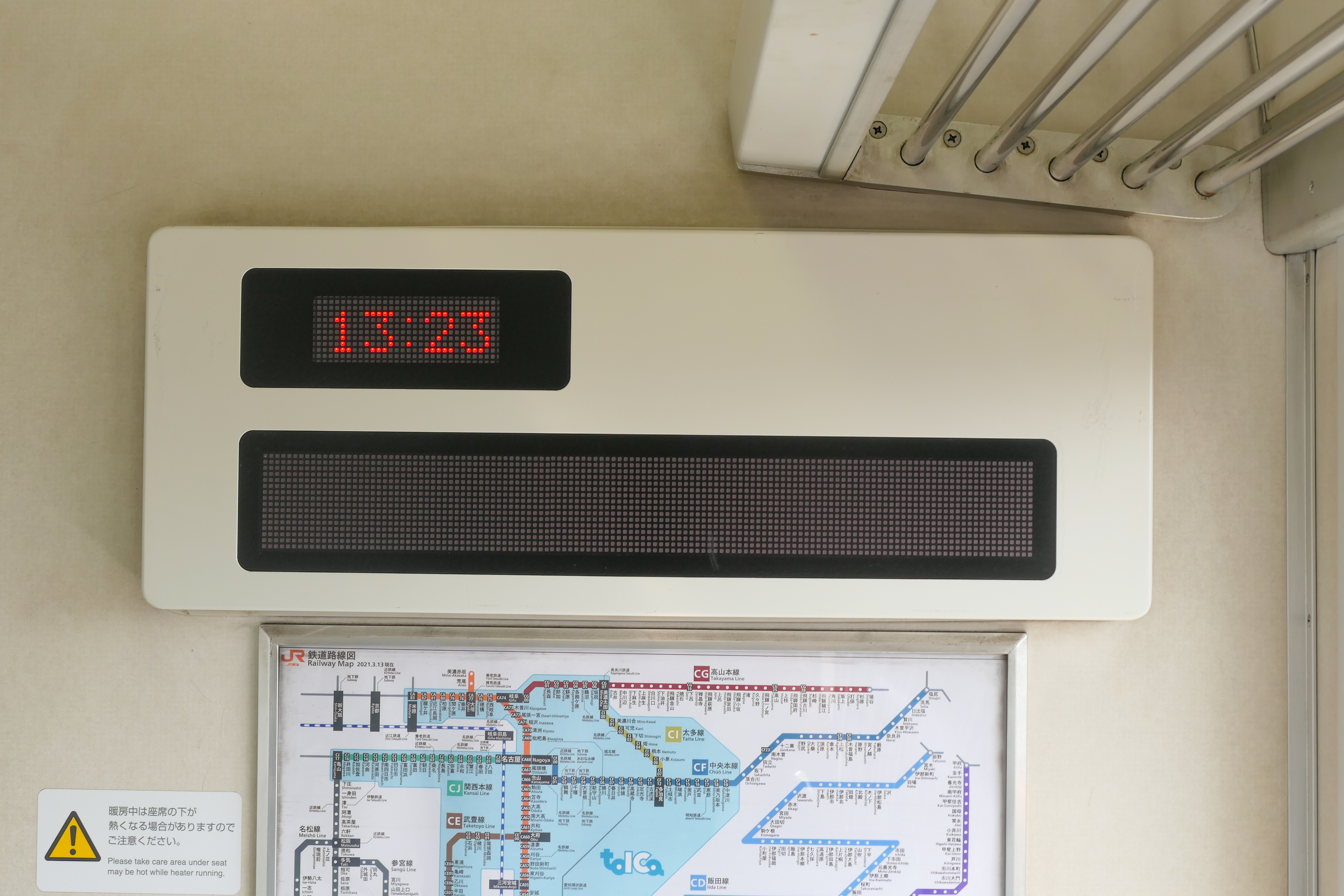
Digital clock and LED passenger information screen

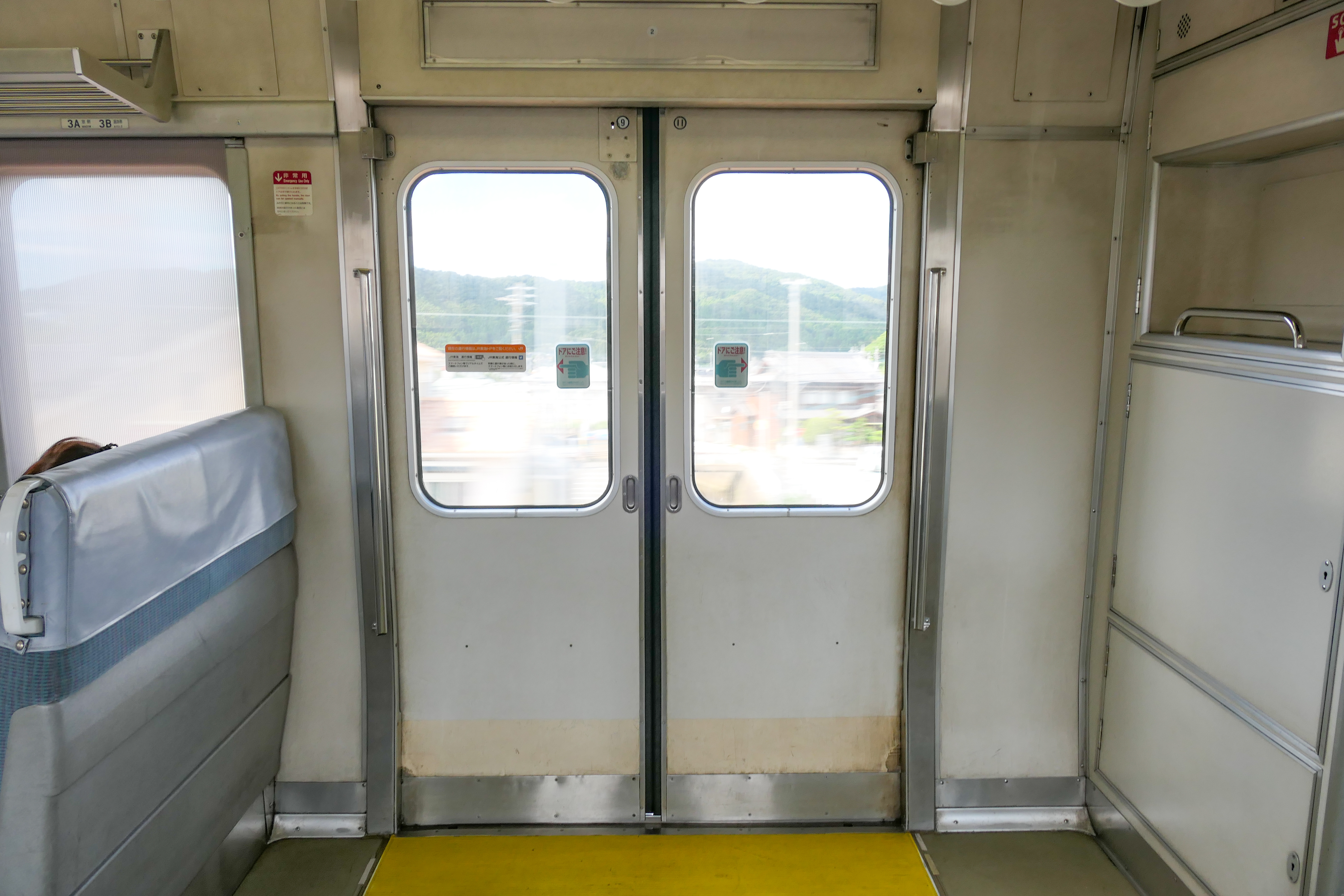
Door view

== Withdrawal ==
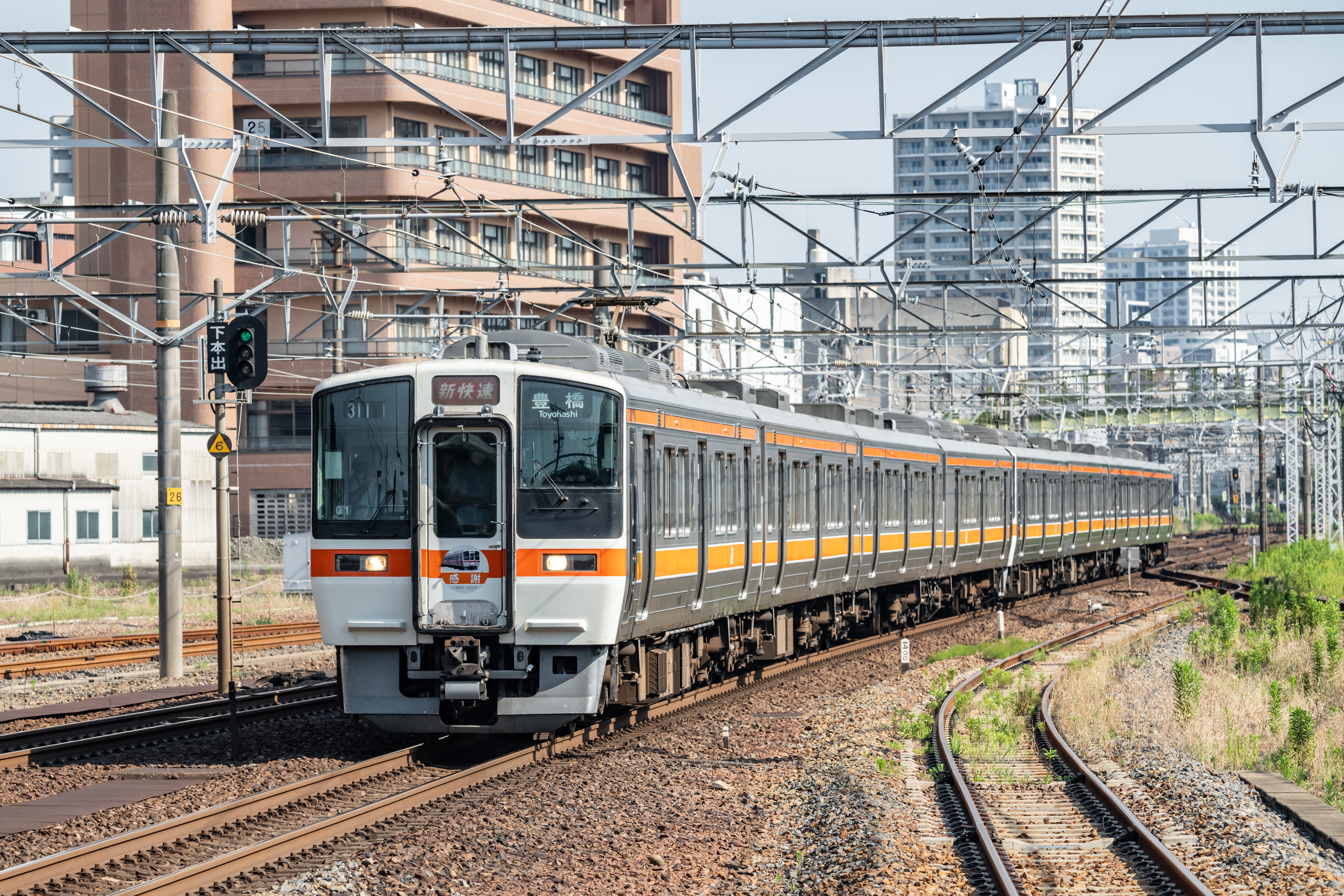
A 311 series train at Atami Station on 30 June 2025, the final day of service.

Withdrawals of the 311 series fleet commenced on 18 May 2022, starting with sets G8 and G12. On 12 May 2025, JR Central announced that the last remaining sets are expected to be withdrawn from service by the end of June and a special tour involving sets G1 and G11 being sent for scrap is scheduled to take place on 12 July of that year.

The 311 series were retired from revenue service on 30 June 2025.
