= 7K =

7K or 7-K may refer to:

- 7000 (number)
- The year 7000, in the 7th millennium
- Gnome-Rhône 7K
- Soyuz 7K-L1
- Soyuz 7K-L1 No.4L
- Soyuz 7K-L1 No.5L
- Soyuz 7K-L3
- Soyuz 7K-OK
- Soyuz 7K-OKS
- Soyuz 7K-T
- Progress 7K-TG
- Soyuz 7K-TM
- A-7K, model of LTV A-7 Corsair II
- 7K, model of Toyota K engine
- 7K, the production code for the 1988 Doctor Who serial Silver Nemesis

== See also ==
- 7000 (disambiguation)
- K7 (disambiguation)
