= 7000 =

7000 may refer to:

- 7000 (number) and the 7000s
- The last year of the 7th millennium, an exceptional common year starting on Wednesday

== See also ==
- 7000 series (disambiguation)
- S7000 (disambiguation)
