= K7 =

K7, K07 or K-7 may refer to:

== Places ==
- K7 (mountain), a mountain of the Karakoram range, in Pakistan
- K-7 (Kansas highway), a state highway in Kansas

=== Fictional locations ===
- Deep Space Station K7, a fictional space station featured in the Star Trek episodes "The Trouble With Tribbles" and "Trials and Tribble-ations"

== People ==
- K7 (musician) (born 1967), American rapper

== Groups, organizations, companies ==
- Kronprinsens husarregemente, a Swedish Army cavalry regiment disbanded 1927
- Studio !K7, German record label

== Products ==
- AMD K7, codename for certain AMD CPUs, including the Athlon, Athlon XP, Duron and some Sempron microprocessors
- Bluebird K7, a high speed hydroplane raced by Donald Campbell
- Daewoo Precision Industries K7, a submachine gun with an integrated suppressor
- Ibanez K7, a series of guitars
- Kalinin K-7, a heavy experimental aircraft designed and tested in the Soviet Union in the early 1930s
- Pentax K-7, a DSLR camera by Hoya Corporation
- Schleicher K7, a 2-seater glider plane made from wood and steel
- Kia K7, a South Korean luxury car

== Submarines ==
- HMS K7, a British submarine of the First World War
- USS K-7 (SS-38), a 1914 United States Navy K-class submarine

== Other uses ==
- A complete graph with 7 Vertices
- Violin Sonata No. 2 (Mozart), by Wolfgang Amadeus Mozart

== See also ==
- 7K (disambiguation)
