= 7000 series =

7000 series may refer to:

== Japanese trains ==
- Chichibu Railway 7000 series electric multiple unit (EMU)
- Echizen Railway 7000 series EMU
- Hankyu 7000 series EMU
- Hokushin Kyuko Electric Railway 7000 series EMU operating for the Kobe Municipal Subway
- Hokuso 7000 series
- HOT7000 series DMU
- IGR 7000 series EMU
- Iyotetsu 7000 series EMU
- Joshin 7000 series EMU
- JR Shikoku 7000 series
- Keio 7000 series EMU
- Keihan 7000 series EMU
- Kintetsu 7000 series EMU
- Meitetsu 7000 series EMU
- Nagoya Municipal Subway 7000 series EMU
- Nankai 7000 series EMU, operated by Nankai Electric Railway
- Nishitetsu 7000 series EMU
- Odakyu 7000 series LSE EMU
- Semboku 7000 series EMU
- Sotetsu 7000 series EMU
- Sapporo Municipal Subway 7000 series
- Toei 7000 series tramcars operated in Tokyo
- Tokyo Metro 7000 series EMU
- Tokyu 7000 series EMU
- Yurikamome 7000 series

== Korean trains ==
- SMRT 7000 series, operated by Seoul Metropolitan Rapid Transit Corporation

== US trains ==
- Chicago "L" 7000-series
- Washington Metro 7000-Series

== Other ==
- 7000-series highways, a series of highway designations in the Canadian province of Ontario
- Dell Inspiron 7000 series laptop computers
- IBM 7000 series, discrete transistor digital computers in the late 1950s and 1960s
- Navistar 7000 series military vehicles
- Radeon HD 7000 series of AMD graphics processing units
- Radeon RX 7000 series of AMD graphics processing units
