= 119 series =

Japanese DC electric multiple unit train type

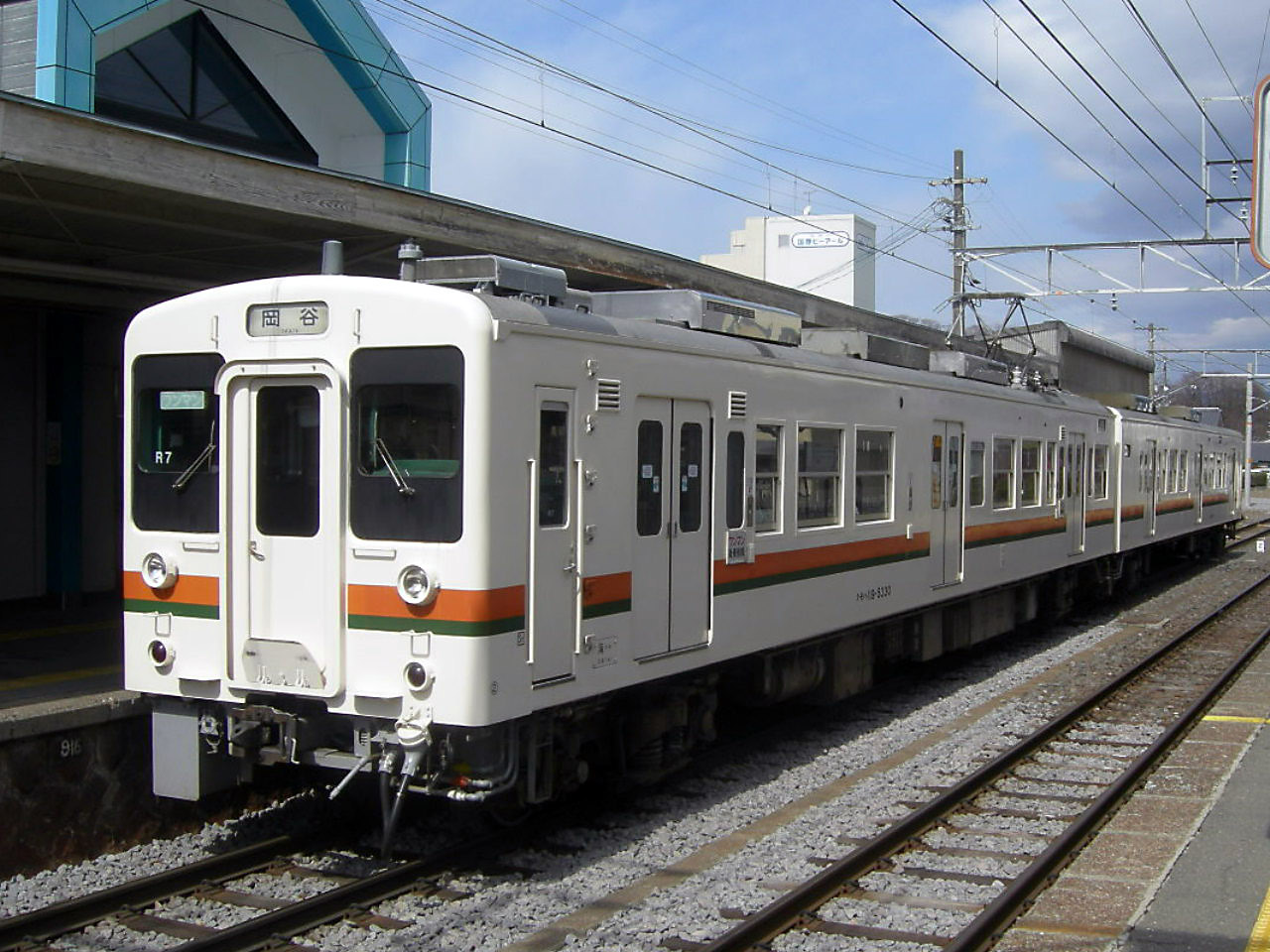
- A 119-5300 series 2-car set in March 2008
- In service: 1983–March 2012
- Manufacturer: Nippon Sharyo
- Constructed: 1982–1983
- Number built: 57 vehicles
- Number in service: None
- Successor: 313 series
- Formation: 1/2 cars per trainset
- Operators: JNR (1983–1987); JR Central (1987–2012)
- Depot: Ōgaki
- Line served: Iida Line

Specifications
- Car body construction: Steel
- Car length: 20,000 mm (65 ft 7 in)
- Width: 2,832 mm (9 ft 3.5 in)
- Height: 3,935 mm (12 ft 10.9 in)
- Doors: 3 pairs per side
- Maximum speed: 100 km/h (60 mph)
- Traction system: Resistor control
- Power output: 440 kW per motor car
- Acceleration: 2.8 km/h/s (single-car units); 1.6 km/h/s (2-car units)
- Electric system: 1,500 V DC
- Current collection: Overhead catenary
- Braking systems: Dynamic brake, electro-pneumatic brake
- Safety system: ATS-ST
- Track gauge: 1,067 mm (3 ft 6 in)

The 119 series (119系) was a DC electric multiple unit (EMU) train type which was operated on local services in Japan by Japanese National Railways (JNR) and later by Central Japan Railway Company (JR Central) between 1983 and March 2012.

== Design ==
The 119 series design was based on the earlier 105 series EMU type, with improvements to cope with the steep gradients and winter climate of the Iida Line.

== Variants ==
- 119‑0 series (Eight two-car sets, E10–17)
- 119‑100 series (single-car sets converted by adding a second driving cab)
- 119‑5000 series (Nine two-car sets, E1–9, converted by adding inverter air-conditioning)
- 119‑5100 series (Nine single-car sets, M1–9, converted from 119‑100 series sets by adding inverter air-conditioning)
- 119‑5300 series (Eight two-car sets, R1–8, converted from 119‑5000 series sets for wanman driver-only operation)

== Formations ==
The sets were formed as follows.

=== 119-0 series 2-car sets E10–17 ===
Designation	Mc	Tc'
Numbering	KuMoHa 119	KuHa 118

The KuMoHa 119 car was fitted with one lozenge-type pantograph.

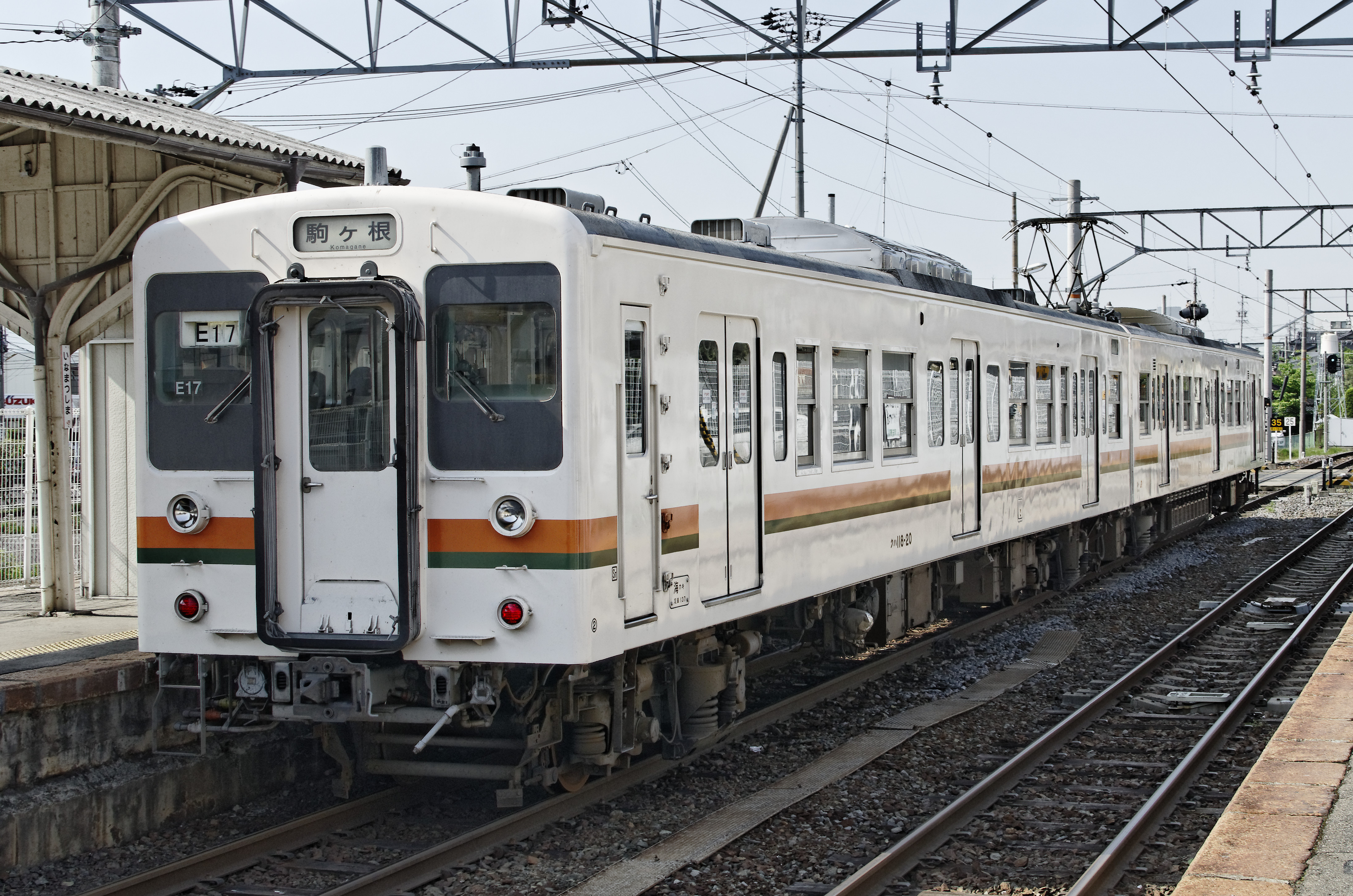
119-0 series set E17 in May 2011

=== 119-100 series single-car sets M1–9 ===
Designation	cMc
Numbering	KuMoHa 119‑100

Each car was fitted with one lozenge-type pantograph.

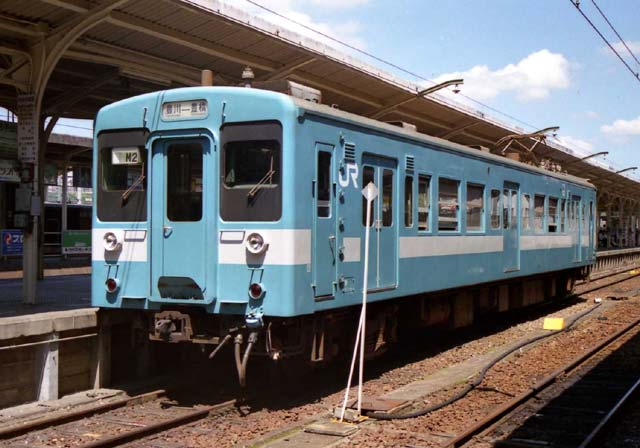
119-100 series set M2 in original blue livery (date unknown)

=== 119-5000 series 2-car sets E1–9 ===
Designation	Mc	Tc'
Numbering	KuMoHa 119‑5000	KuHa 118‑5000

The KuMoHa 119 car was fitted with one lozenge-type pantograph.

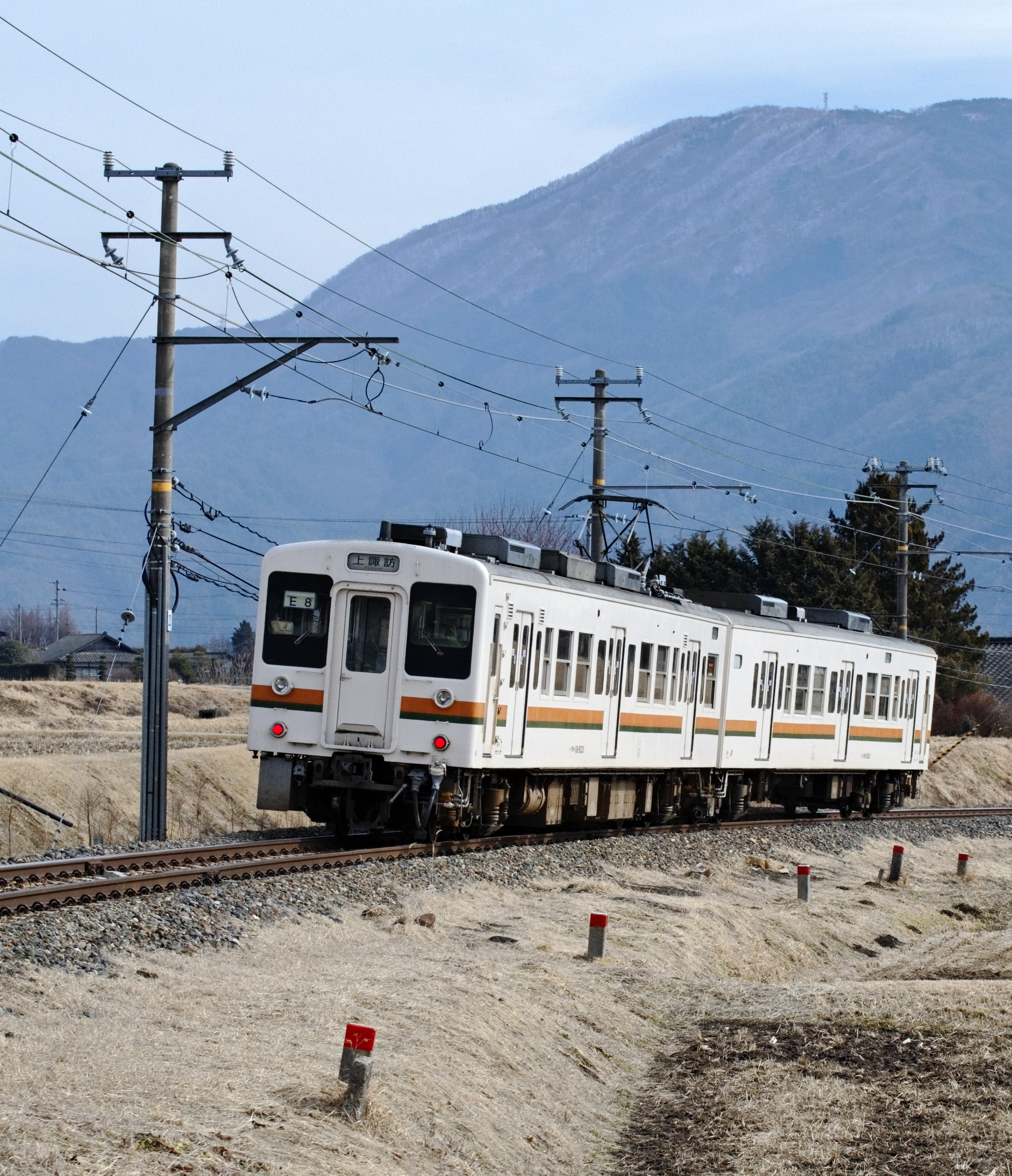
119-5000 series set E8 in February 2011

=== 119-5100 series single-car sets M1–9 ===
Designation	cMc
Numbering	KuMoHa 119‑5100

Each car was fitted with one lozenge-type pantograph.

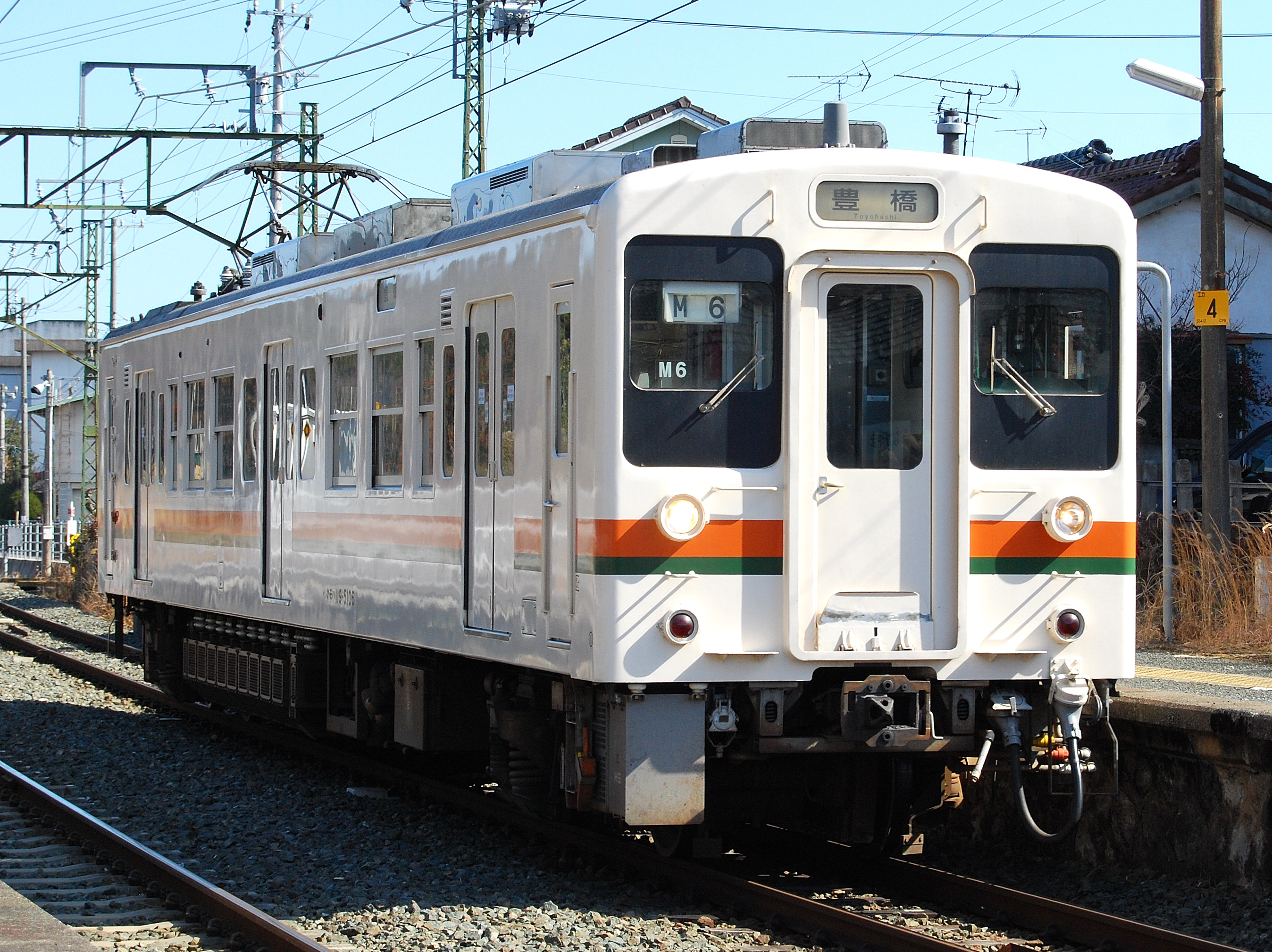
119-5100 series set M6 in February 2012

=== 119-5300 series 2-car sets R1–8 ===
Designation	Mc	Tc'
Numbering	KuMoHa 119‑5300	KuHa 118‑5300

The KuMoHa 119 car was fitted with one lozenge-type pantograph.

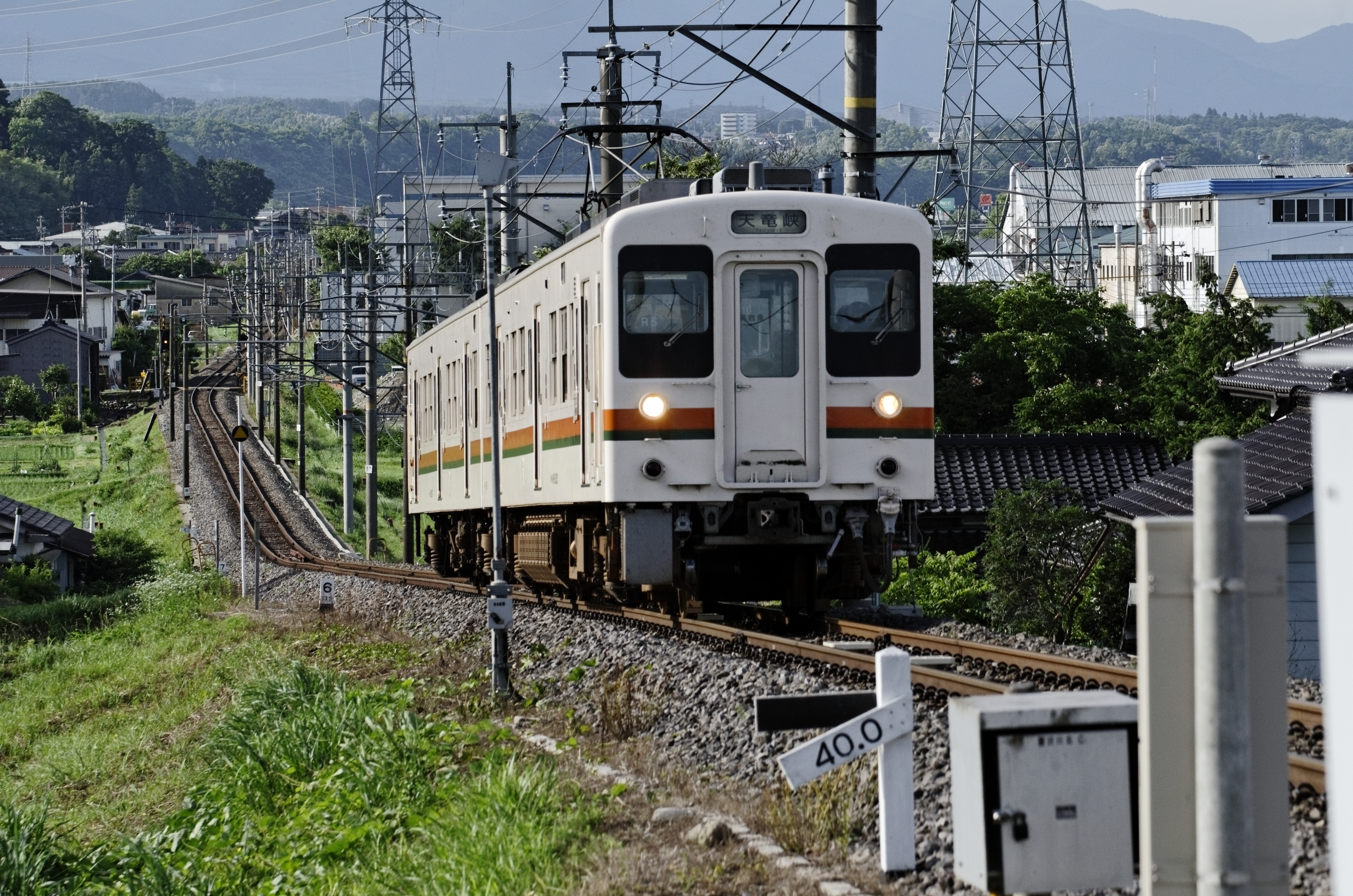
119-5300 series set R5 in June 2011

== Interior ==
Passenger accommodation consisted of a mixture of longitudinal bench seating and transverse four-seat bays. The KuHa 118 cars were equipped with a toilet.

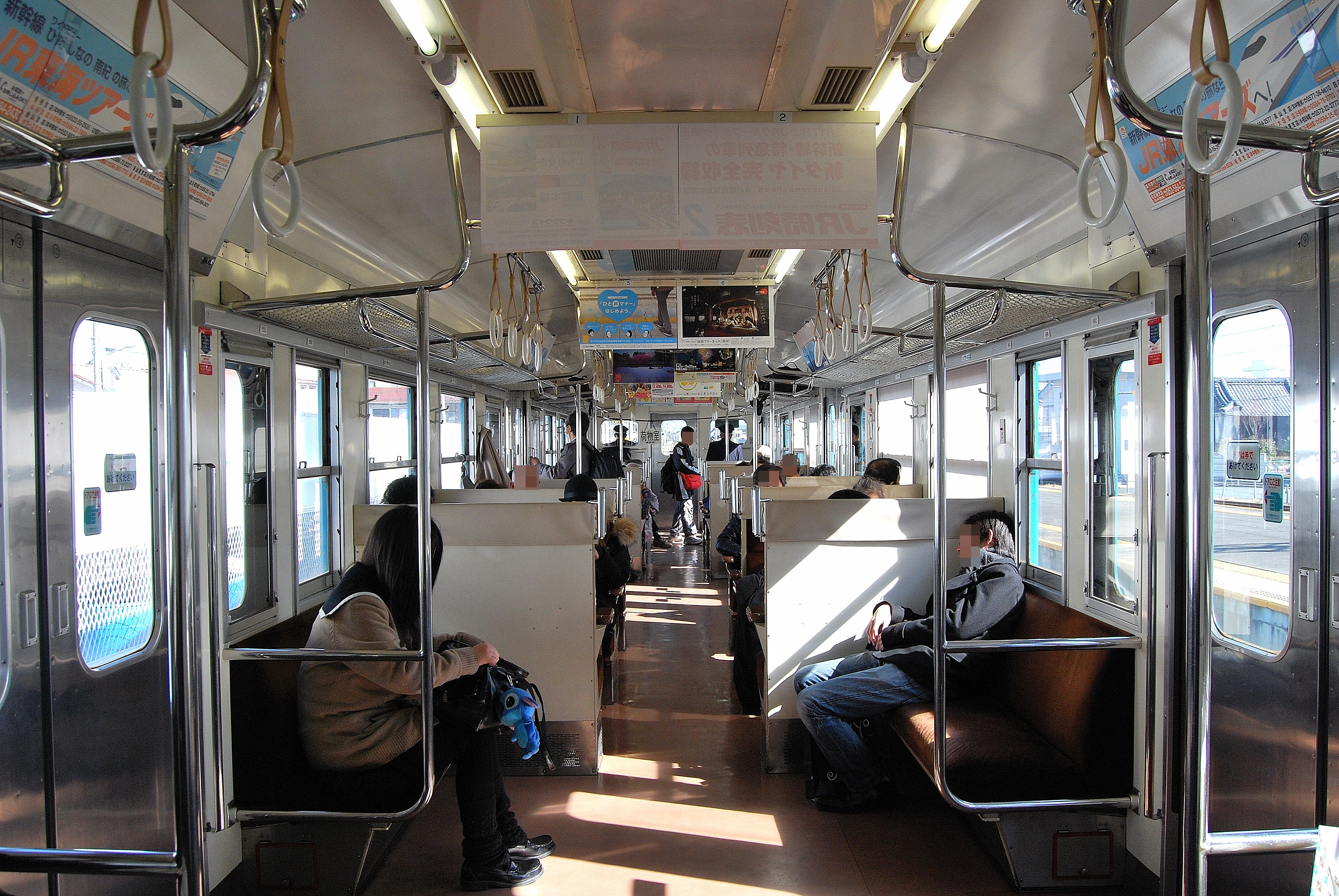
The interior of a KuHa 118 car in February 2012

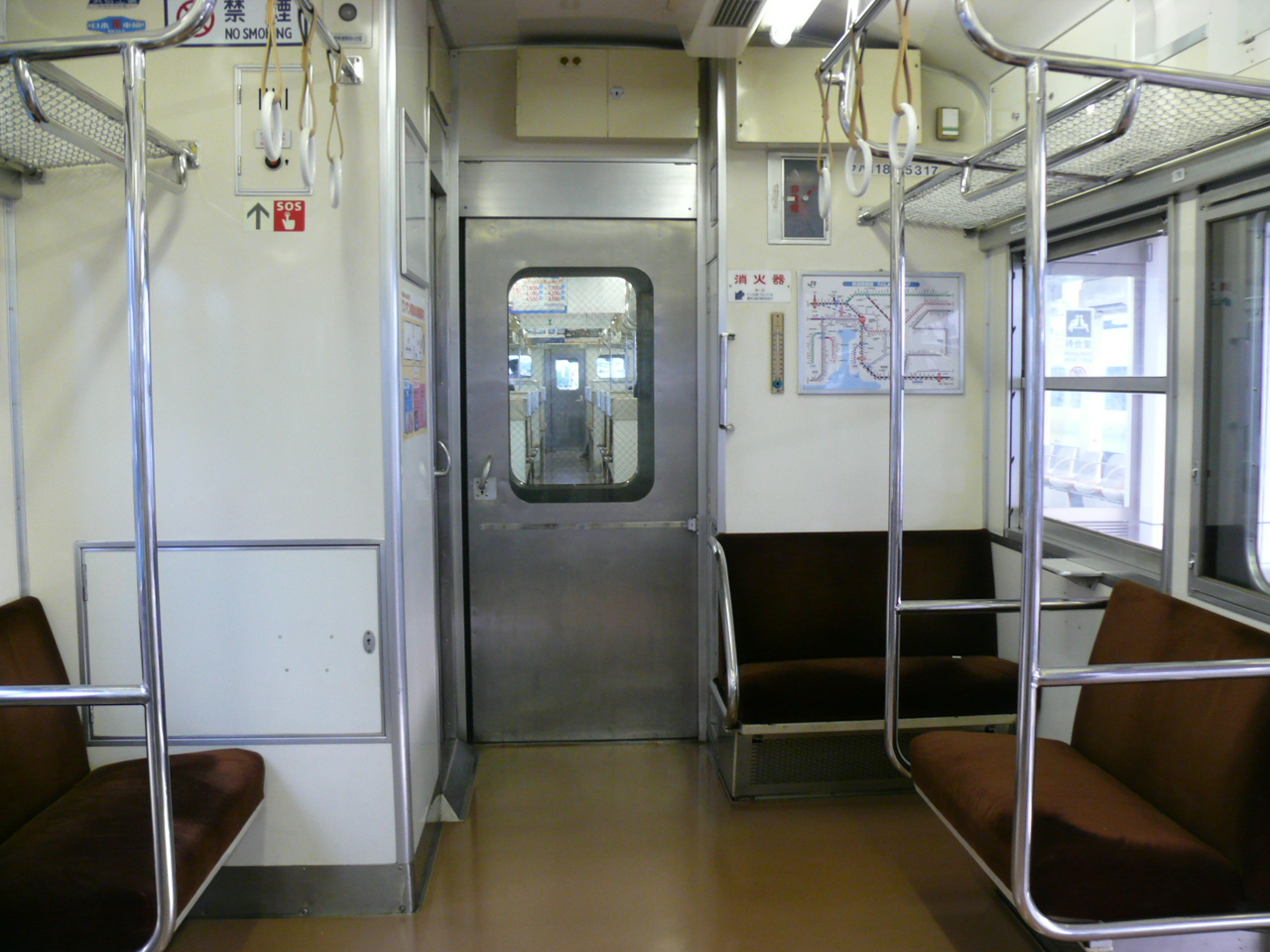
The end of car KuHa 118‑5317 in August 2009, with the toilet on the left

== Livery variations ==
Set E4 was repainted into its original JNR era livery in August 2009.

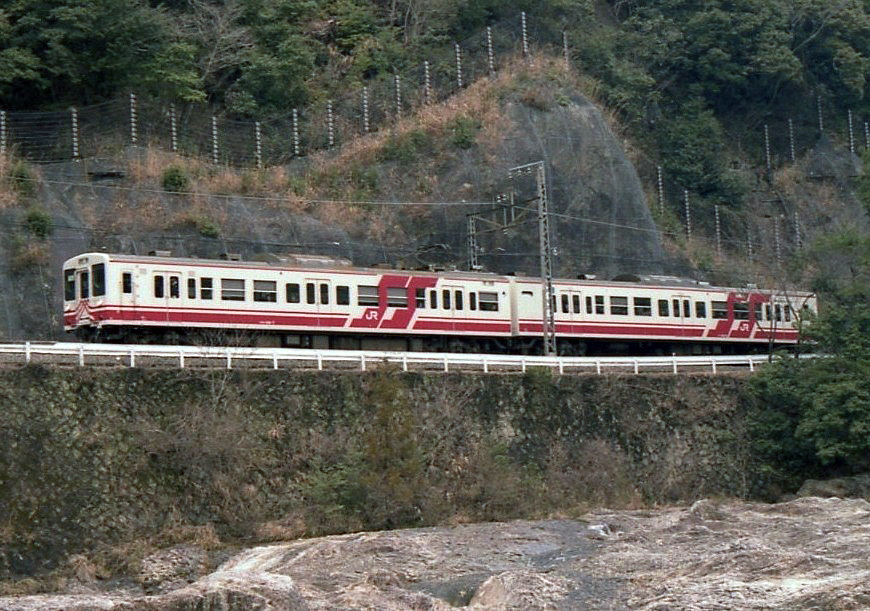
A 119 series set in "Suruga Shuttle" livery, circa 1990

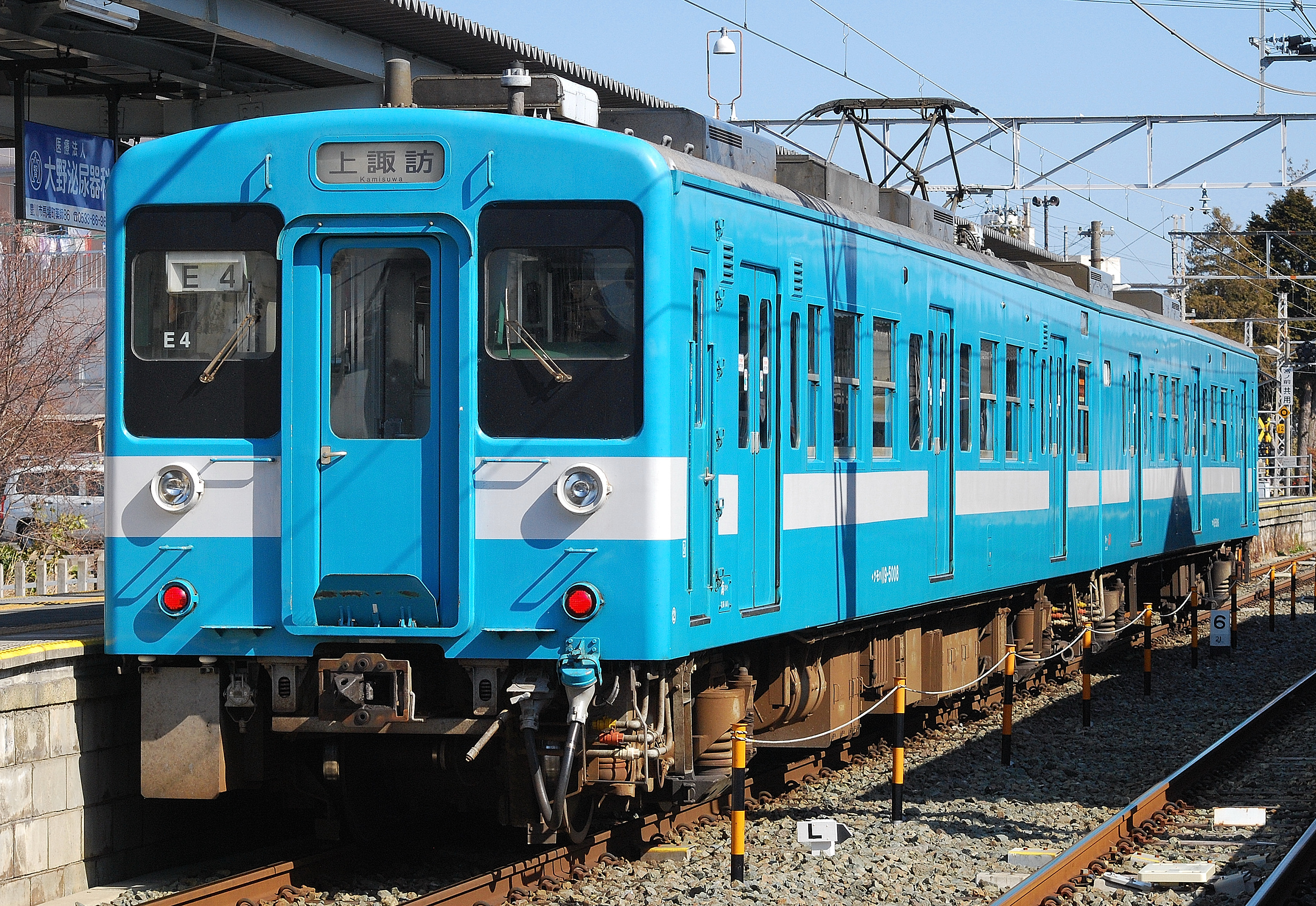
119-5000 series set E4 in February 2012, repainted into original JNR-era livery

== History ==
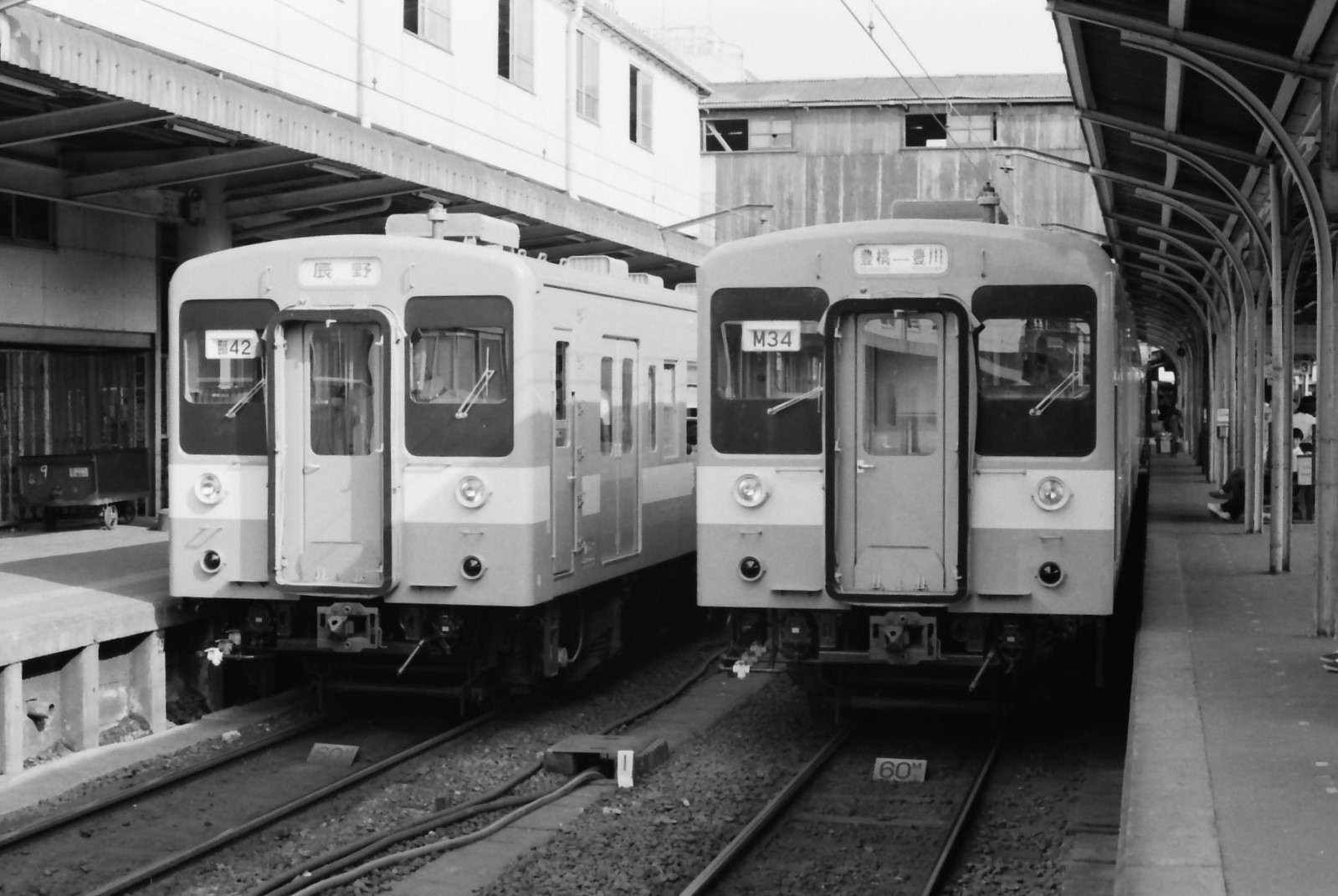
Two 119 series sets at Toyohashi Station in June 1983

From 18 March 1983, all Iida Line services were made no-smoking.

From 3 March 2001, Iida Line services were switched to wanman driver-only operation.

The fleet was replaced by 213-5000 and 313-3000 series EMUs on the Iida Line, with the last train running on 31 March 2012.

=== Resale ===
Following withdrawal, six 2-car 119 series sets were sold to the third sector railway operator Echizen Railway in Fukui Prefecture, where they were converted to become Echizen Railway 7000 series EMUs, entering service from February 2013.

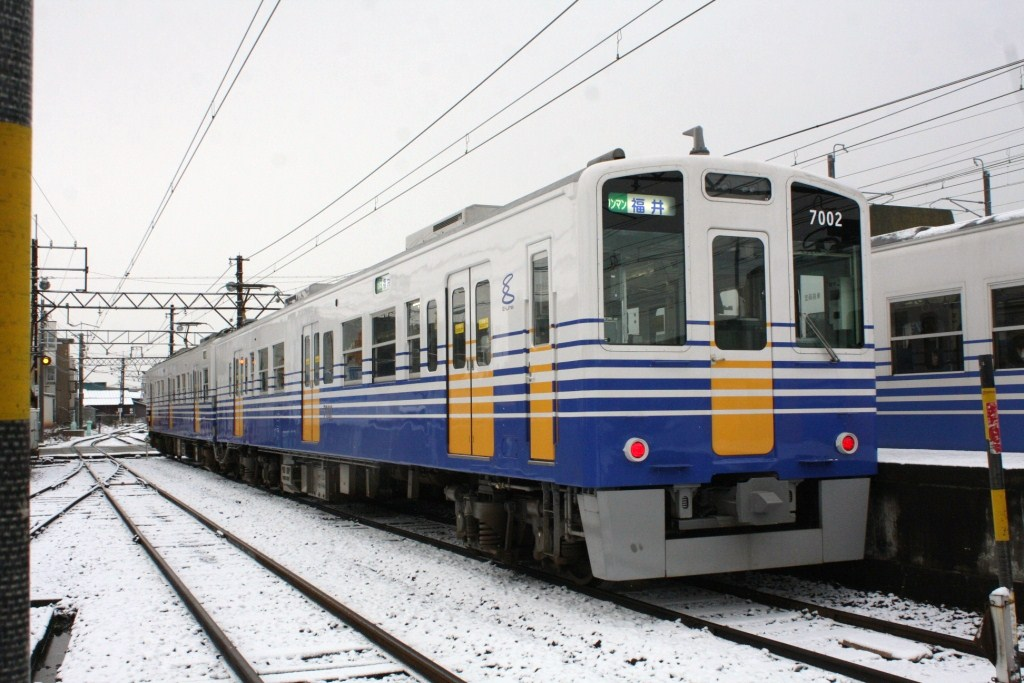
Echizen Railway 7000 series, February 2013
