= 313 series =

Japanese DC suburban electric multiple unit train type

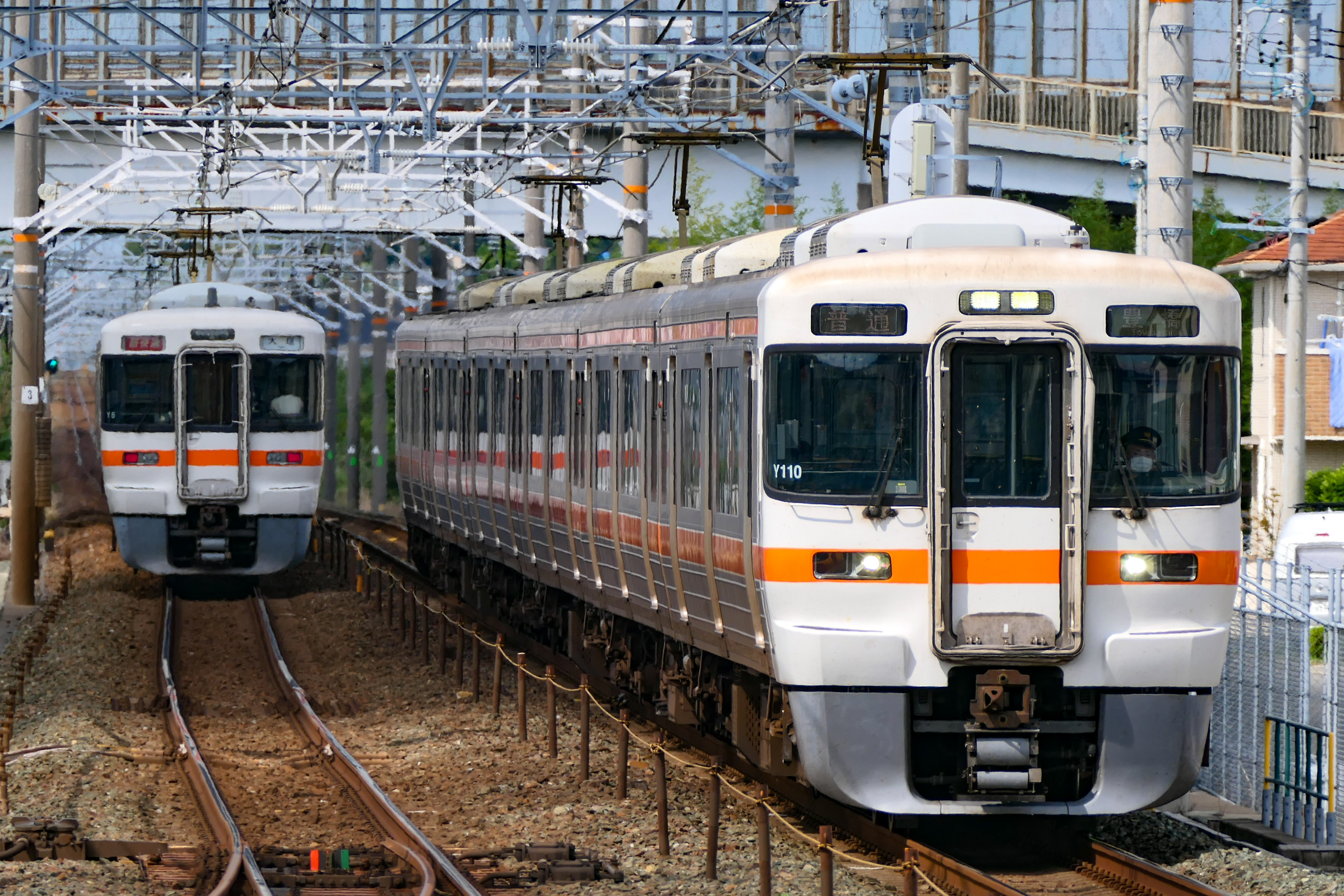
- 313-0 series set Y6 (left) and 313-5000 series set Y110 (right), September 2021
- In service: 1999–Present
- Manufacturers: Kinki Sharyo, Nippon Sharyo, Tokyu Car Corporation
- Replaced: 103 series, 113 series, 115 series, 117 series, 119 series, 165 series
- Constructed: 1999–2014, 2019
- Entered service: May 1999
- Number built: 541 vehicles
- Number in service: 539 vehicles
- Number scrapped: 2 vehicles (accident damage)
- Formation: 2/3/4/6 cars per trainset
- Operator: JR Central
- Depots: Ōgaki, Jinryō, Shizuoka
- Lines served: Tōkaidō Main Line; Chūō Main Line; Iida Line; Minobu Line; Gotemba Line; Kansai Main Line; Shinonoi Line; Shinetsu Main Line

Specifications
- Car body construction: Stainless steel
- Doors: 3 pairs per side
- Maximum speed: 130 km/h (81 mph) (313-8000 series); 120 km/h (75 mph) (other series)
- Traction system: IGBT-VVVF
- Electric systems: 1,500 V DC (overhead catenary)
- Current collection: Pantograph
- Braking systems: Electronically controlled pneumatic brakes with regenerative or dynamic braking, snow-resistant brake
- Safety systems: ATS-ST, ATS-PT
- Coupling system: Shibata Type
- Multiple working: 211/213/311 series
- Track gauge: 1,067 mm (3 ft 6 in)

The 313 series (Japanese: 313系, Hepburn: 313-kei) is a DC suburban electric multiple unit (EMU) train type operated by Central Japan Railway Company (JR Central) in Japan since 1999.

The design was introduced from spring 1999 to replace older 113 and 115 series EMUs.

== Variants ==
Series	Formation	Line(s) used
313-0 series	4-car	Tōkaidō Main Line (Toyohashi – Maibara)
313-300 series	2-car	Tōkaidō Main Line (Toyohashi – Maibara)
313-1000 series	4-car	Chūō Main Line (Nagoya – Nakatsugawa)
313-1300 series	2-car	Tōkaidō Main Line
313-1500 series	3-car	Chūō Main Line (Nagoya – Nakatsugawa); Kansai Main Line (Nagoya – Kameyama)
313-1600 series	3-car	Chūō Main Line (Nagoya – Nakatsugawa); Kansai Main Line (Nagoya – Kameyama)
313-1700 series	3-car	Iida Line, Chūō Main Line, Kansai Main Line
313-2300 series	2-car	Tōkaidō Main Line, Gotemba Line, Minobu Line
313-2350 series	2-car	Tōkaidō Main Line, Gotemba Line, Minobu Line
313-2500 series	3-car	Tōkaidō Main Line (Atami – Toyohashi)
313-2600 series	3-car	Tōkaidō Main Line, Gotemba Line, Minobu Line
313-3000 series	2-car	Kansai Main Line, Chūō Main Line; Gotemba Line, Minobu Line
313-3100 series	2-car	Gotemba Line, Minobu Line
313-5000 series	6-car	Tōkaidō Main Line (Toyohashi – Ōgaki)
313-5300 series	2-car	Tōkaidō Main Line
313-8000 series	3-car	Chūō Main Line (Nagoya – Nakatsugawa) (1999–2022) Tōkaidō Main Line (2022–present)

== 313-0 series ==
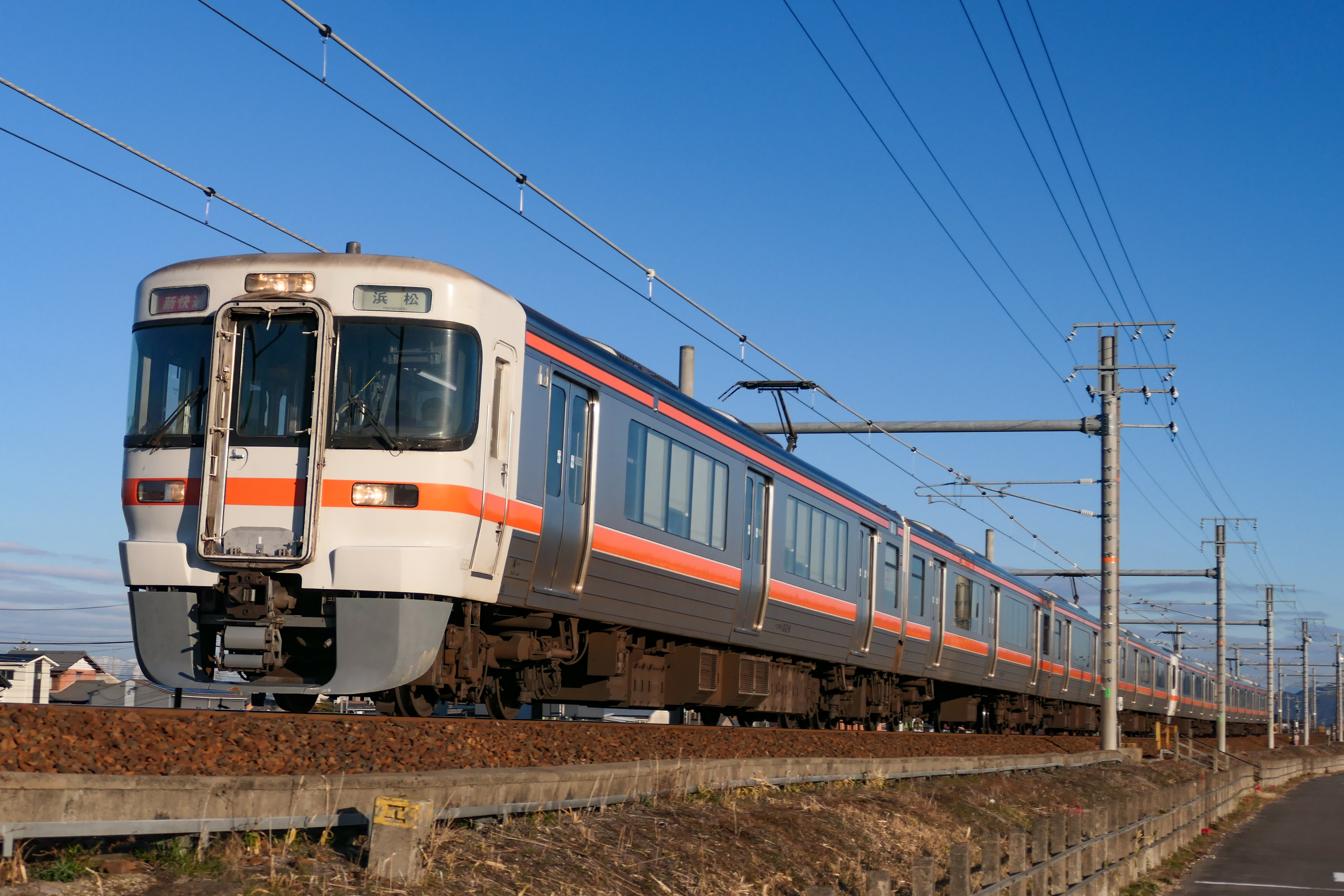
313-0 series 4-car set Y9, January 2022

15 x 4-car sets (60 vehicles) built by Kinki Sharyo, Nippon Sharyo, and Tokyu Car Corporation between July and September 1999 with flip-over transverse seating.

=== 4-car Ōgaki sets Y1 to Y15 ===
Designation	Mc	T	M	Tc'
Numbering	KuMoHa 313	SaHa 313	MoHa 313	KuHa 312

== 313-300 series ==
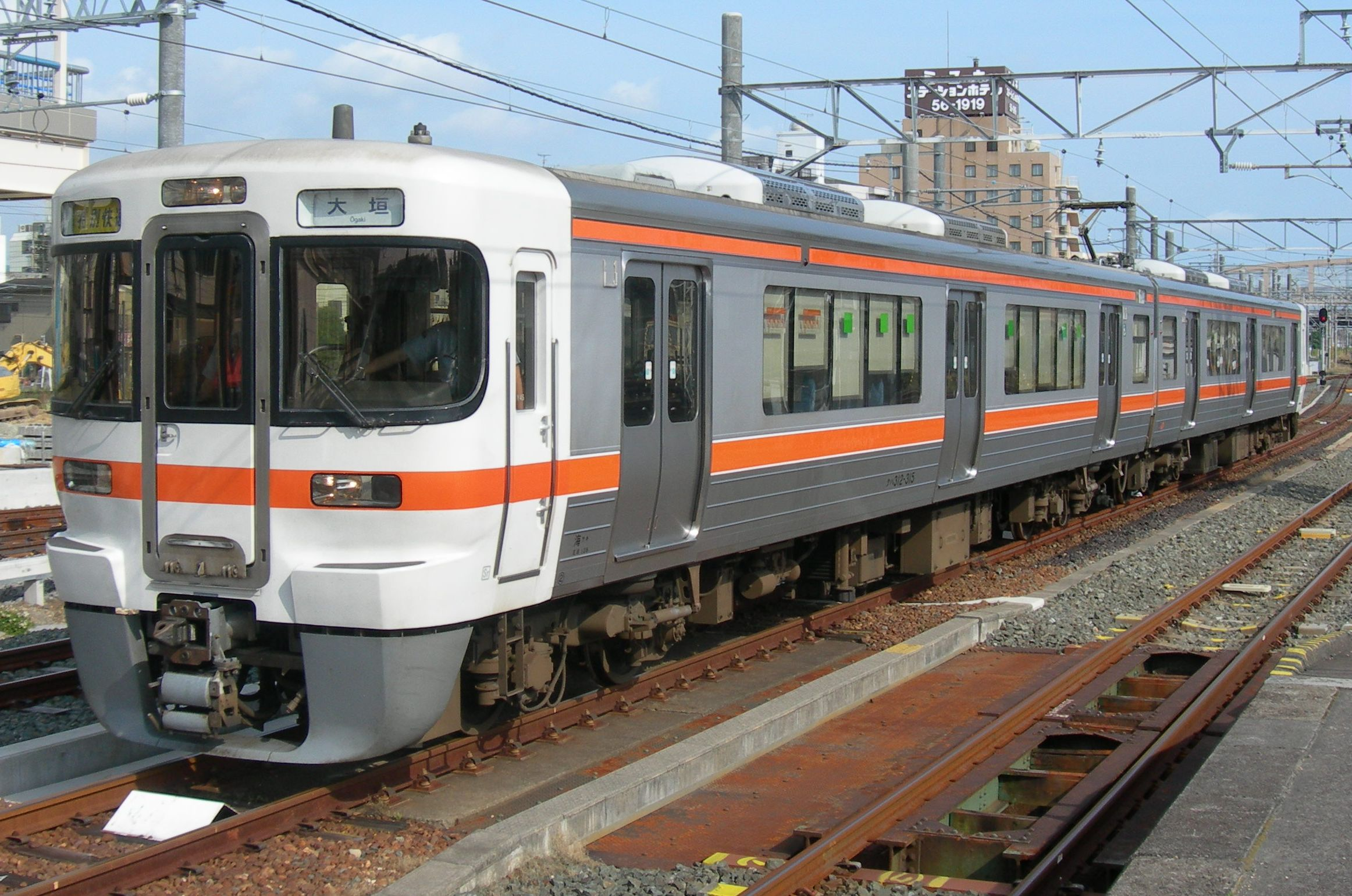
313-300 series 2-car set Y45, June 2008

16 x 2-car sets (32 vehicles) built by Kinki Sharyo, Nippon Sharyo, and Tokyu Car Corporation in September 1999 with flip-over transverse seating.

=== 2-car Ōgaki sets Y31 to Y46 ===
Designation	Mc	Tc'
Numbering	KuMoHa 313-300	KuHa 312-300

== 313-1000 series ==
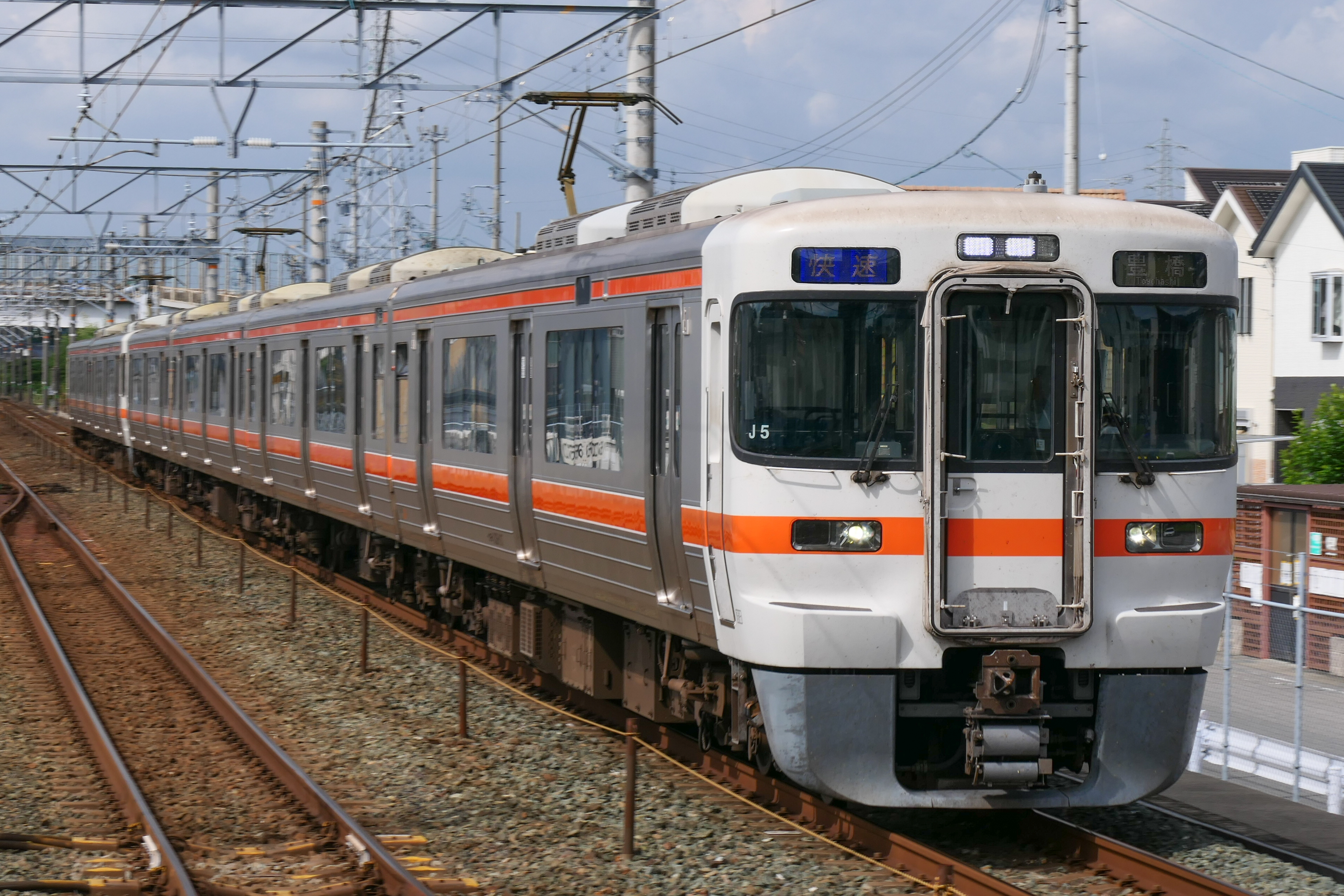
313-1100 series 4-car set J5, September 2021

3 x four-car and 3 x two-car sets (21 vehicles) built by Nippon Sharyo and Tokyu Car Corporation between February and March 1999 with flip-over transverse seating.

A further seven 4-car sets, J1 to J7, were delivered from Nippon Sharyo to Ōgaki depot between August and October 2010.

A further three 4-car sets, J8 to J10, were delivered in 2014.

=== 4-car Jinryō sets B1 to B5 ===
==== B1 to B3 ====
Designation	Mc	T	M	Tc'
Numbering	KuMoHa 313-1000	SaHa 313-1000	MoHa 313-1000	KuHa 312

==== B4 to B5 ====
Designation	Mc	T	M	Tc'
Numbering	KuMoHa 313-1100	SaHa 313-1100	MoHa 313-1100	KuHa 312-400

=== 4-car Ōgaki sets J1 to J7 ===
Designation	Mc	T	M	Tc'
Numbering	KuMoHa 313-1100	SaHa 313-1100	MoHa 313-1100	KuHa 312-400

=== 3-car Jinryō sets B101 to B107 ===
==== B101 to B103 ====
Designation	Mc	M	Tc'
Numbering	KuMoHa 313-1500	MoHa 313-1500	KuHa 312

==== B104 to B107 ====
Designation	Mc	M	Tc'
Numbering	KuMoHa 313-1600	MoHa 313-1600	KuHa 312-400

=== 3-car Jinryō sets B151 to B153 ===
Designation	Mc	M	Tc'
Numbering	KuMoHa 313-1700	MoHa 313-1700	KuHa 312-400

=== Interior ===
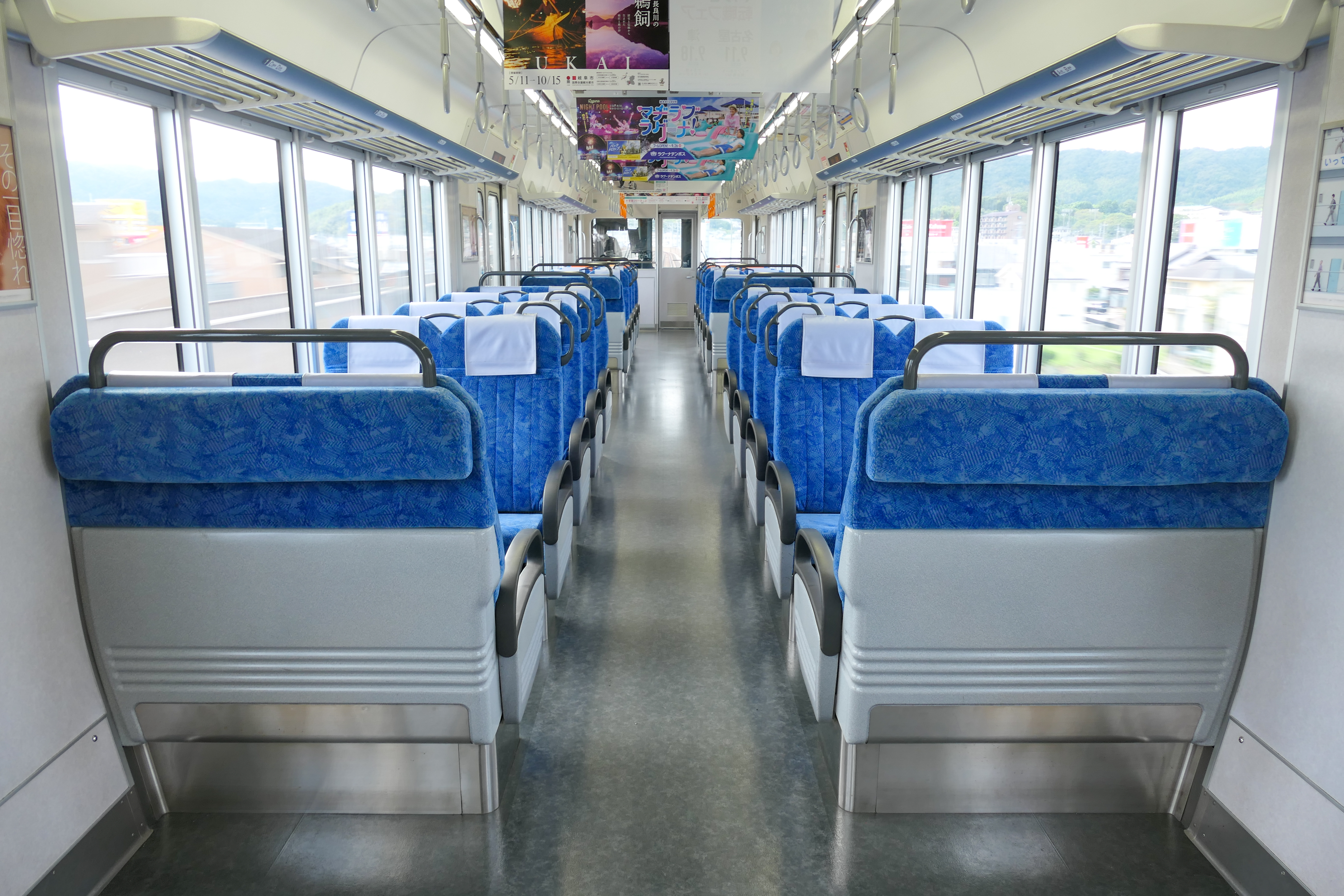
Interior view, September 2021

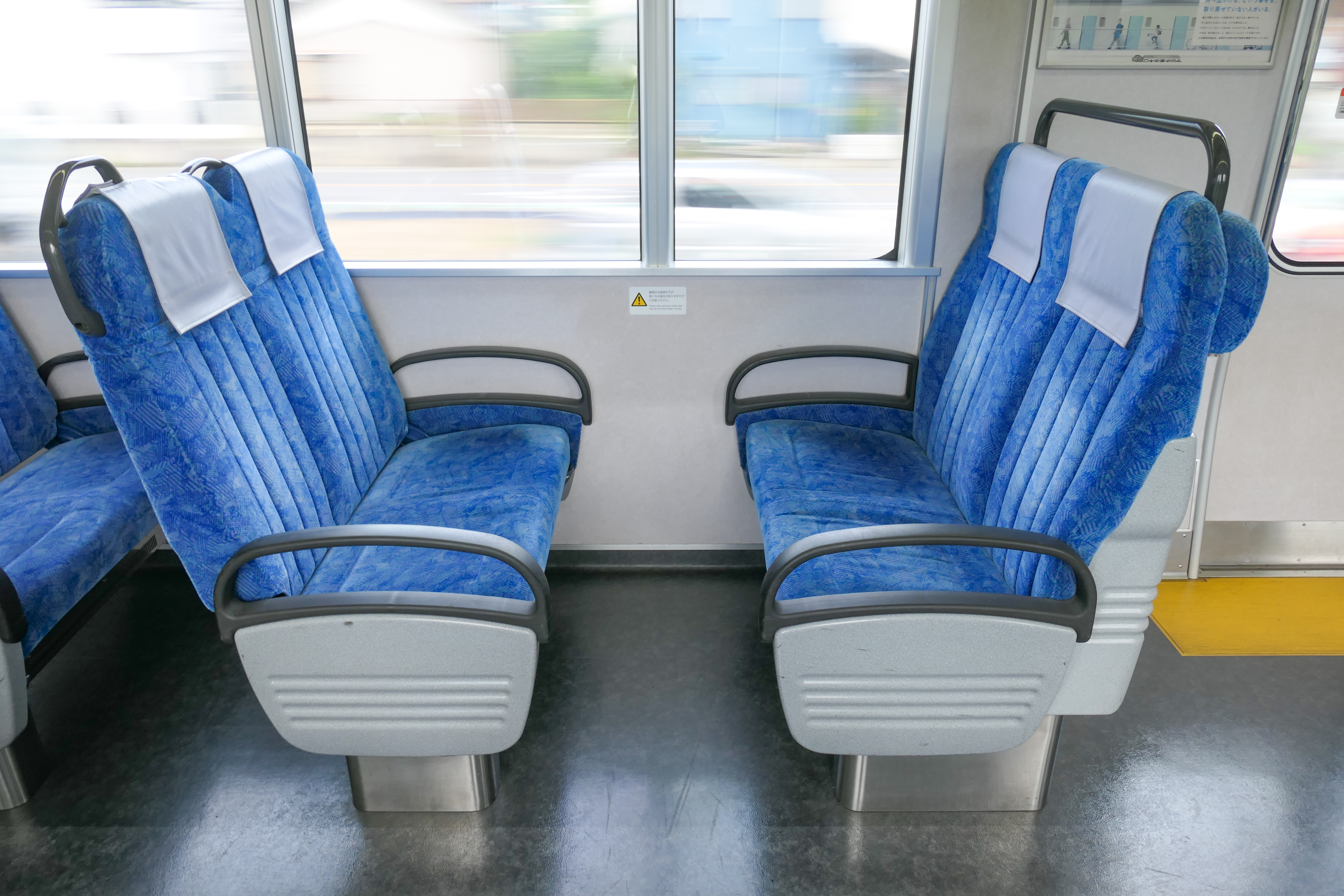
General seats, September 2021

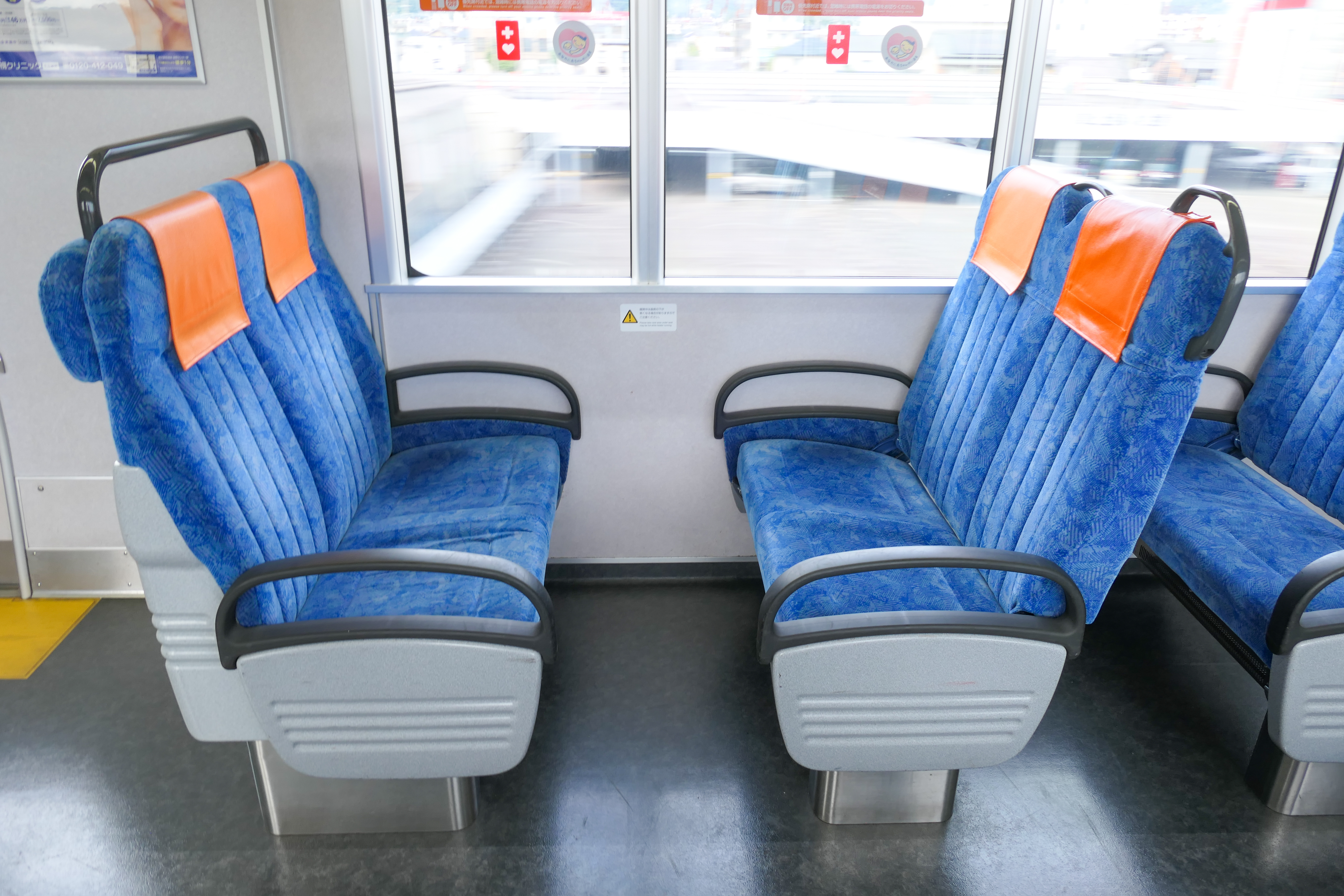
Priority seats, September 2021

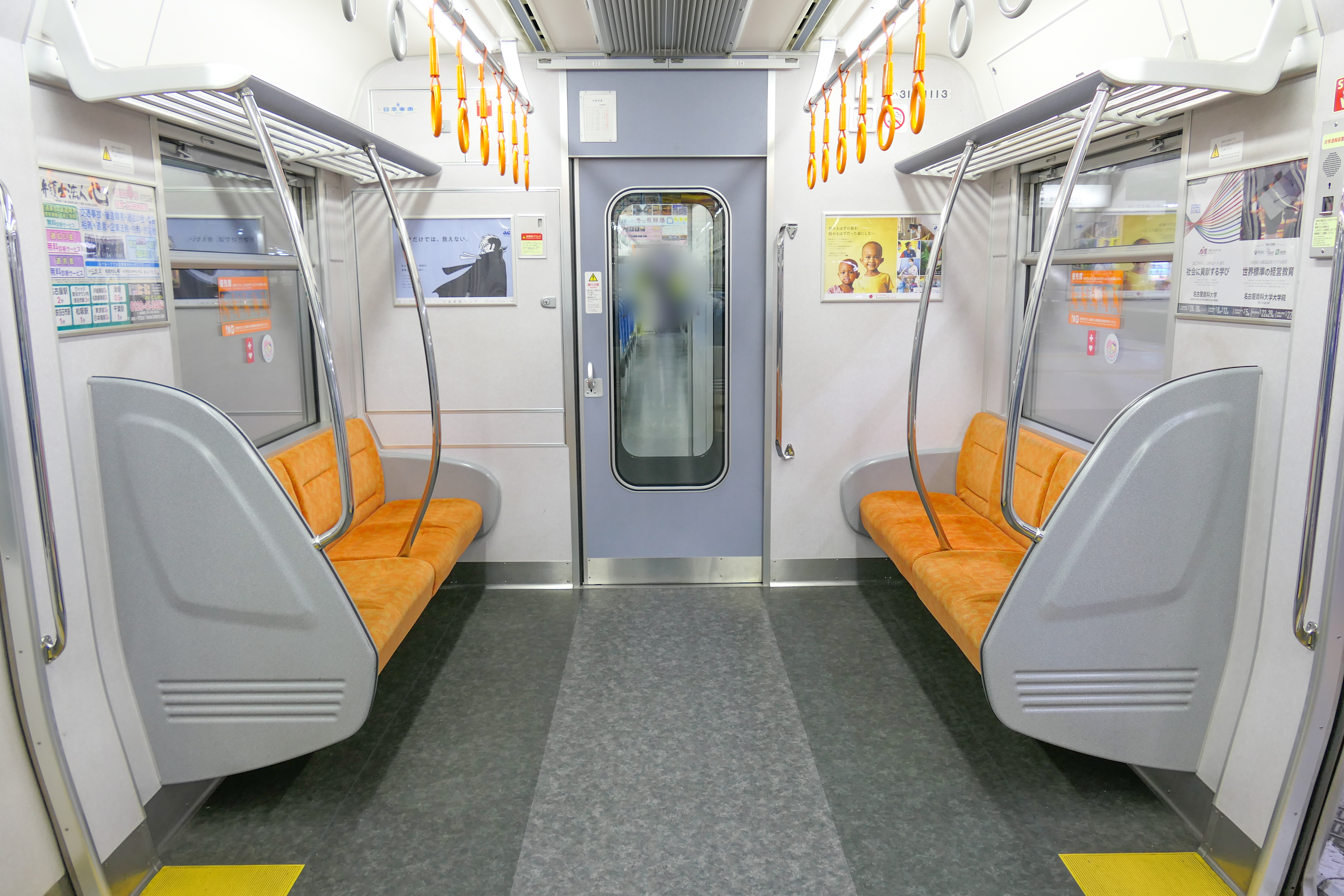
Priority seats (longitudinal), January 2022

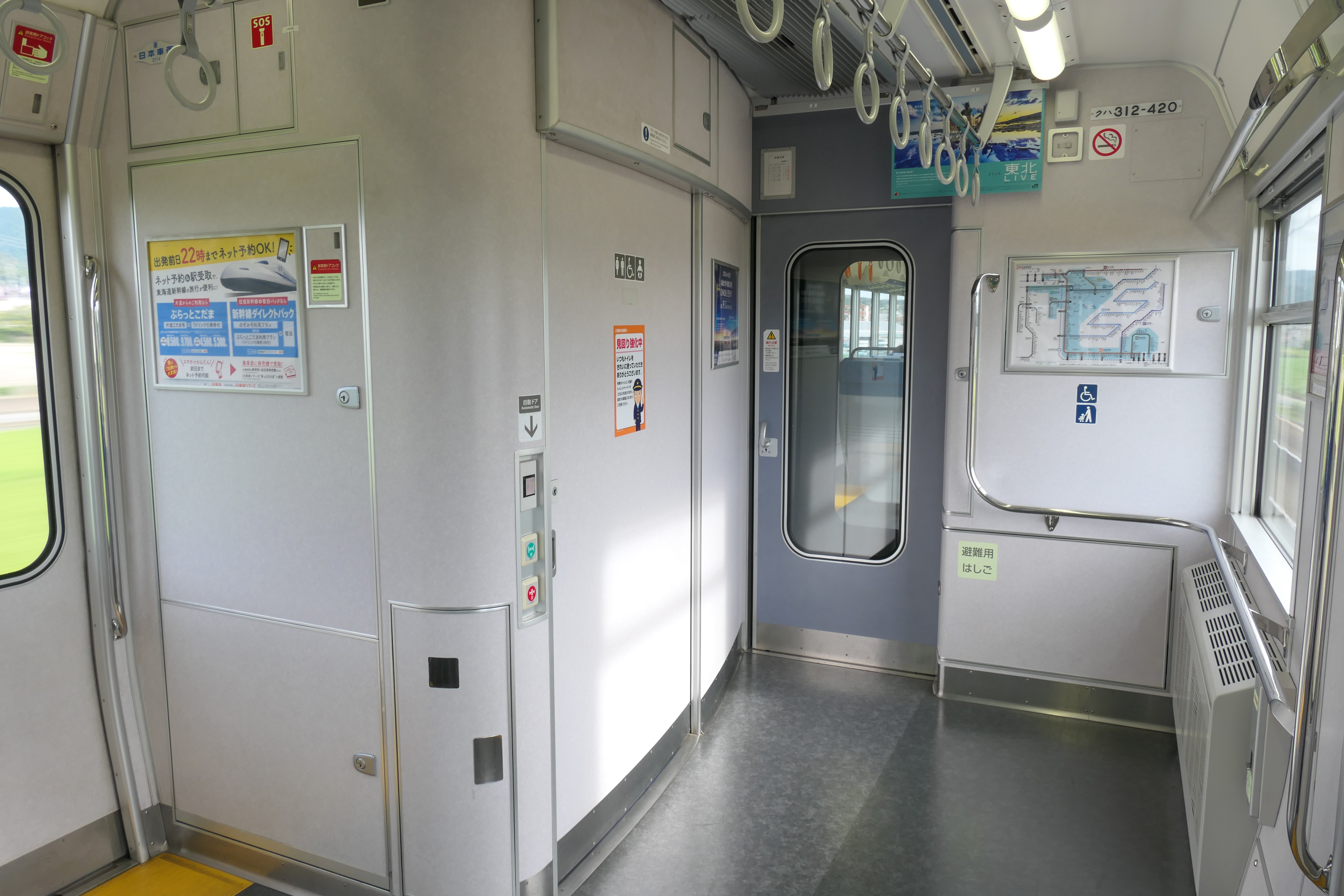
Toilet, September 2021

== 313-1300 series ==
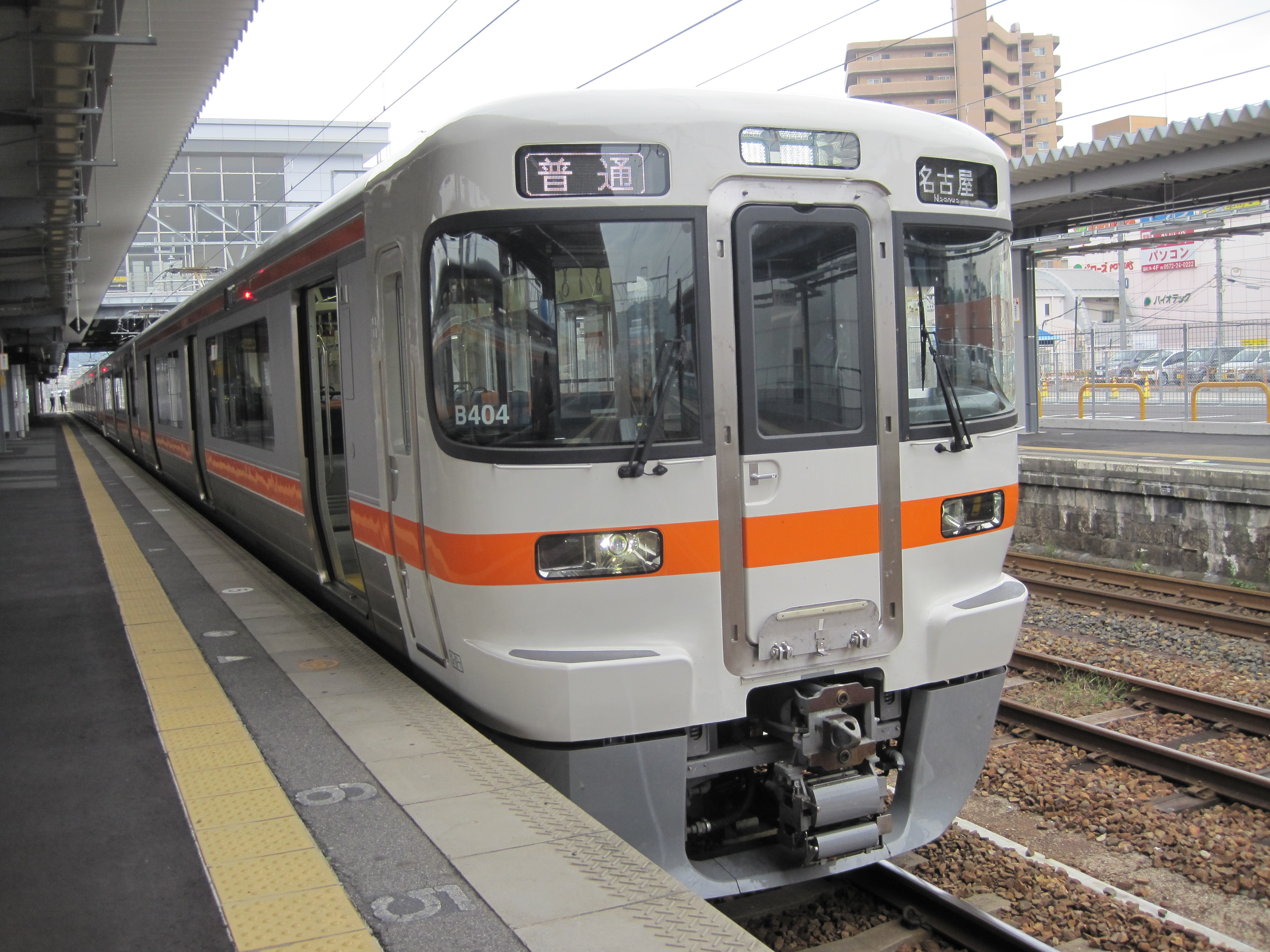
313-1300 series 2-car set B404, October 2010

4 x 2-car 4th-batch sets (8 vehicles) were built by Nippon Sharyo in June 2010. The sets are numbered B401 to B404 and allocated to Jinryō depot. All cars feature flip-over transverse seating. A further four 2-car sets, numbered B501 to B504, were delivered from Nippon Sharyo to Jinryō depot on 3 August 2011.

=== 2-car Jinryō sets B401–B404, B501–B504 ===
Designation	Tc'	Mc
Numbering	KuHa 312-1300	KuMoHa 313-1300

== 313-2000 series ==
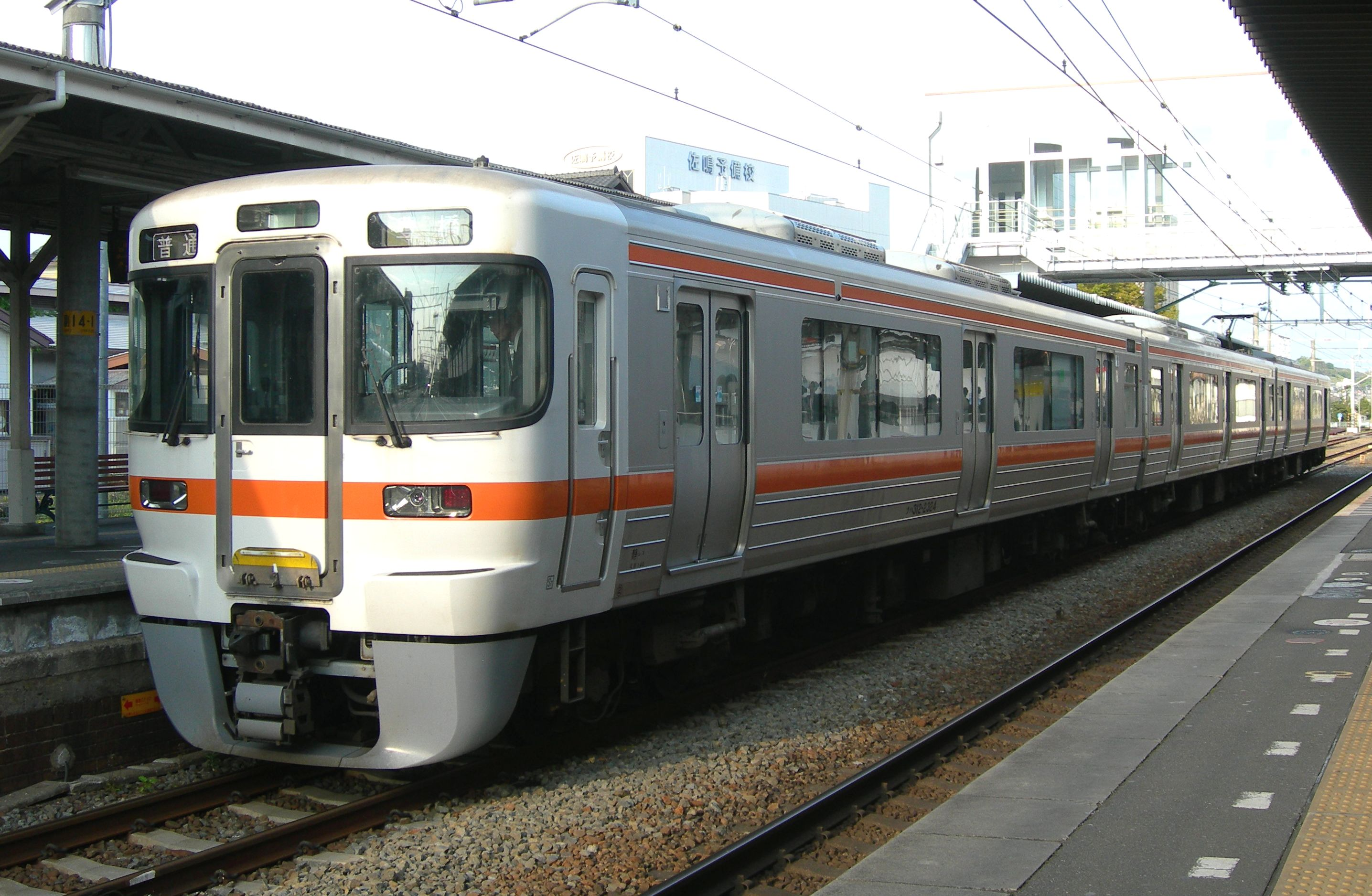
3-car set T15, April 2010

9 x 2-car and 27 x 3-car sets (99 vehicles) built by Kinki Sharyo and Nippon Sharyo between November 2006 and February 2007 with longitudinal seating.

=== 2-car Shizuoka sets W1 to W9 ===
==== W1–W2 ====
Designation	Mc	Tc'
Numbering	KuMoHa 313-2350	KuHa 312-2300

==== W3–W9 ====
Designation	Mc	Tc'
Numbering	KuMoHa 313-2300	KuHa 312-2300

=== 3-car Shizuoka sets T1 to T17 ===
Designation	Mc	M	Tc'
Numbering	KuMoHa 313-2500	MoHa 313-2500	KuHa 312-2300

=== 3-car Shizuoka sets N1 to N10 ===
Designation	Mc	M	Tc'
Numbering	KuMoHa 313-2600	MoHa 313-2600	KuHa 312-2300

=== Interior ===
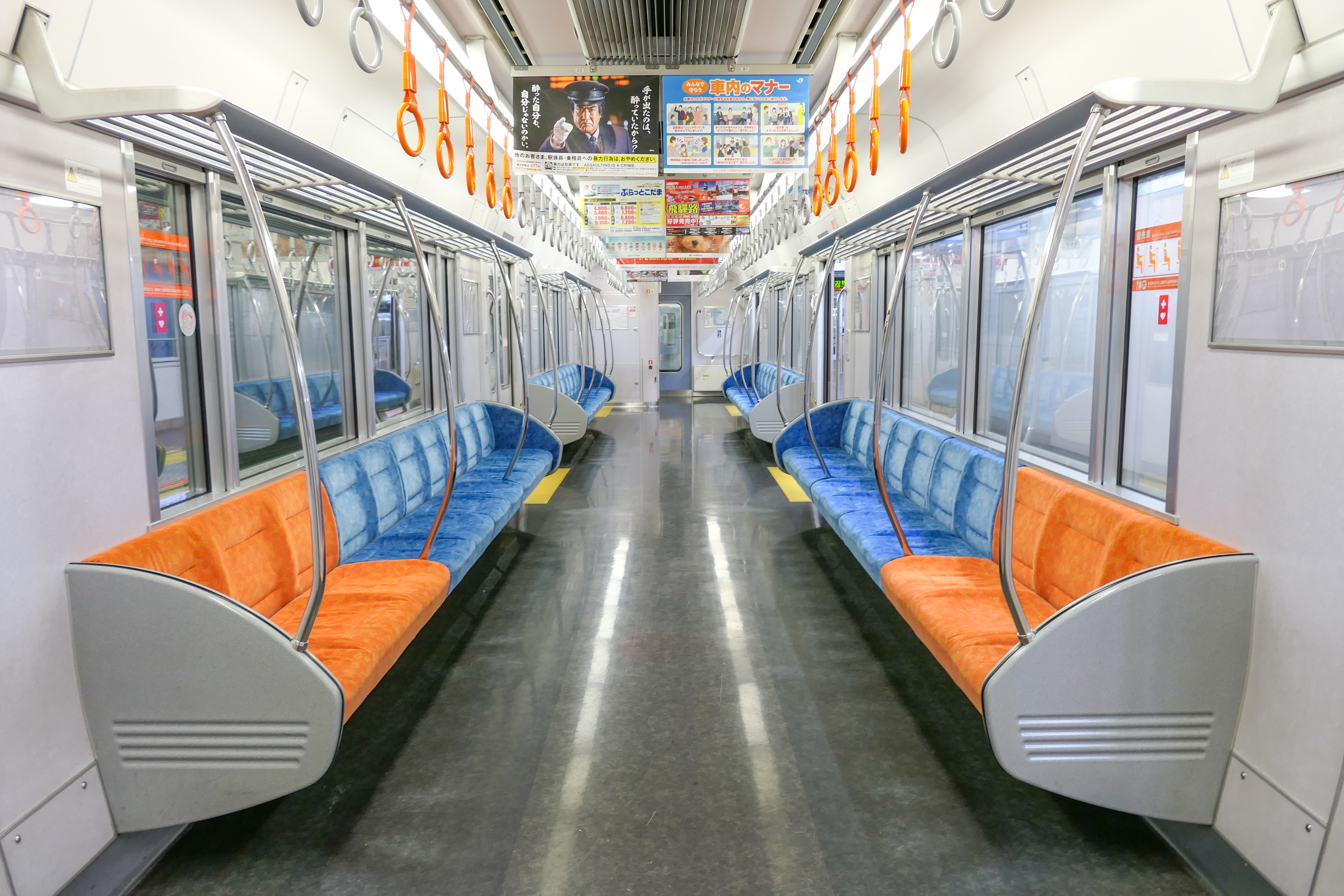
313-2000 series interior view showing longitudinal seating, January 2022

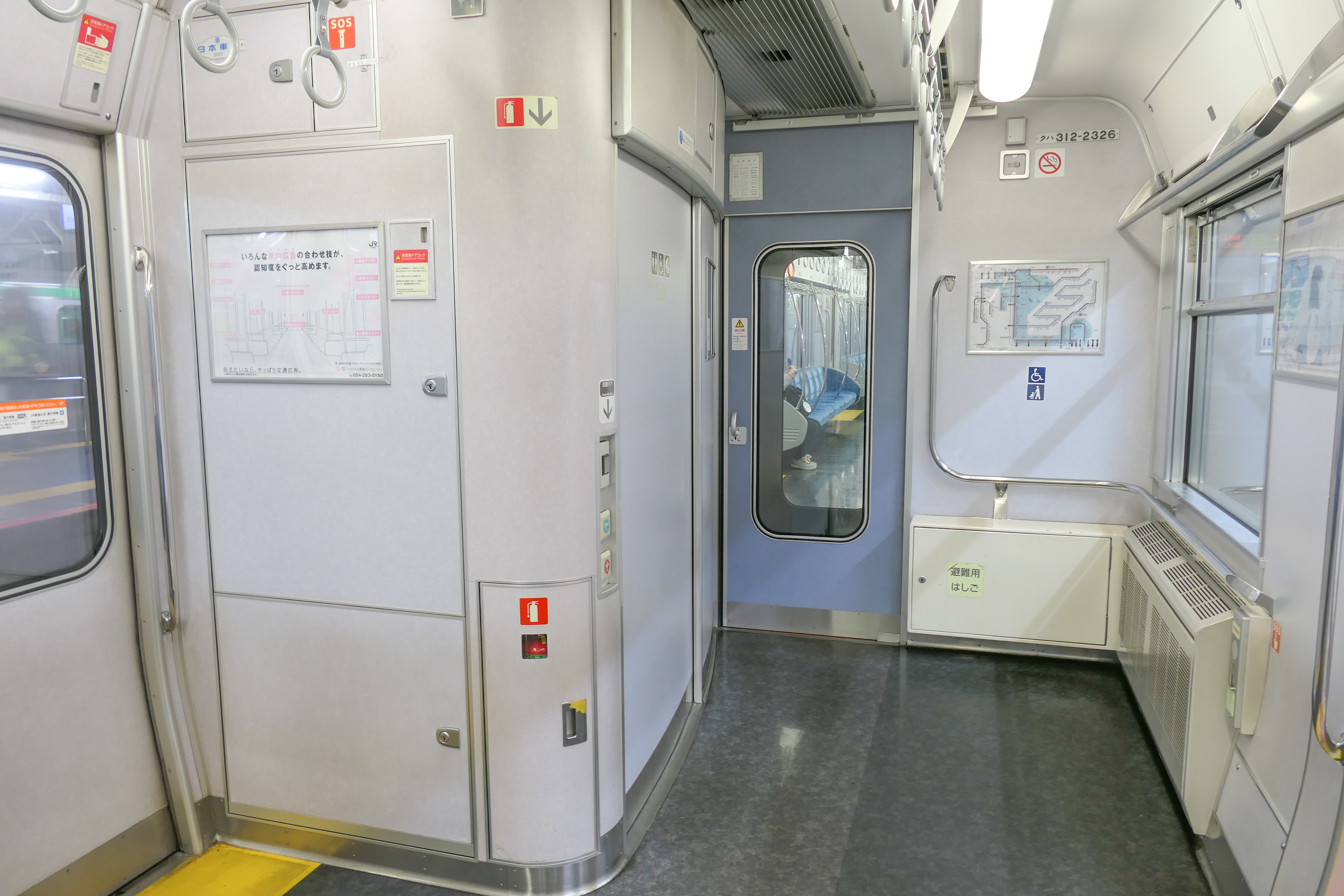
Toilet, January 2022

== 313-3000 series ==
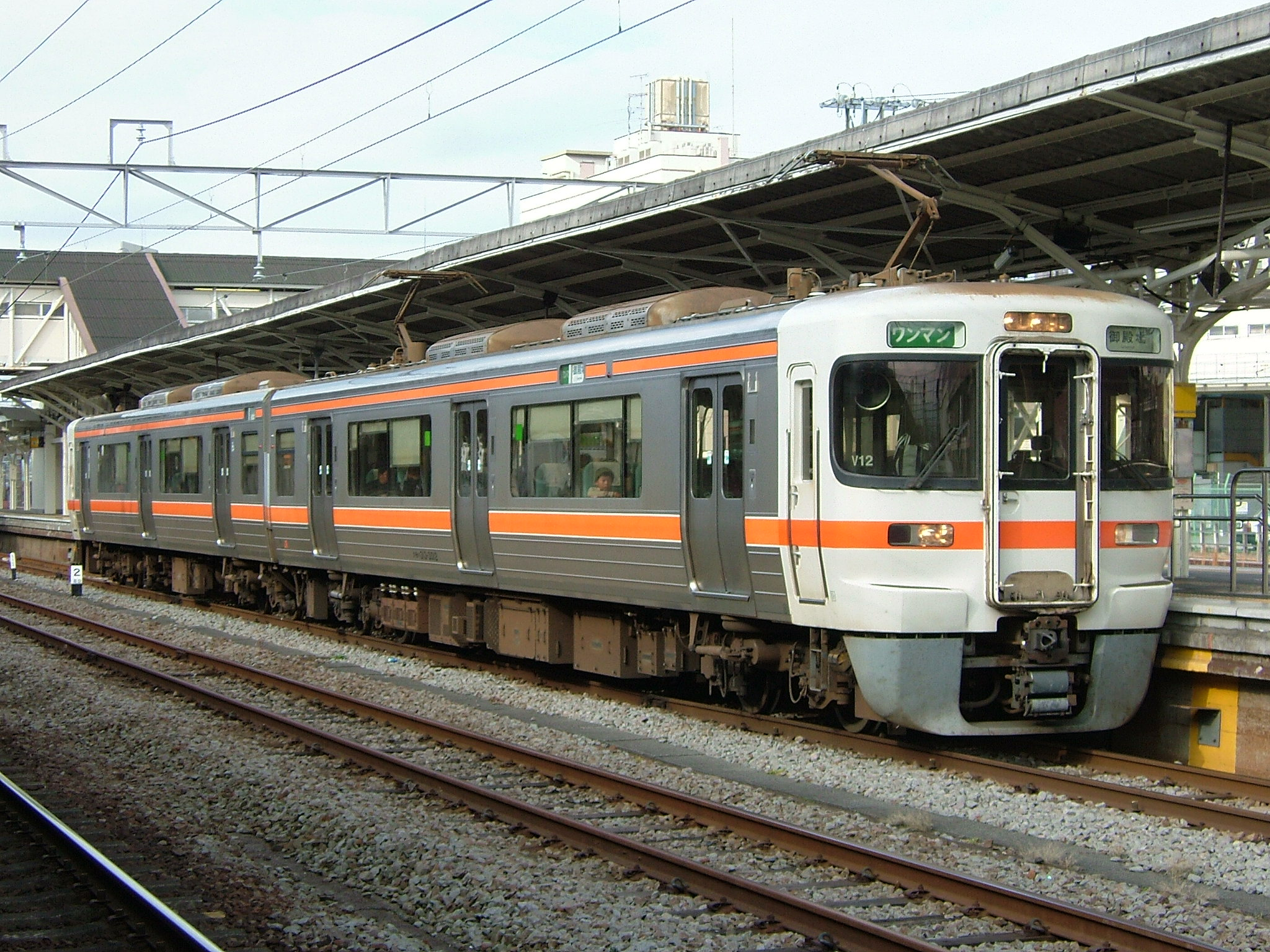
313-3000 series 2-car set V12, January 2009

12 x 2-car and 16 x 2-car sets (56 vehicles) with fixed transverse seating and longitudinal seating.

=== 2-car Shizuoka sets V1 to V14 ===
==== V1–V12 ====
Designation	Mc	Tc'
Numbering	KuMoHa 313-3000	KuHa 312-3000

==== V13–V14 ====
Designation	Mc	Tc'
Numbering	KuMoHa 313-3100	KuHa 312-3100

=== 2-car Jinryō sets B301 to B316 ===
Designation	Mc	Tc'
Numbering	KuMoHa 313-3000	KuHa 312-3000

=== Interior ===
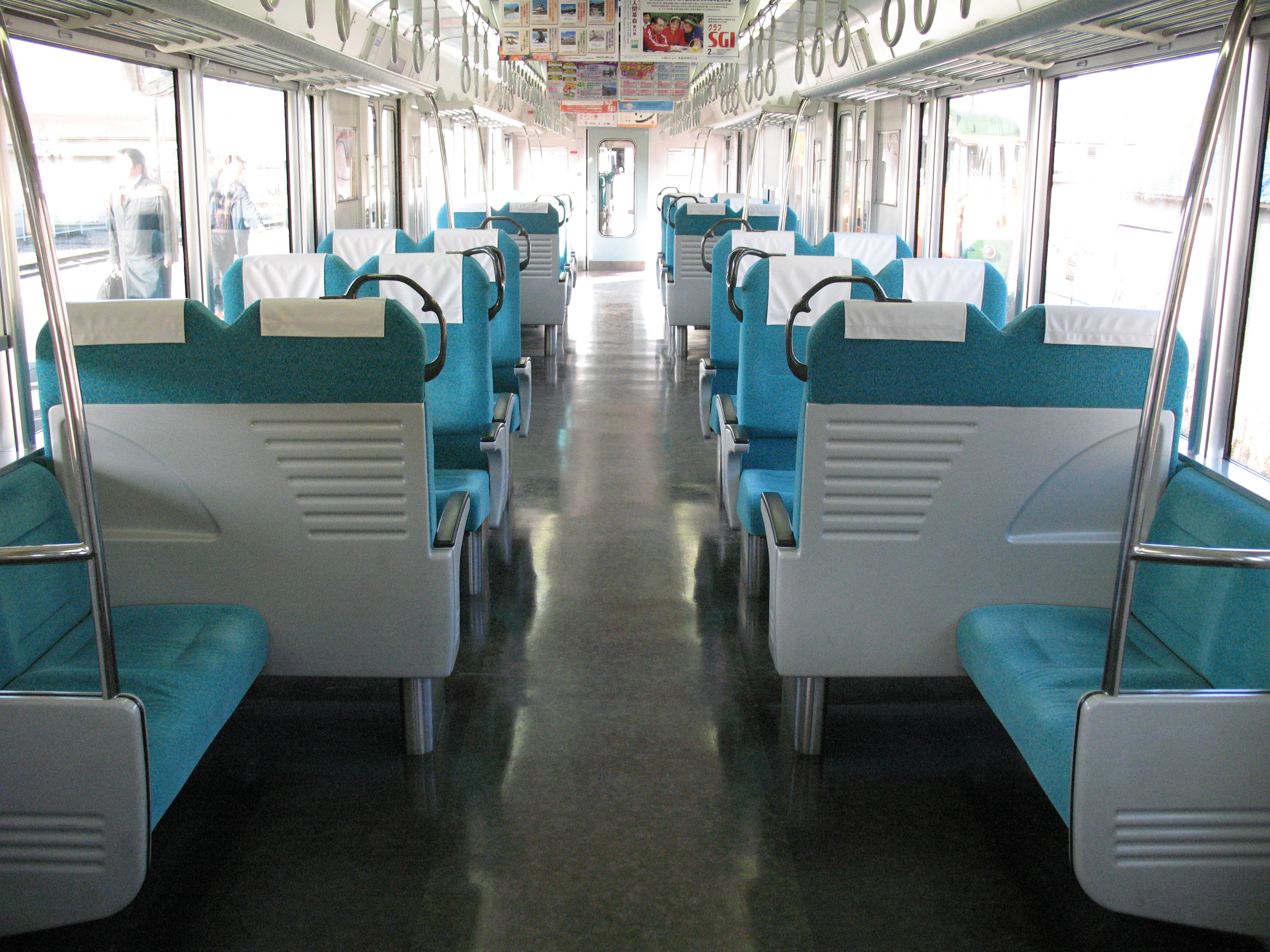
313-3000 series interior view, January 2007

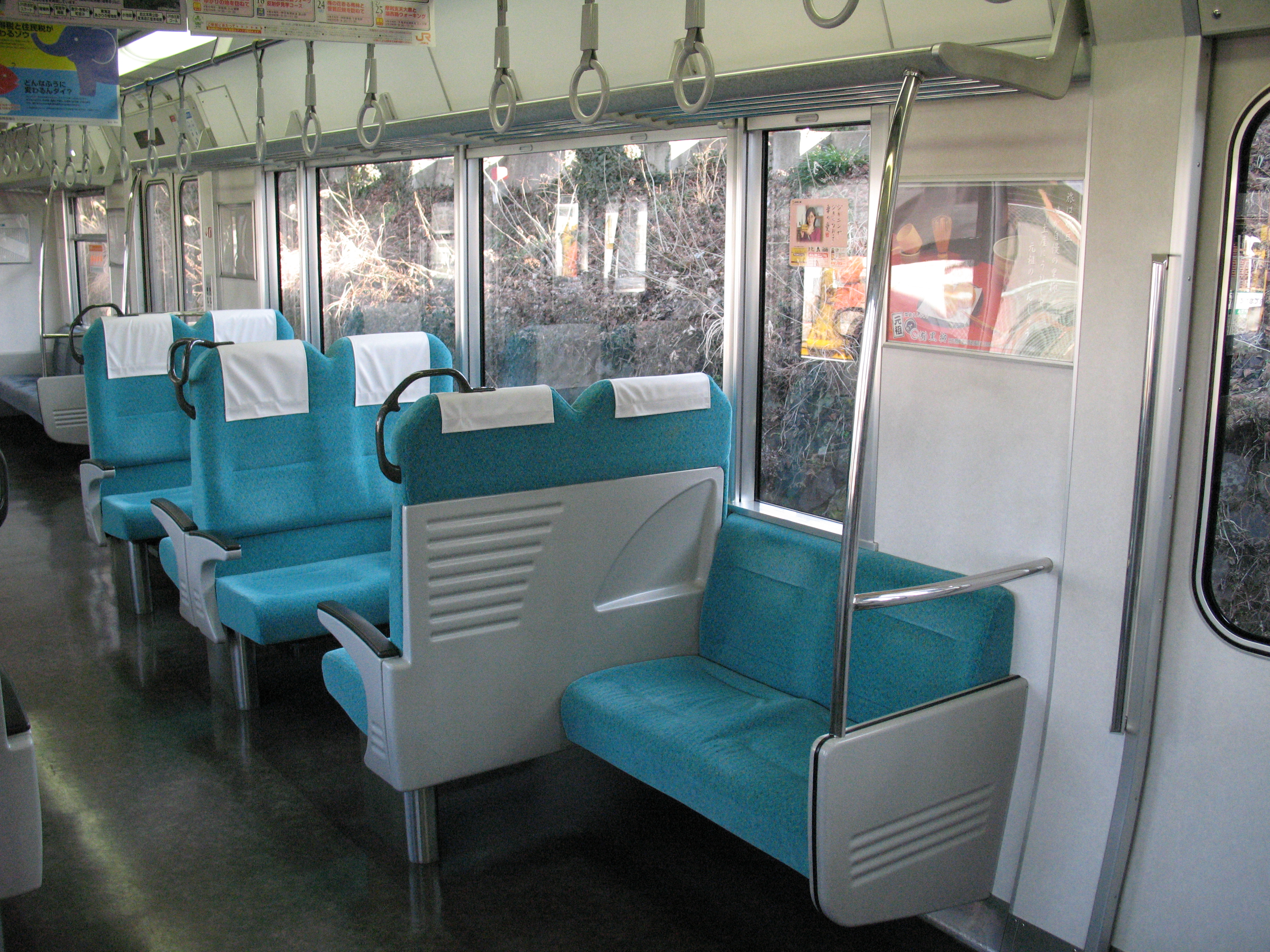
313-3000 series interior view, January 2007

== 313-5000 series ==
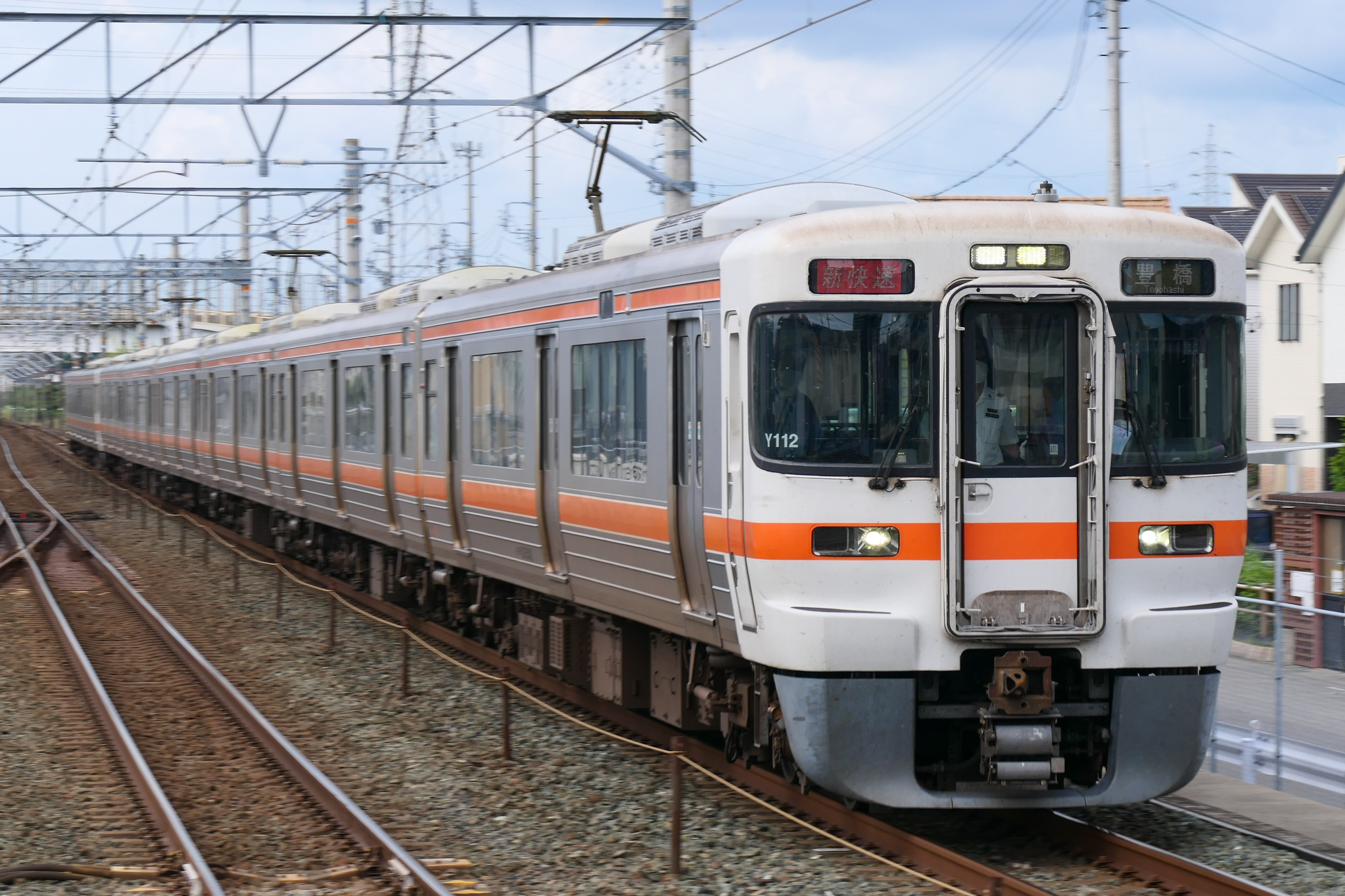
313-5000 series 6-car set Y112, September 2021

12 x 6-car sets (72 vehicles) were built by Nippon Sharyo in 2006 with flip-over transverse seating. This was the first conventional (i.e. non-Shinkansen) rolling stock to feature yaw dampers between intermediate cars.

Further (4th-batch) sets were delivered in 2010.

Two cars—designated KuHa 312-5102 and MoHa 313-5402—were built in 2019 to replace KuHa 312-5002 and MoHa 313-5302, respectively. This follows an accident in which set Y102 was involved in 2017.

=== 6-car Ōgaki sets Y101 to Y113 ===
Designation	Mc	T	M	T	M	Tc'
Numbering	KuMoHa 313-5000	SaHa 313-5300	MoHa 313-5000	SaHa 313-5000	MoHa 313-5300	KuHa 312-5000

=== Interior ===
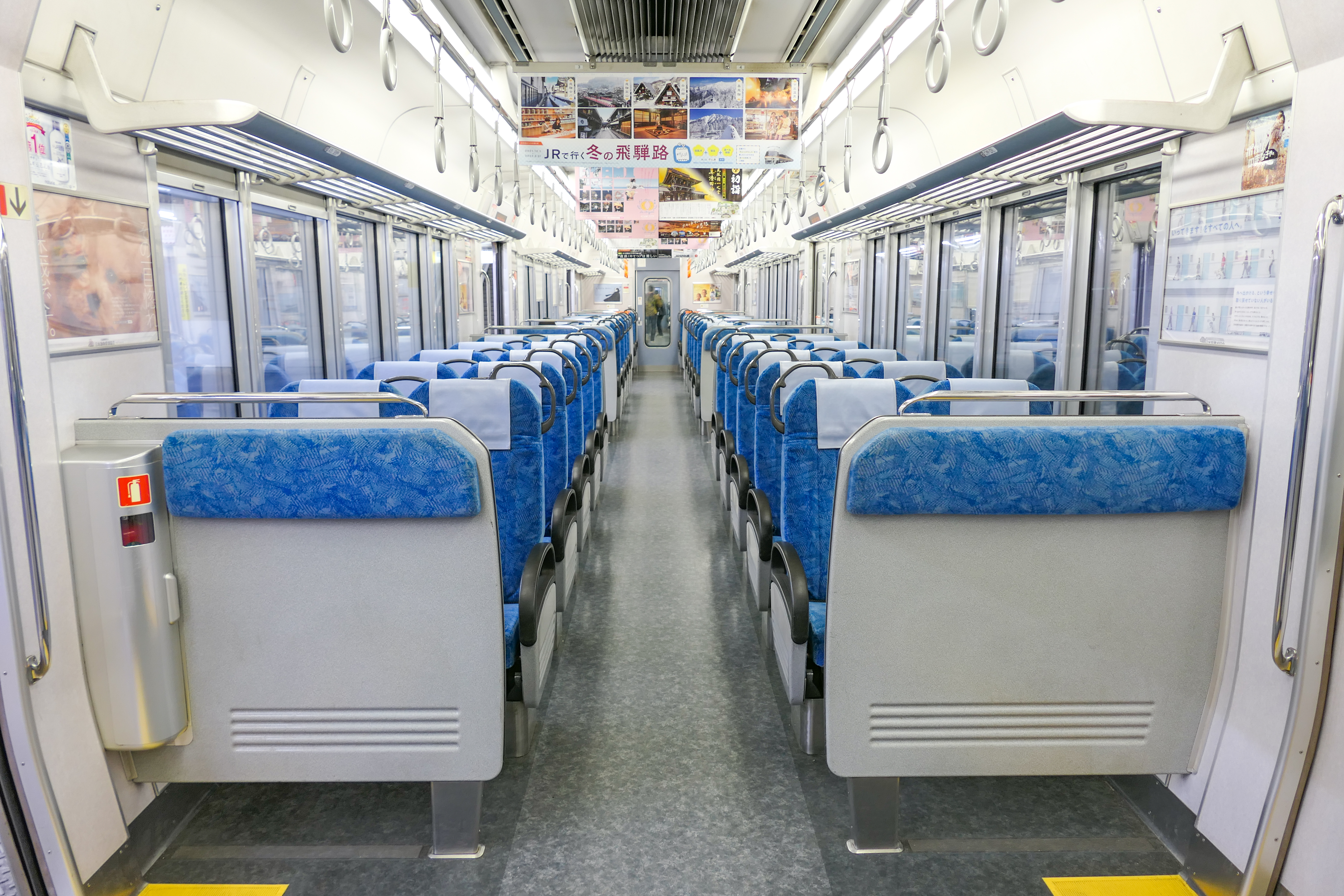
313-5000 series interior view, January 2022

== 313-5300 series ==
One 2-car 4th-batch set was delivered in July 2010 with flip-over transverse seating.

=== 2-car Ōgaki set Z1 ===
Designation	Mc	Tc'
Numbering	KuMoHa 313-5300	KuHa 312-5000

== 313-8000 series ==
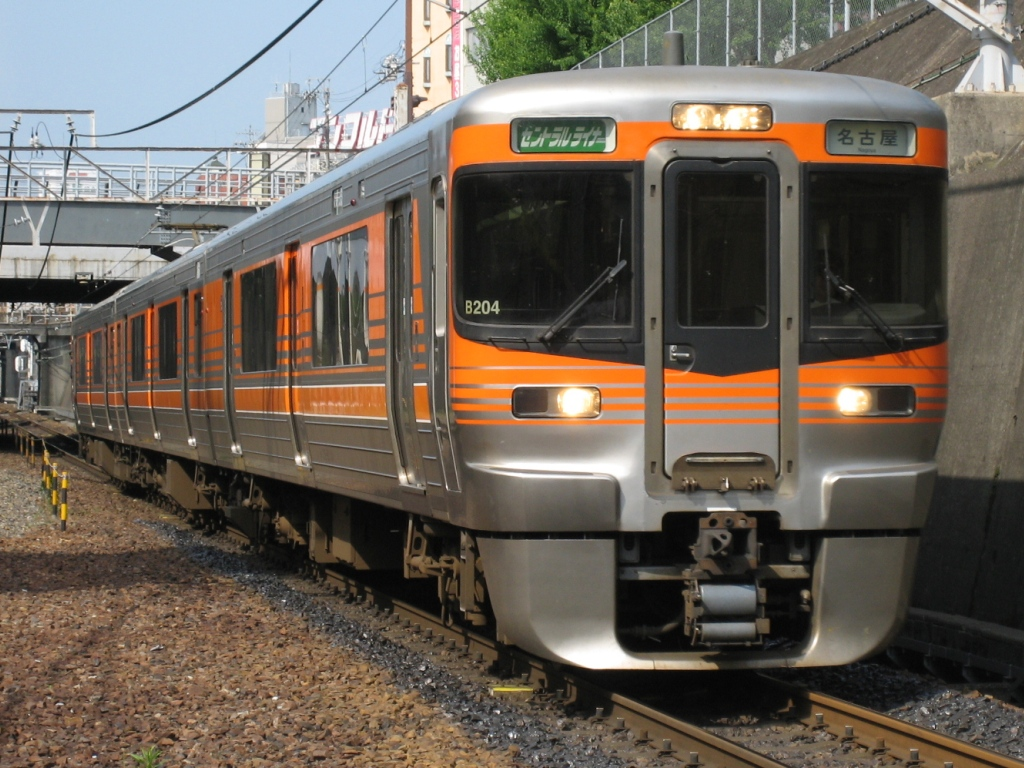
313-8000 series

The 313-8000 series fleet consists of six 3-car sets (18 vehicles) with flip-over transverse seating, designed for use on Chūō Main Line Central Liner and Home Liner Nakatsugawa services and built by Kinki Sharyo and Nippon Sharyo between September 1999 and February 2001. Although Central Liner services were discontinued in 2013, the trains continued to be used on Chūō Main Line local and rapid services until JR Central's 12 March 2022 timetable revision, and were transferred from Jinryō to Shizuoka depot from then. The sets were renumbered S1–S6 from B201–B206. From 14 March of that year, the fleet was introduced onto Tōkaidō Main Line services.

=== 3-car Shizuoka sets S1 to S6 ===
Designation	Mc	M	Tc'
Numbering	KuMoHa 313-8500	MoHa 313-8500	KuHa 312-8000

=== Interior ===
Passenger accommodation consists of flip-over transverse seating throughout. Fixed seating bays with tables are provided at the ends of each car. Some cars are equipped with toilets.

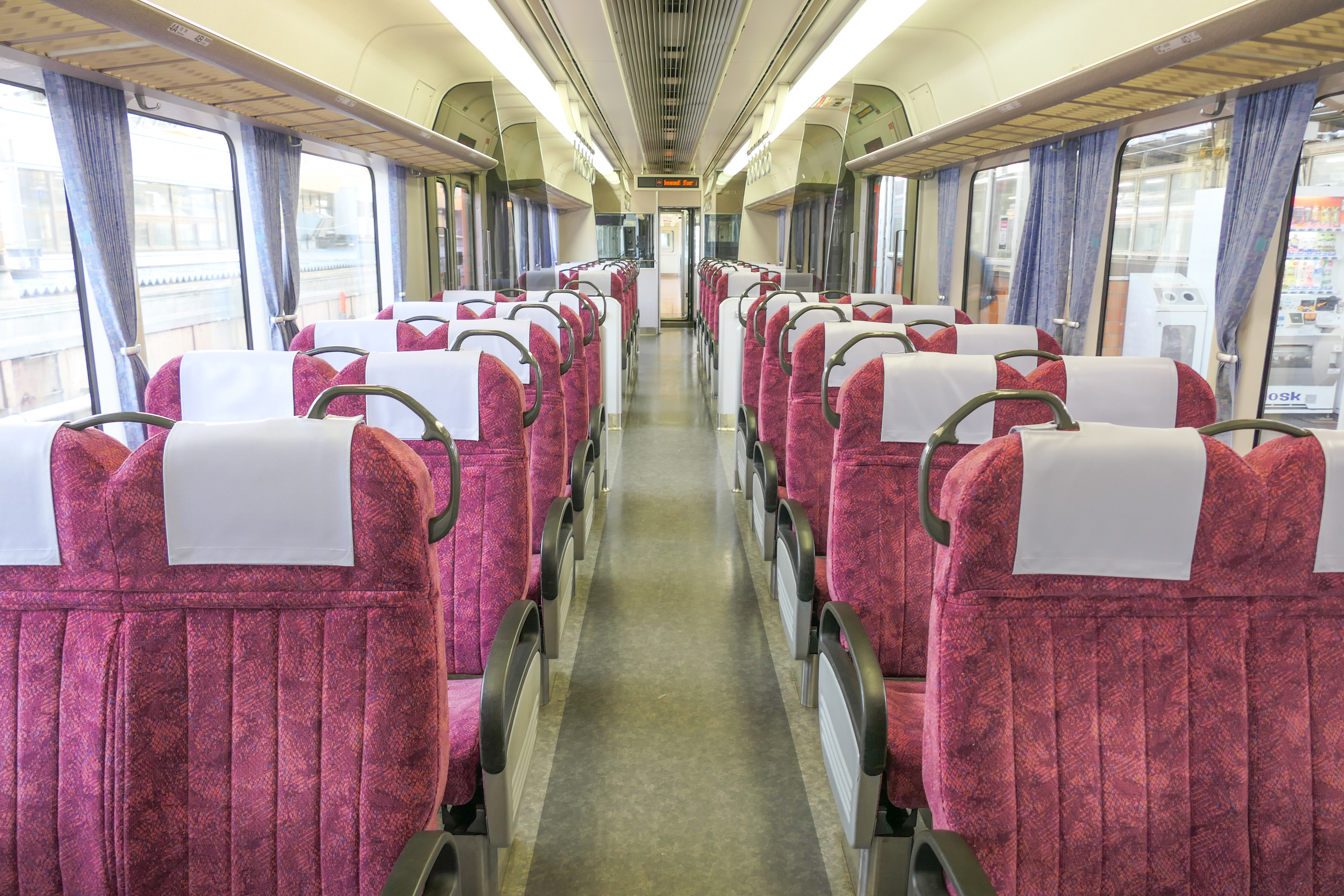
Interior view

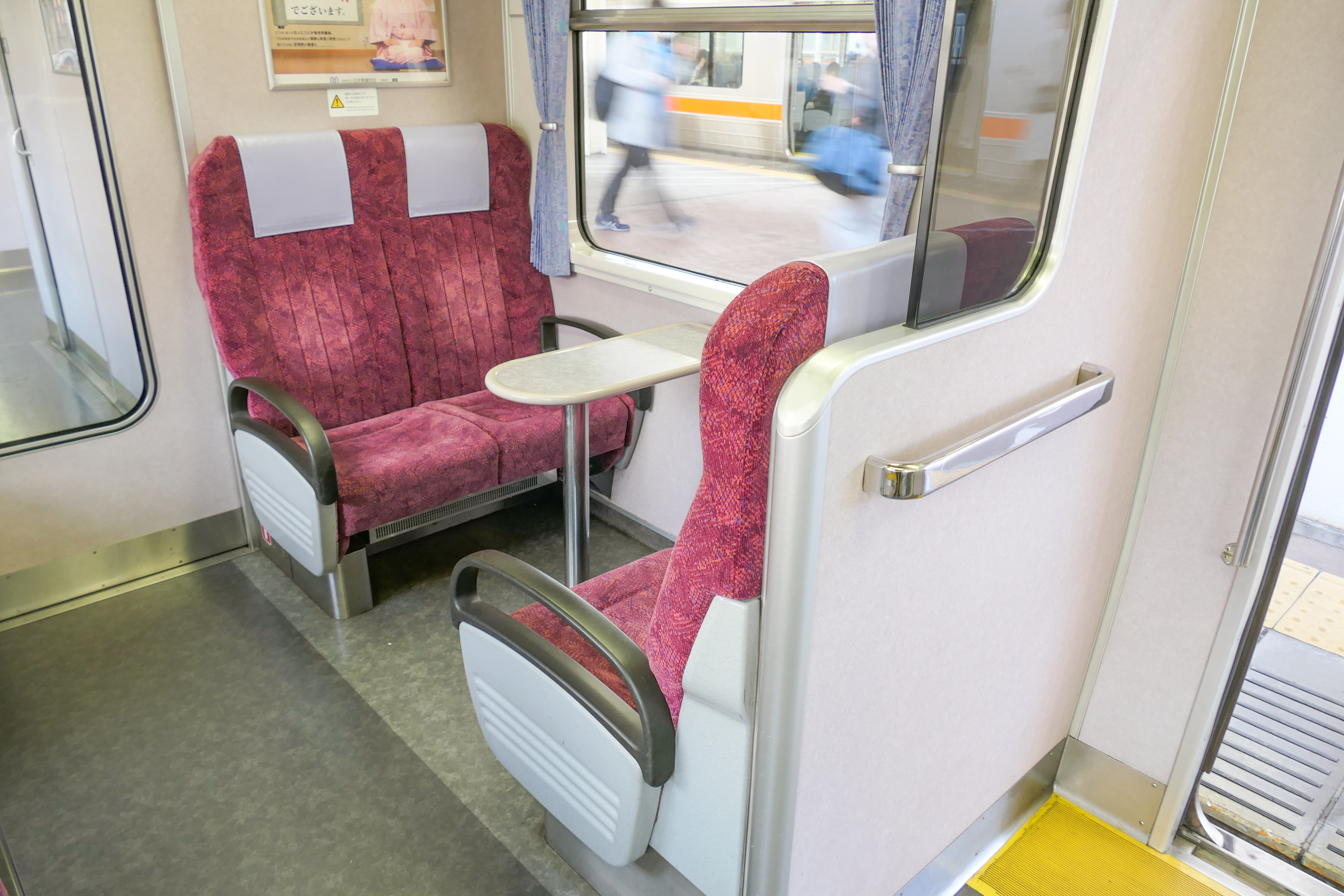
End-car transverse seating bay

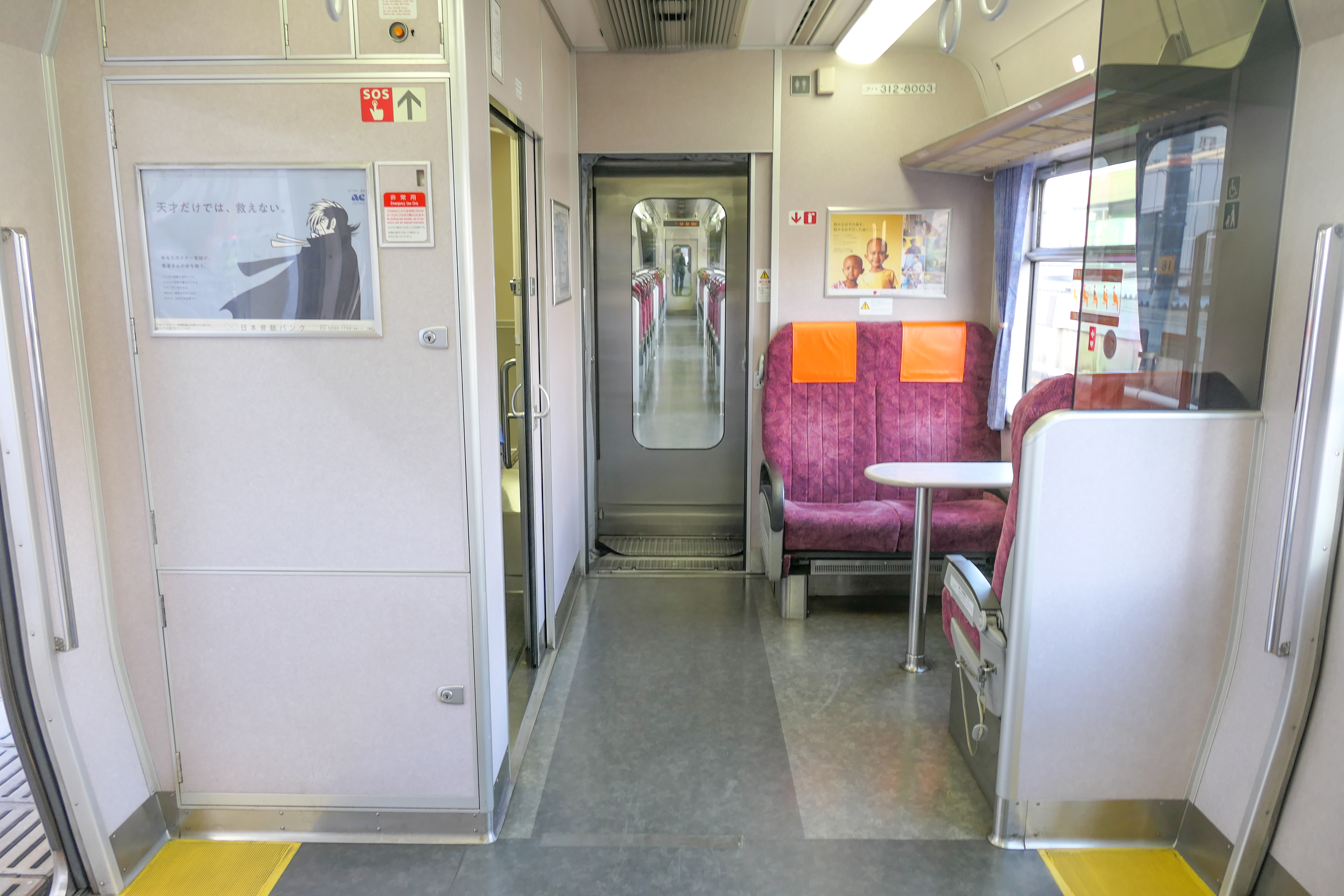
Priority seating with toilet

== See also ==
- KiHa 25, diesel multiple unit counterpart
