= Echizen Railway 7000 series =

Japanese DC electric multiple unit train type

7000 series
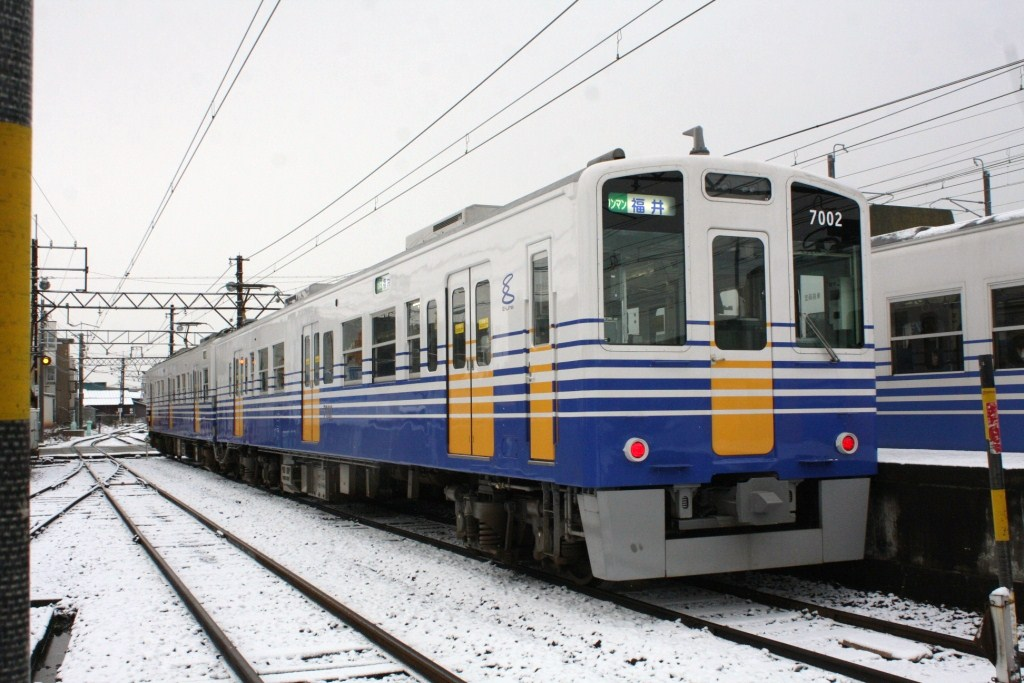
- The first set in service, February 2013
- Stock type: Electric multiple unit
- In service: February 2013 –
- Replaced: 1101 series 2101 series 2201 series
- Constructed: 1982–1983 (As 119 series)
- Number built: 12 vehicles (6 sets)
- Number in service: 12 vehicles (6 sets)
- Formation: 2 cars per trainset
- Operator: Echizen Railway
- Line served: Mikuni Awara line

Specifications
- Car body construction: Steel
- Car length: 20,000 mm (65 ft 7 in)
- Width: 2,832 mm (9 ft 3.5 in)
- Height: 3,935 mm (12 ft 10.9 in)
- Doors: 3 pairs per side
- Traction system: Mitsubishi IGBT-VVVF
- Electric system: 600 V DC
- Current collection: Overhead catenary
- Track gauge: 1,067 mm (3 ft 6 in)

The 7000 series (7000形) is a DC electric multiple unit (EMU) train type operated in Japan by the third sector railway operator Echizen Railway since February 2013. Converted from former 119 series EMUs operated by JR Central until 2012, a total of six 2-car sets are scheduled to be introduced between fiscal 2012 and 2013, replacing the older 1101 series, 2101 series, and 2201 series trains.

== Design ==
The 7000 series trains were converted from former 119 series 2-car EMUs operated by JR Central on the Iida Line until they were withdrawn from service in March 2012. Modifications included the following changes:

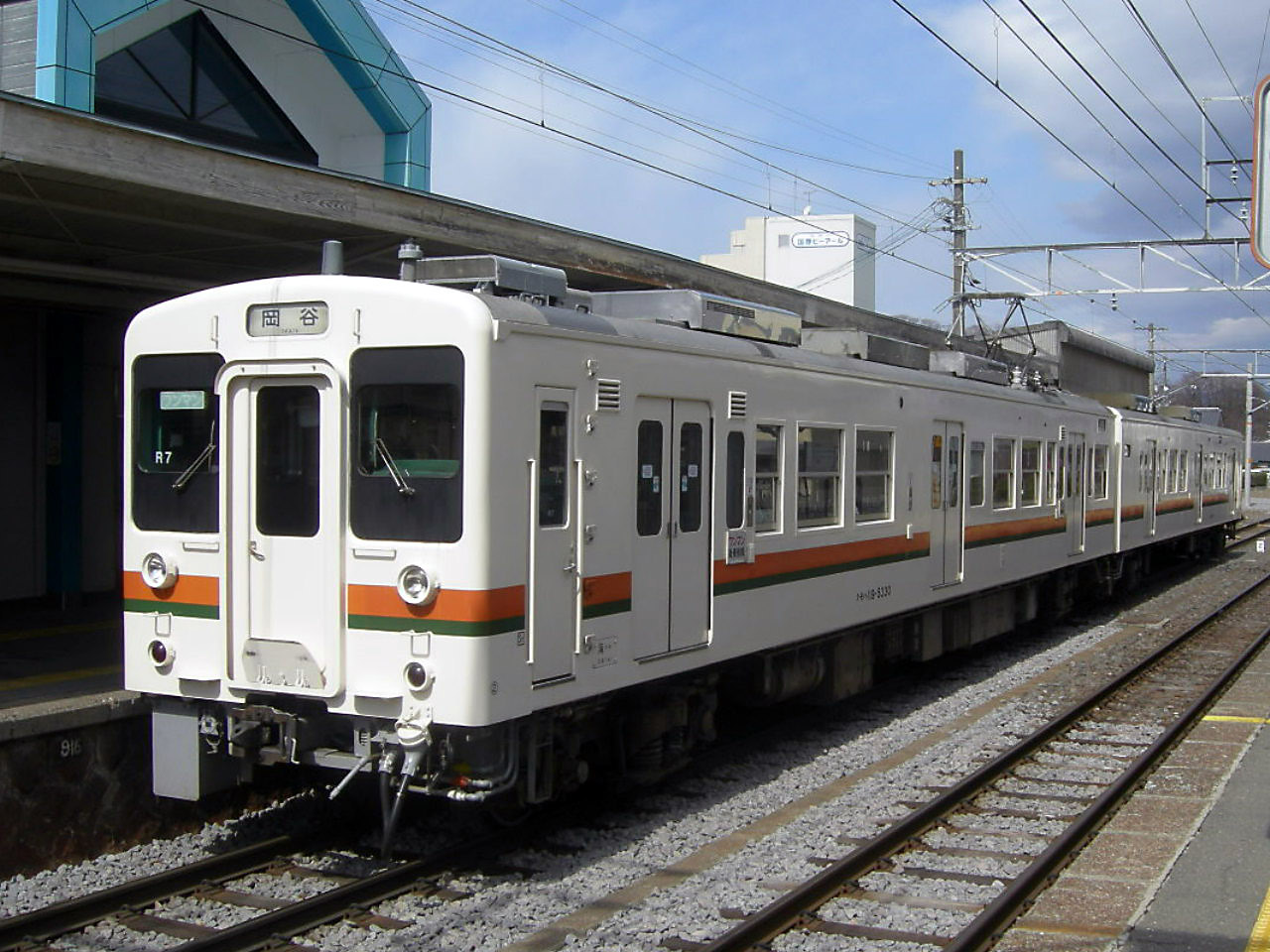
A JR Central 119-5300 series set, March 2008

- Removal of front-end gangway connections
- Addition of new headlights above the cab-end centre doors
- Addition of front-end skirts
- Addition of single-arm pantographs
- Removal of toilets
- Repainting into the standard Echizen Railway livery

== Formations ==
As of 1 April 2013, three two-car sets are in service, formed as follows, with one motored driving (Mc) car and one non-powered driving trailer (Tc) car.

Designation	Mc	Tc
Numbering	MoHa 7000	KuHa 7000

The MoHa 7000 cars are fitted with two single-arm pantographs.

== Interior ==
Passenger accommodation retains the original mixture of longitudinal bench seating and transverse 4-seat bays used in the 119 series. The toilet originally fitted to the KuHa car has been removed.

== History ==
The first set, 7001 + 7002 entered service on 4 February 2013, the second set, 7003 + 7004, entered service on 3 March 2013, and the third set, 7005 + 7006, entered service on 18 March 2013. Three more two-car sets were scheduled to be introduced in fiscal 2013.

On 2 March 2025, the second set collided with a falling rock near Hishima Station, damaging and derailing car 7003.

== Build details ==
Set No.	Car No.	Original JR number	Entry into service
1	MoHa 7001	KuMoHa 119-5318	4 February 2013
1	KuHa 7002	KuHa 118-5311	4 February 2013
2	MoHa 7003	KuMoHa 119-5330	3 March 2013
2	KuHa 7004	KuHa 118-5322	3 March 2013
3	MoHa 7005		18 March 2013
3	KuHa 7006		18 March 2013
4	MoHa 7007		
4	KuHa 7008		
5	MoHa 7009		
5	KuHa 7010		
6	MoHa 7011		
6	KuHa 7012		
