= S7000 =

S7000 may refer to:

- EV-S7000, a Hi8 VCR
- Fujifilm FinePix S7000, a 6.3 megapixels digital camera
- Saipem 7000, a 1986 crane vessel, the second largest in the world

== See also ==
- S7000A, property tax law in New York City
