= 225 series =

Japanese train type

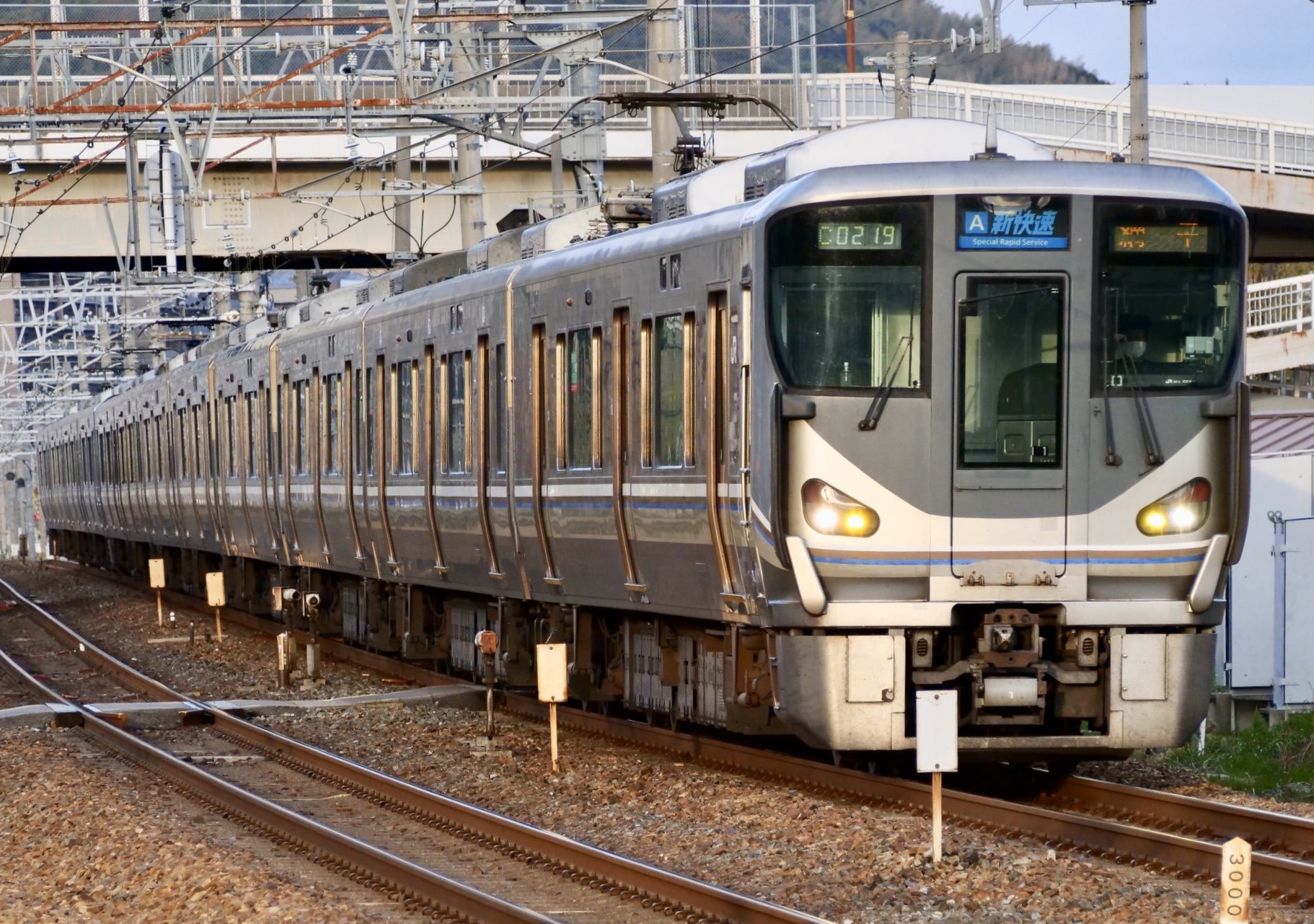
- The first 225-0 series unit delivered, January 2019
- Manufacturers: Kawasaki Heavy Industries, Kinki Sharyo
- Replaced: 103 series, 113 series, 117 series, 205 series, 221 series
- Constructed: 2010–2012, 2016–2017, 2020–
- Entered service: 1 December 2010
- Refurbished: 2012
- Number under construction: 144 vehicles on order
- Number built: 480 vehicles (as of 2023)
- Number in service: 472 vehicles (as for 2023)
- Formation: 8/6/4 cars per trainset
- Operator: JR-West
- Depots: Aboshi, Hineno, Miyahara
- Lines served: A Tōkaidō Main Line; A Sanyō Main Line; A Hokuriku Main Line; A Akō Line; B Kosei Line; O Osaka Loop Line; R Hanwa Line; S Kansai Airport Line; W Kisei Main Line; G Fukuchiyama Line

Specifications
- Car body construction: Stainless steel
- Car length: 19.57 m (64 ft 2 in) (end cars); 19.5 m (64 ft 0 in) (intermediate cars)
- Width: 2,950 mm (9 ft 8 in)
- Floor height: 1,120 mm (3 ft 8 in)
- Doors: 2 per side (225-700 series); 3 pairs per side (all other subseries)
- Maximum speed: 130 km/h (81 mph) (225-0/100/700 series); 120 km/h (75 mph) (225-5000/5100/6000 series)
- Traction system: Variable frequency (2-level IGBT)
- Acceleration: 2.5 km/(h⋅s) (1.55 mph/s)
- Deceleration: Normal:4.6 km/(h⋅s) (2.86 mph/s); Emergency: 5.2 km/(h⋅s) (3.23 mph/s)
- Electric system: 1,500 V DC Overhead
- Current collection: WPS28C single-arm pantograph (225-0/5000/6000 series); WPS28E single-arm pantograph (225-100/700/5100 series)
- Bogies: WDT63 (powered), WTR246B/WTR246C (trailer)(225-0/6000 series); WDT63A (powered), WTR246D/WTR246E (trailer)(225-5000 series)
- Braking systems: Regenerative brake, electronically controlled pneumatic brakes, snow-resistant brake, parking brake
- Safety systems: ATS-SW2, ATS-P3; Dead man's switch (225-5100 series)
- Multiple working: 221/223 series
- Seating: 2+2 transverse
- Track gauge: 1,067 mm (3 ft 6 in)

The 225 series (225系, 225-kei) is a DC electric multiple unit (EMU) train type operated by West Japan Railway Company (JR-West) on suburban services in the "Keihanshin" Kyoto-Osaka-Kobe area since December 2010.

== Design ==
226 vehicles were ordered, at a cost of approximately 30 billion yen. The trains incorporate increased front-end crash protection with the inclusion of crushable zones.

== Variants ==
- 225–0 series
- 225–100 series
- 225–700 series
- 225–5000 series
- 225–5100 series
- 225–6000 series

The total order of 226 vehicles consists of 110 225–0 series vehicles with a maximum speed of 130 km/h (81 mph) for use on Tokaido Main Line and Sanyo Main Line Special Rapid services and 116 225–5000 series vehicles with a maximum speed of 120 km/h (75 mph) for use on the Hanwa Line. Livery for each is identical to that of the 223 series vehicles on each of these routes.

The first 225–100 series second-batch sets were delivered in early 2016, formed as four-, six- and eight-car units. These were followed by 225–5100 series second-batch sets, also delivered in early 2016, formed as four- and six-car sets.

== Operations ==
=== 225-0/100 series ===
- Tokaido Main Line (Biwako Line, JR Kyoto Line, JR Kobe Line) (Maibara – Kobe)
- Sanyo Main Line (JR Kobe Line) (Kōbe – Kamigōri)
- Hokuriku Main Line (Biwako Line) (Tsuruga – Maibara)
- Kosei Line (through services from Hokuriku Main Line)
- Kusatsu Line
- Akō Line (Aioi – Banshū-Akō)

=== 225-700 series (4 cars) ===
- Tokaido Main Line (Biwako Line, JR Kyoto Line, JR Kobe Line) (Yasu – Kobe)
- Sanyo Main Line (JR Kobe Line) (Aboshi – Kobe)

=== 225-5000/5100 series (4 cars) ===
- Osaka Loop Line
- Hanwa Line (through services from Kansai Airport Line)
- Kansai Airport Line
- Kisei Main Line (Kinokuni Line) (Wakayama – Kii-Tanabe)

=== 225-5100 series (6 cars) ===
- Hanwa Line

=== 225-6000 series ===
- Tokaido Main Line (JR Kobe Line) (Ōsaka – Amagasaki)
- Fukuchiyama Line (JR Takarazuka Line) (Amagasaki – Sasayamaguchi or Fukuchiyama)

== Formations ==
=== 225-0 series ===
The 225–0 series sets are formed as eight-car and four-car sets, as follows.

==== 8-car sets ====
Car No.	1	2	3	4	5	6	7	8
Designation	M'c	M3	M'		M5	M'		Mc
Numbering	KuMoHa 224	MoHa 225-300	MoHa 224		MoHa 225-500	MoHa 224		KuMoHa 225
Capacity	126	144						133
Weight	41.8 t	39.5 t	38.6 t		39.0 t	38.6 t		41.6 t

Cars 2, 5 and 8 are each fitted with one WPS28C single-arm pantograph.

==== 4-car sets ====
Car No.	1	2	3	4
Designation	M'c	M	M'	Mc
Numbering	KuMoHa 224	MoHa 225	MoHa 224	KuMoHa 225

Cars 2 and 4 are each fitted with one WPS28C single-arm pantograph.

=== 225-100 series ===
The 225–100 series sets are formed as eight-car, six-car and four-car sets, as follows.

==== 8-car sets ====
Car No.	1	2	3	4	5	6	7	8
Numbering	KuMoHa 224-1xx	MoHa 225-4xx	MoHa 224-1xx		MoHa 225-6xx	MoHa 224-1xx		KuMoHa 225-1xx

Car 2 has two WPS28E single-arm pantographs, while Cars 5 and 8 each have one.

==== 6-car sets ====
Car No.	1	2	3	4	5	6
Designation	M'c	M'	M	M'		Mc
Numbering	KuMoHa 224-1xx	MoHa 224-1xx	MoHa 225-1xx	MoHa 224-1xx		KuMoHa 225-1xx

Car 3 has two WPS28E single-arm pantographs, while Car 6 has one.

==== 4-car sets ====
Car No.	1	2	3	4
Numbering	KuMoHa 224-1xx	MoHa 225-1xx	MoHa 224-1xx	KuMoHa 225-1xx

Car 2 has two WPS28E single-arm pantographs, while Car 4 has one.

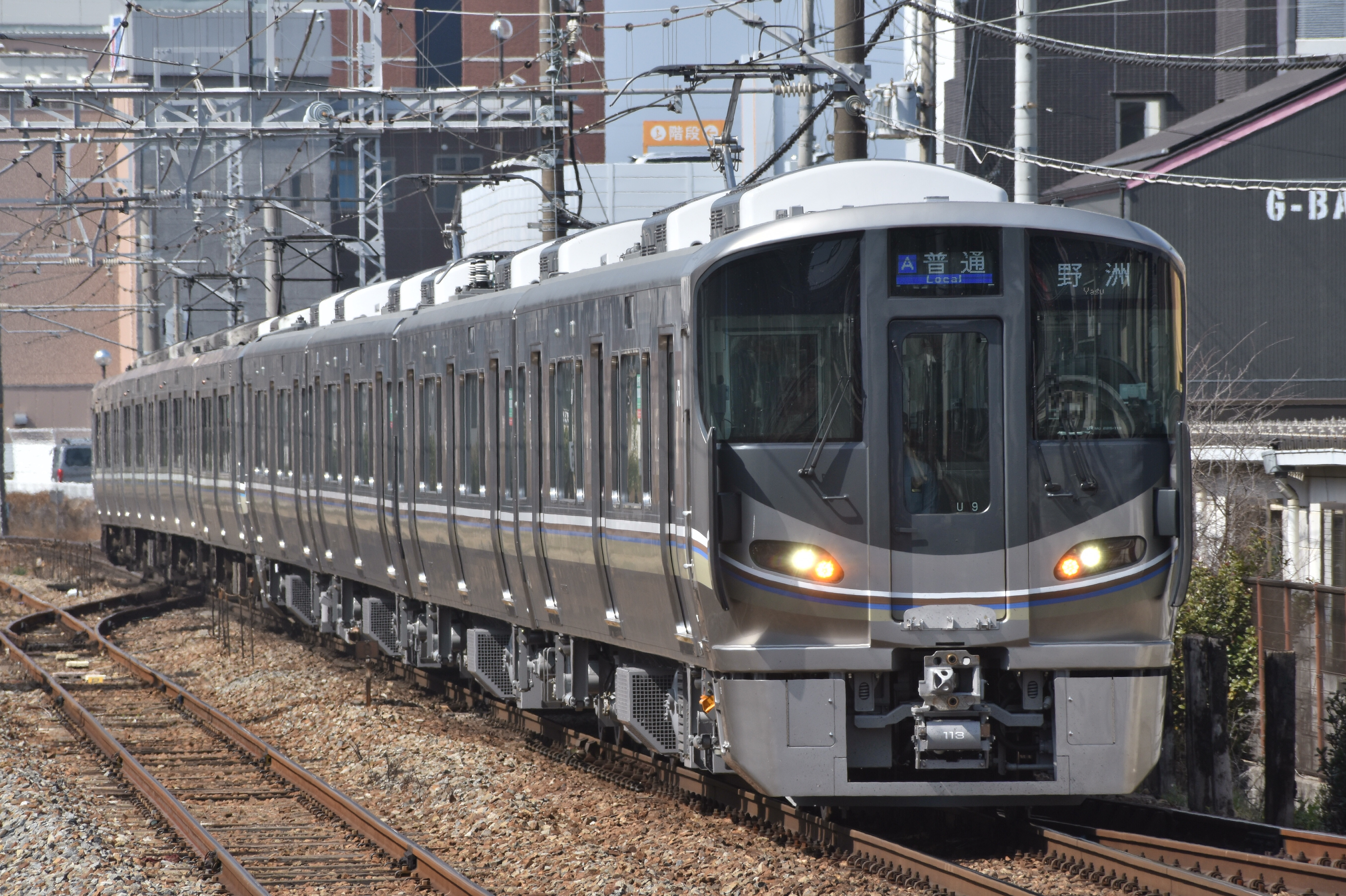
225-100 series 4-car set U9 leading an 8-car train in March 2021

=== 225-700 series ===
The 225–700 series sets are formed as four-car sets, as follows.

Car No.	1	2	3	4
Numbering	KuMoHa 224-7xx	MoHa 225-1xx	MoHa 224-1xx	KuMoHa 225-1xx

Car 2 has two WPS28E single-arm pantographs, while Car 4 has one.

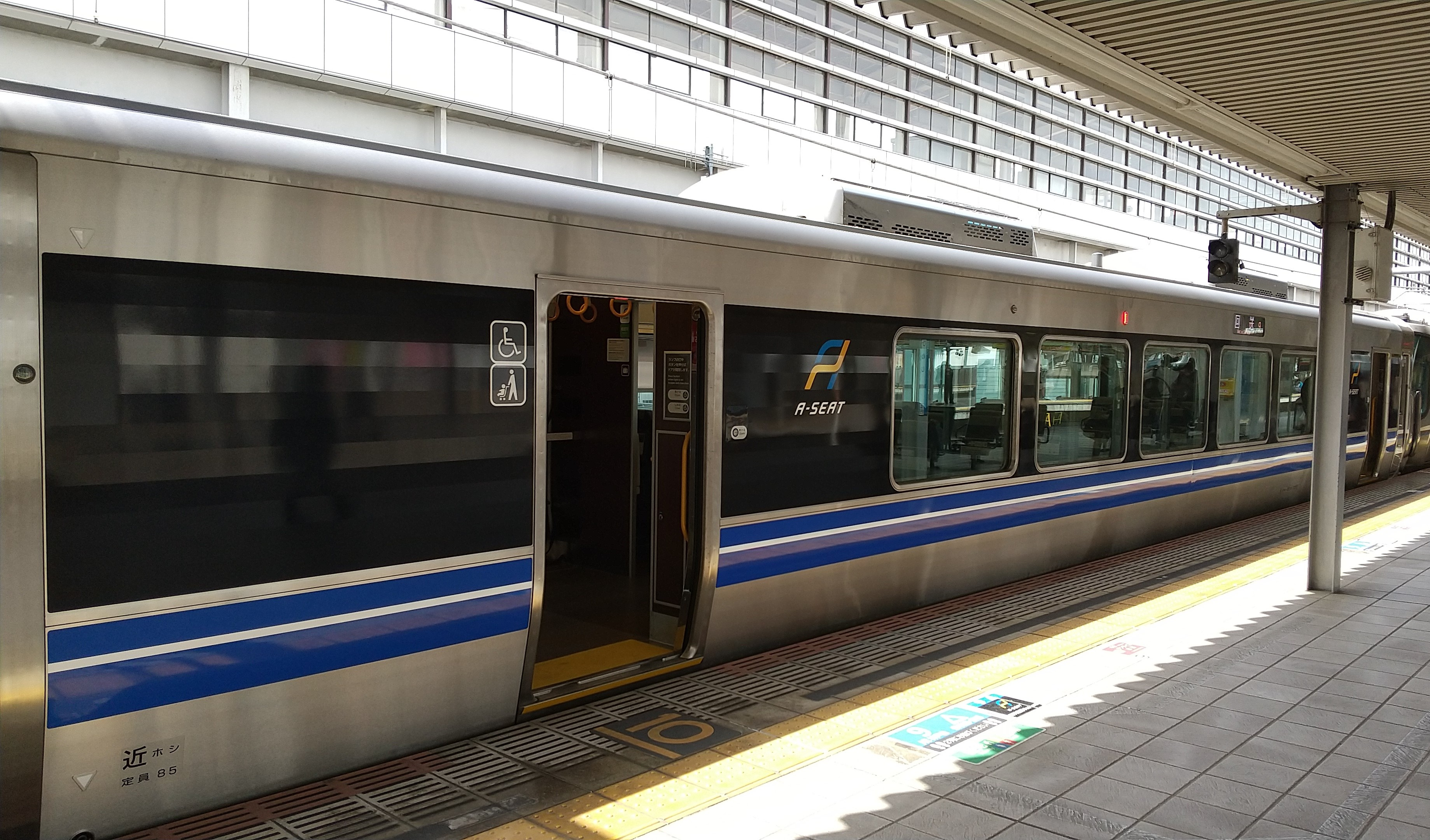
225-700 series KuMoHa 224–701, April 2023

=== 225-5000 series ===
The 225–5000 series sets are formed as follows.

Car No.	1	2	3	4
Designation	M'c	M	M'	Mc
Numbering	KuMoHa 224-5000	MoHa 225-5000	MoHa 224-5000	KuMoHa 225–5000

Cars 2 and 4 are each fitted with one WPS28C single-arm pantograph.

=== 225-5100 series ===
The 225–5100 series sets are formed as six-car and four-car sets, as follows.

==== 6-car sets ====
Car No.	1	2	3	4	5	6
Designation	M'c	M'	M	M'	M'	Mc
Numbering	KuMoHa 224-51xx	MoHa 224-51xx	MoHa 225-51xx	MoHa 224-51xx	MoHa 224-51xx	KuMoHa 225-51xx

Car 3 has two WPS28E single-arm pantographs, while Car 6 has one.

==== 4-car sets ====
Car No.	1	2	3	4
Designation	M'c	M	M'	Mc
Numbering	KuMoHa 224-51xx	MoHa 225-51xx	MoHa 224-51xx	KuMoHa 225-51xx

Car 2 has two WPS28E single-arm pantographs, while Car 4 has one.

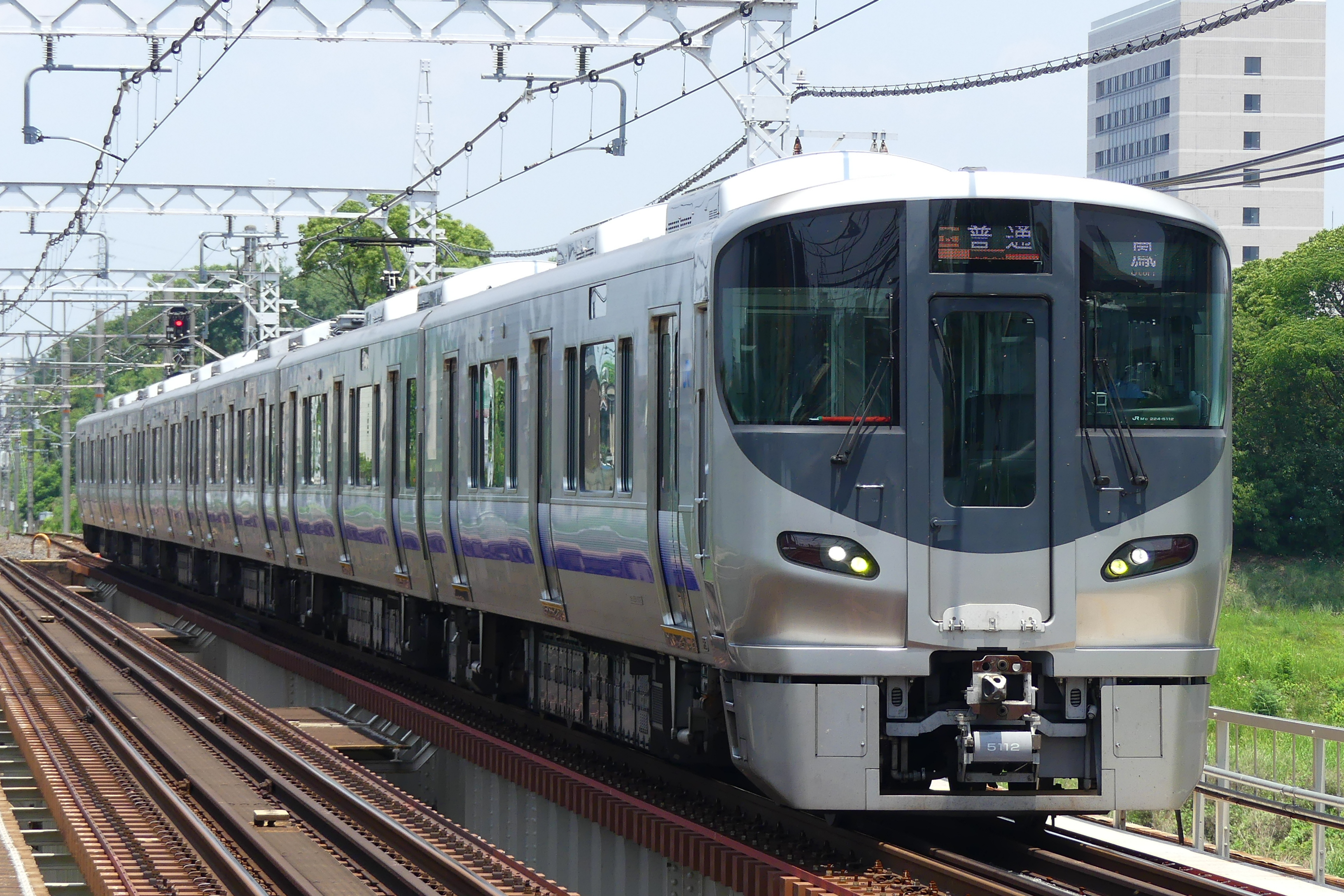
A six-car 225–5100 series set in July 2017

=== 225-6000 series ===
The 225–6000 series sets are formed as six-car and four-car sets, as follows.

==== 6-car sets ====
Car No.	1	2	3	4	5	6
Designation	M'c	M'	M	M'		Mc
Numbering	KuMoHa 224-6000	MoHa 224-6000	MoHa 225-6000	MoHa 224-6000		KuMoHa 225–6000

Cars 3 and 6 are each fitted with one WPS28C single-arm pantograph.

==== 4-car sets ====
Car No.	1	2	3	4
Designation	M'c	M	M'	Mc
Numbering	KuMoHa 224-6000	MoHa 225-6000	MoHa 224-6000	KuMoHa 225–6000

Cars 2 and 4 are each fitted with one WPS28C single-arm pantograph.

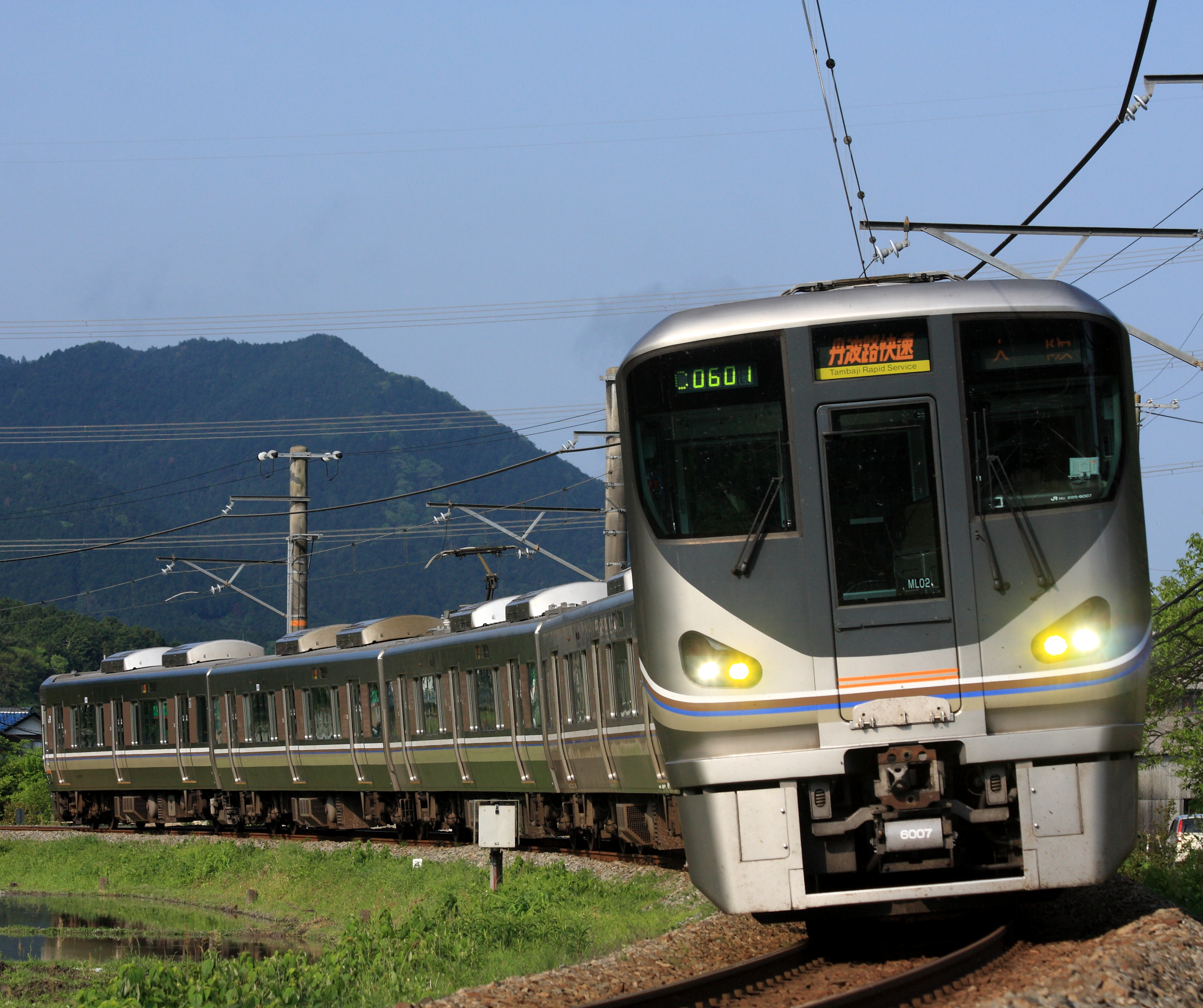
225-6000 series 6-car sets on Tanbaji Rapid Service in May 2012

== Interior ==
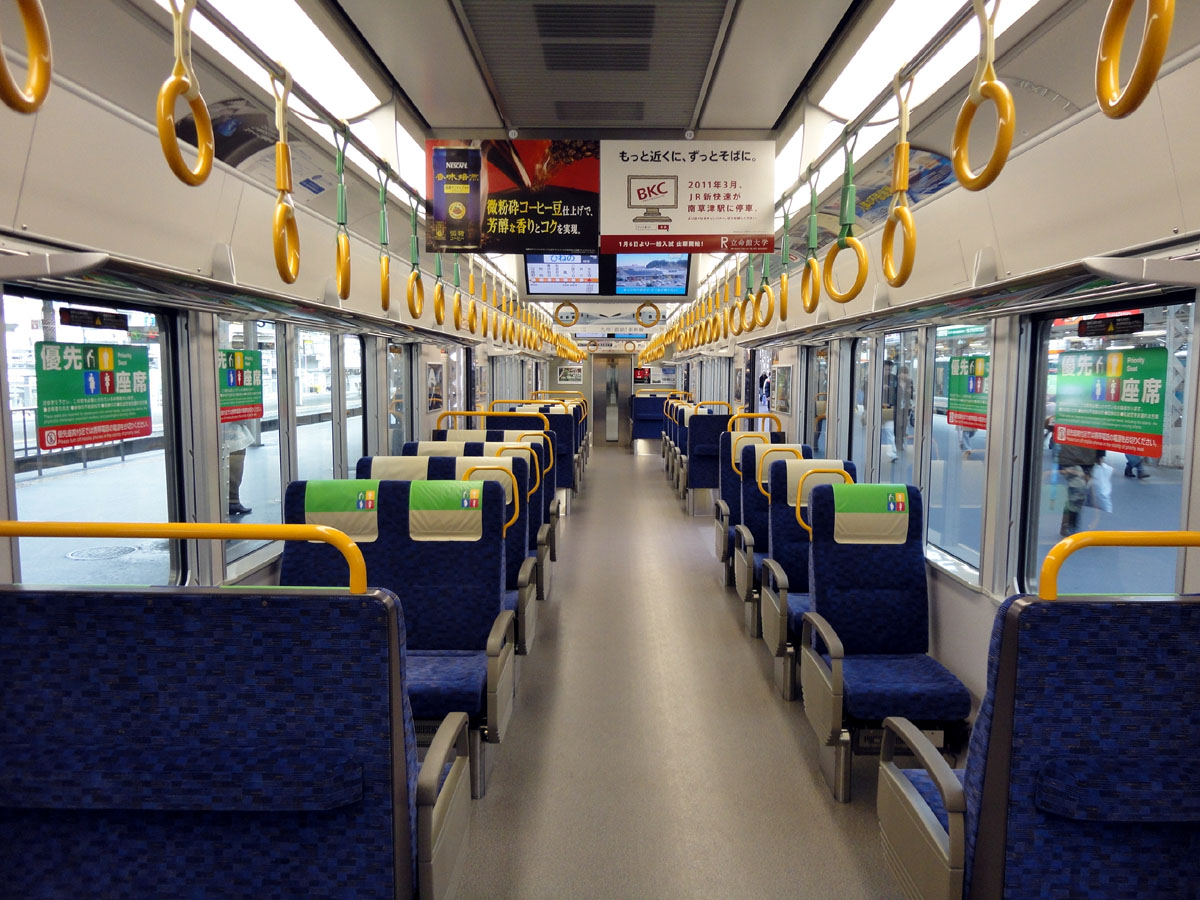
General interior view, January 2011

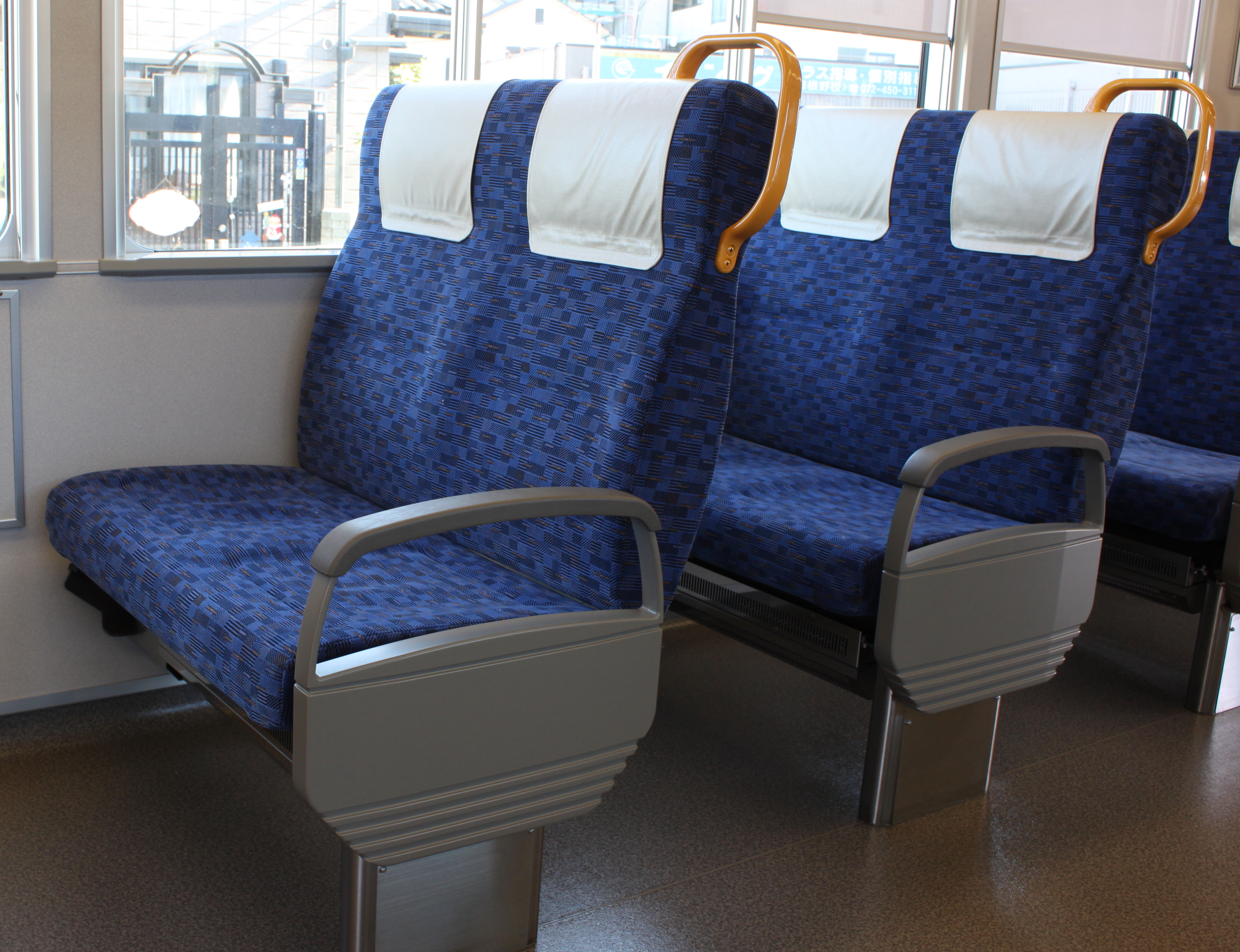
2-abreast flip-over seats, December 2010

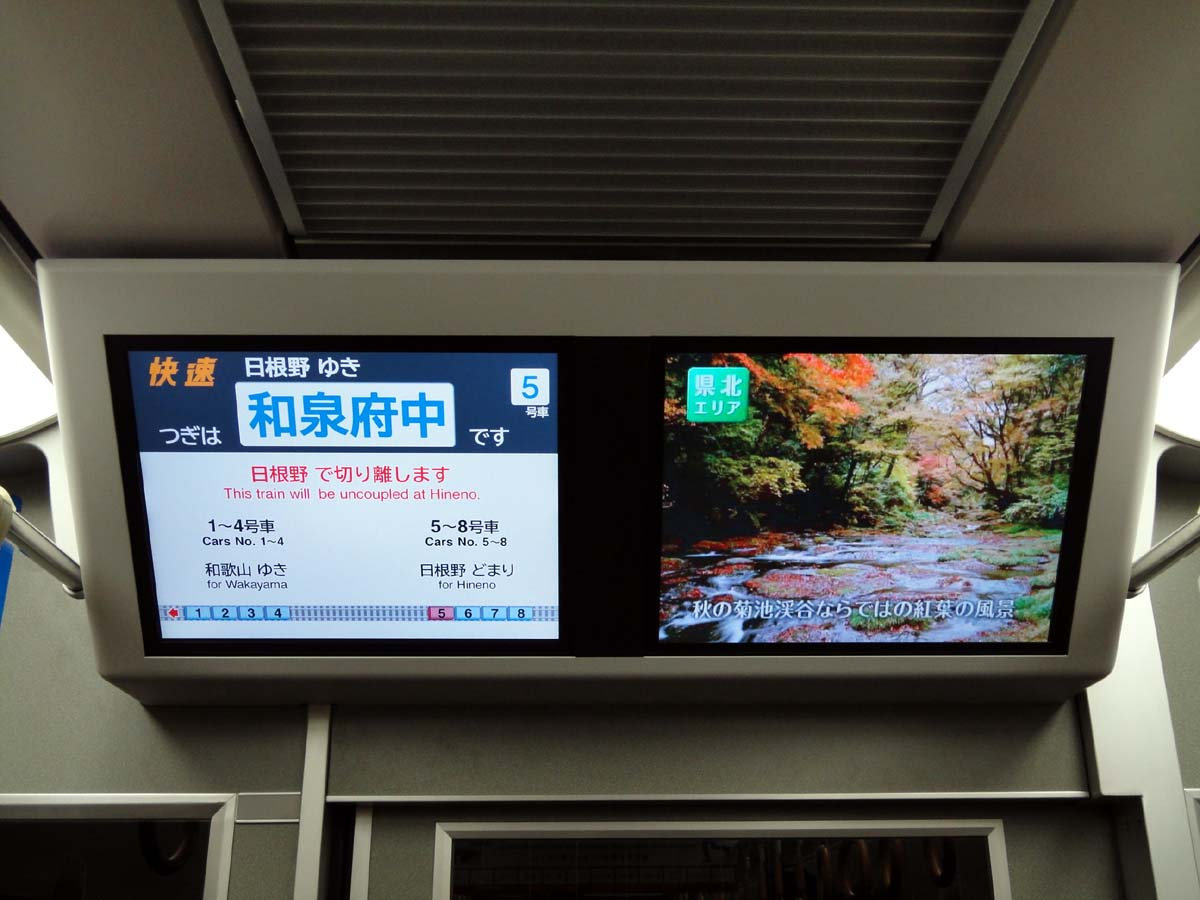
LCD passenger information display

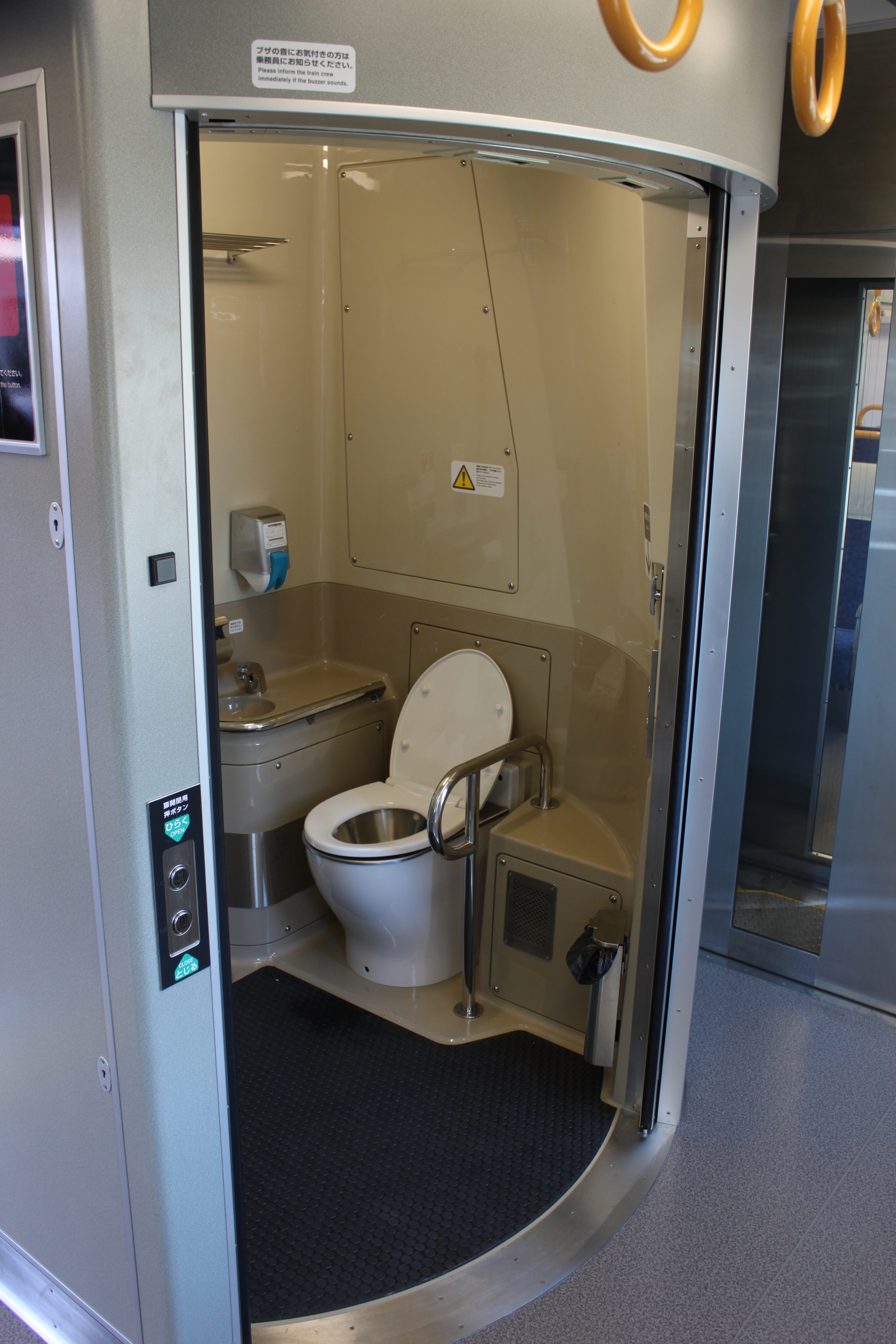
Wheelchair-accessible toilet, December 2010

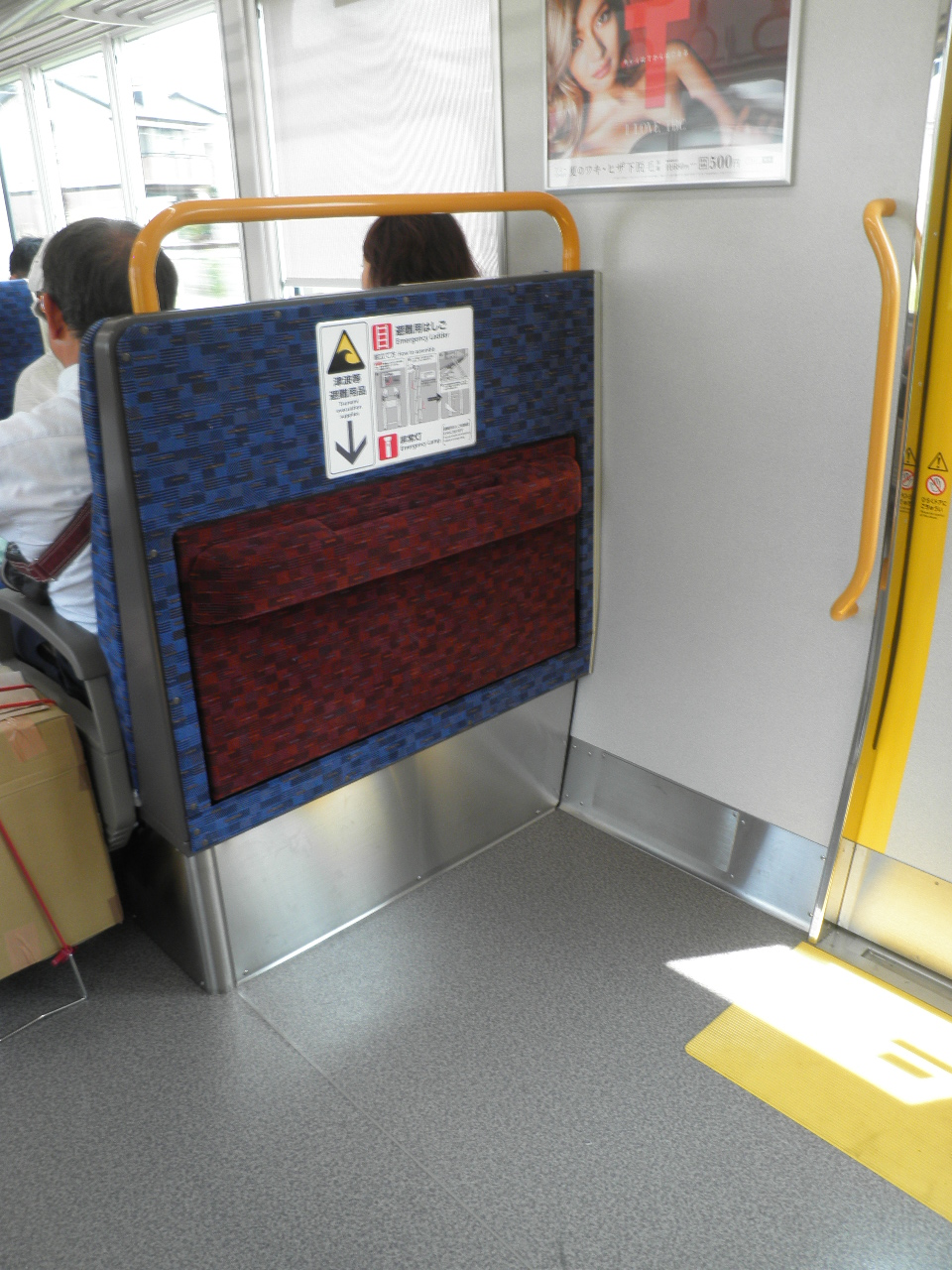
An emergency ladder stowage box inside a 225–5100 series set

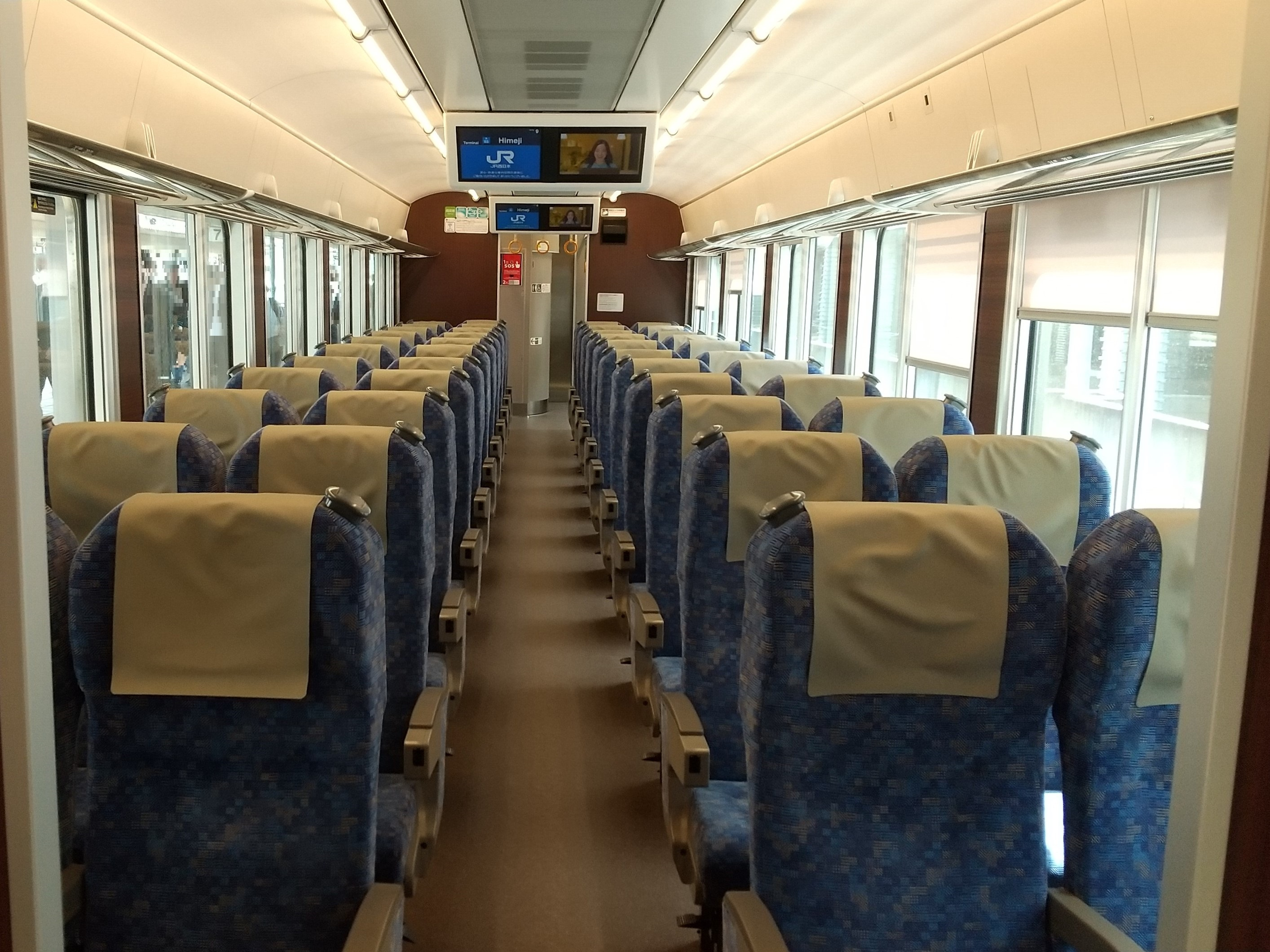
225-700 series interior view, April 2023

== History ==
The first 225–0 series 8-car train was delivered from Kinki Sharyo on 18 May 2010. The first pair of 225–5000 series 4-car trains was delivered from Kinki Sharyo on 7 September 2010.

Both the 225-0 and 225–5000 series entered revenue service from 1 December 2010.

The unvelling of a new 225–700 series set took place on 18 January 2023. Intended for expansion of the current "A-Seat" paid reserved seating program rolled out on 223–1000 series sets, the new 4-car sets feature an end car which is equipped with Wi-Fi, 2 + 2 abreast seating, a washroom, and two single sliding doors per side (differing from the "A-Seat" cars on the 223–1000 series trainsets which feature three pairs of doors per side). The sets are expected to begin revenue service on the 18 March 2023 timetable revision when the "A-Seat" program is expanded on special rapid services on the Tokaido and San'yo main lines. As of 30 January 2023, two sets have been delivered and have since been undergoing testing and driver training.
