= 113 series =

Japanese train type

113 series 111 series
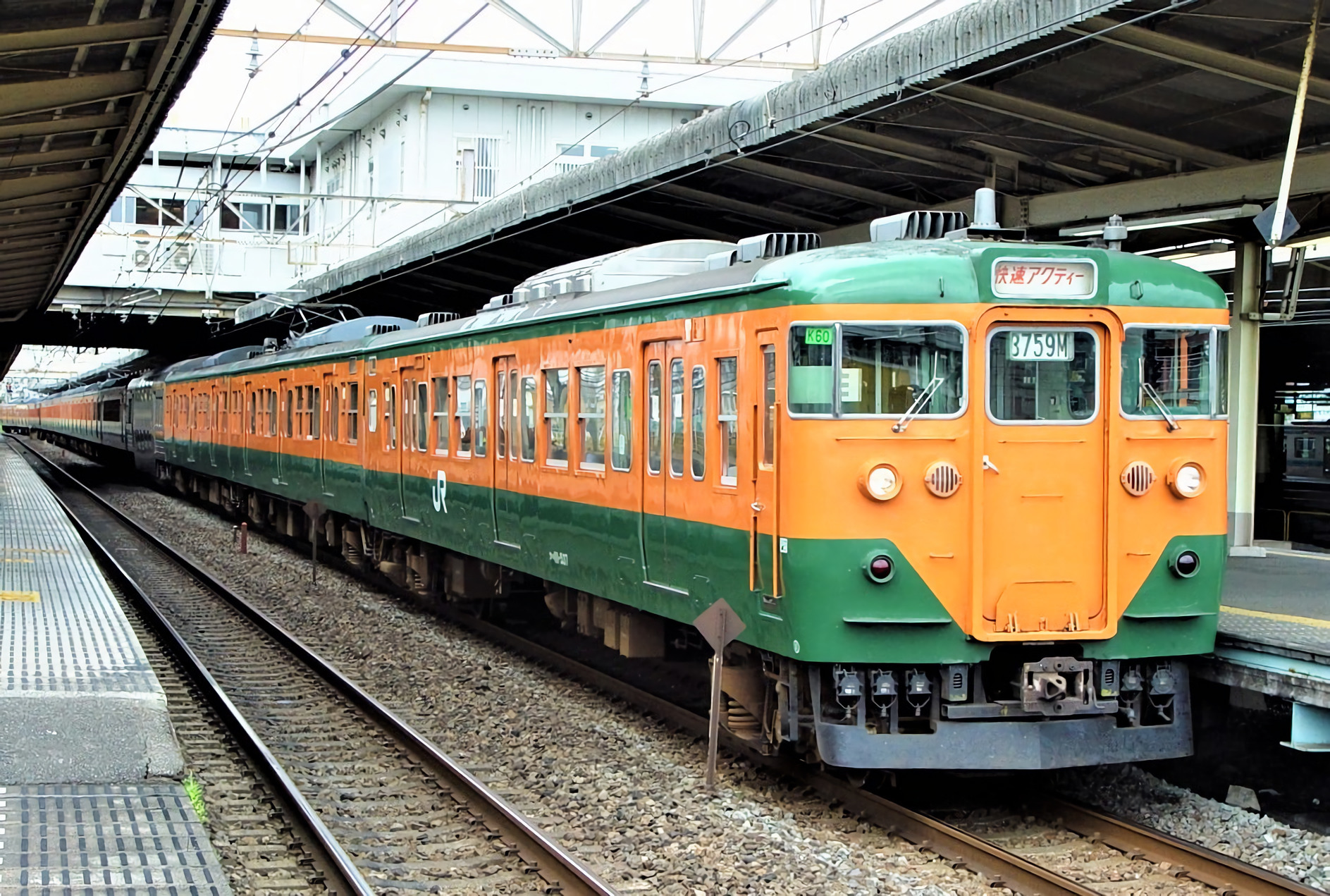
- JR-East 15-car set on a Tōkaidō Main Line service, June 2003
- In service: 1962–2001 (111 series); 1963–present (113 series)
- Manufacturers: JNR Niitsu Works, Hitachi, Kawasaki Heavy Industries, Kinki Sharyo, Kisha Seizo, Nippon Sharyo, Teikoku Sharyo, Tokyu Car Corporation
- Replaced: 70 series, 80 series
- Constructed: 1962–1963 (111 series); 1963–1982 & 1989 (113 series)
- Entered service: 1962 (111 series); February 1964 (113 series)
- Refurbished: 1998– (for selected 113 series trains)
- Number built: 30 vehicles (111 series); 2,977 vehicles (113 series)
- Number in service: 111 series: None; 113 series: 112 vehicles (JR West) (as of April 2023)
- Number scrapped: 2,829 vehicles
- Successor: 117 series, 211 series, E217 series, 221 series, 223 series, 225 series, E231-1000 series, 311 series, 313 series
- Fleet numbers: 111 series: S37 – S38; 113 series: 51, 53, 101 – 119, 201 – 218, 220, 236, B01 – B13, F13, K1 – K17, K41 – K76, N1 – N9, P01, P03, P05, P07 – P08, P14, S1 – S14, S33, S61 – S71, S77, S99, S221 – S225, W41 – W43, W46, Y1 – Y14, Y21
- Operators: ■ JNR (1963–1987); ■ JR East (1987–2011); ■ JR Central (1987–2007); ■ JR-West (1987 – present); ■ JR Shikoku (1999–2019)
- Depots: Kyōto; Miyahara; Fukuchiyama; Hiroshima; Takamatsu
- Line served: Various

Specifications
- Car body construction: Steel; Stainless steel (SaRo 124/SaRo 125)
- Car length: 20,000 mm (65 ft 7 in)
- Width: 2,900 mm (9 ft 6 in)
- Doors: 3 pairs per side
- Maximum speed: 110 km/h (68 mph)
- Traction system: Resistor control MT46 (111 series), MT54 (113 series)
- Deceleration: 3.0 km/(h⋅s) (1.9 mph/s)
- Electric system: 1,500 V DC
- Current collection: Overhead catenary
- Braking systems: Dynamic brake, electric brakes, air brakes
- Safety systems: ATS-SN, ATS-P
- Track gauge: 1,067 mm (3 ft 6 in)

The 113 series (113系, 113-kei) is a Japanese suburban electric multiple unit (EMU) train type introduced in 1963 by Japanese National Railways (JNR), currently operated by West Japan Railway Company (JR-West) and Shikoku Railway Company (JR Shikoku), and formerly also operated by East Japan Railway Company (JR East) and Central Japan Railway Company (JR Central).

The design was derived from the earlier 111 series, and used newer MT54 motors with an output of 120 kW (160 hp). They are used in the mild temperature areas of Japan, due to their brakes not being capable of handling cold weather. The 115 series were built to operate in colder areas.

== Variants ==
=== 111 series ===
111 series
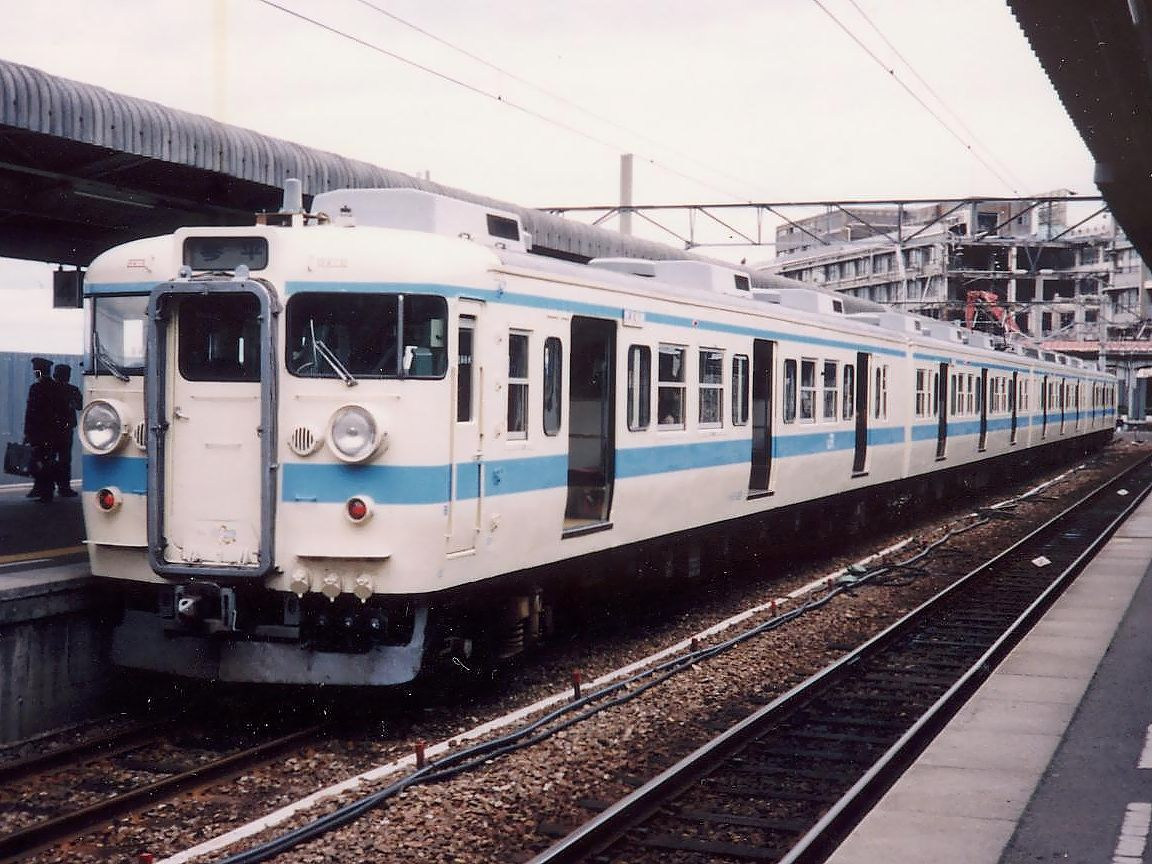
- JR Shikoku's 111 series EMU, April 1998
- In service: 1962–2001
- Manufacturers: JNR Niitsu Works, Hitachi, Kawasaki Heavy Industries, Kinki Sharyo, Kisha Seizo, Nippon Sharyo, Teikoku Sharyo, Tokyu Car Corporation
- Constructed: 1962–1963
- Entered service: 1962
- Refurbished: 1989 (Motor Generators Replaced with Static Inverters)
- Scrapped: 1987–2001
- Number built: 30 vehicles (initially 4 sets)
- Number in service: None
- Number preserved: 3 vehicles (2 Front Ends and 1 Whole End Car)
- Number scrapped: 26 vehicles
- Formation: 4/11 cars per trainset
- Fleet numbers: S37 – S38
- Operators: ■ JNR (1962–1987); ■ JR Shikoku (1987–2001)
- Line served: Various

Specifications
- Car body construction: Steel
- Car length: 20,000 mm (65 ft 7 in)
- Width: 2,956 mm (9 ft 8.4 in)
- Height: 4,077 mm (13 ft 4.5 in)
- Doors: 3 pairs per side
- Maximum speed: 110 km/h (70 mph)
- Traction system: Resistor control + Hollow shaft parallel cardan driveshaft
- Traction motors: MT46A (4x)
- Power output: 100kW Per Motor
- Transmission: Gear ratio: 17:82
- Deceleration: 3.0 km/(h⋅s) (1.9 mph/s)
- Electric system: 1,500 V DC
- Current collection: Overhead catenary
- Braking systems: Dynamic brake, electric brakes, air brakes
- Safety systems: ATS-SN, ATS-P
- Coupling system: Shibata-Type
- Track gauge: 1,067 mm (3 ft 6 in)

The 111 series was a Japanese suburban electric multiple unit. Built in 1962 and 1963 for JNR, the 111 series served as a prototype of sorts for the 113 series sets that were to soon follow.

Based on the earlier 421 series, the 111 series was built as an attempt to combat the overcrowding of platforms through the use of three-door cars as opposed to two-door cars. Production of the 111 series was stopped in 1963 once production was shifted to the 113 series cars; only thirty 111 series cars were produced.

After the privatization of the JNR, the sets' ownership was taken over by JR Shikoku, which used the sets until March 2001, after which they were retired. Four cars are currently preserved; KuHa 111–1 at the SCMaglev and Railway Park in Nagoya, Japan, KuHa 111-3002 stored in JR Shikoku's Tadotsu Works and MoHa 110-1 and MoHa 111-1 stored at JR Central's Hamamatsu Works. The sectioned front ends of KuHa 111-1072 and KuHa 111-2152 are also preserved at the Poppo-no-oka farm shop in Isumi, Chiba.

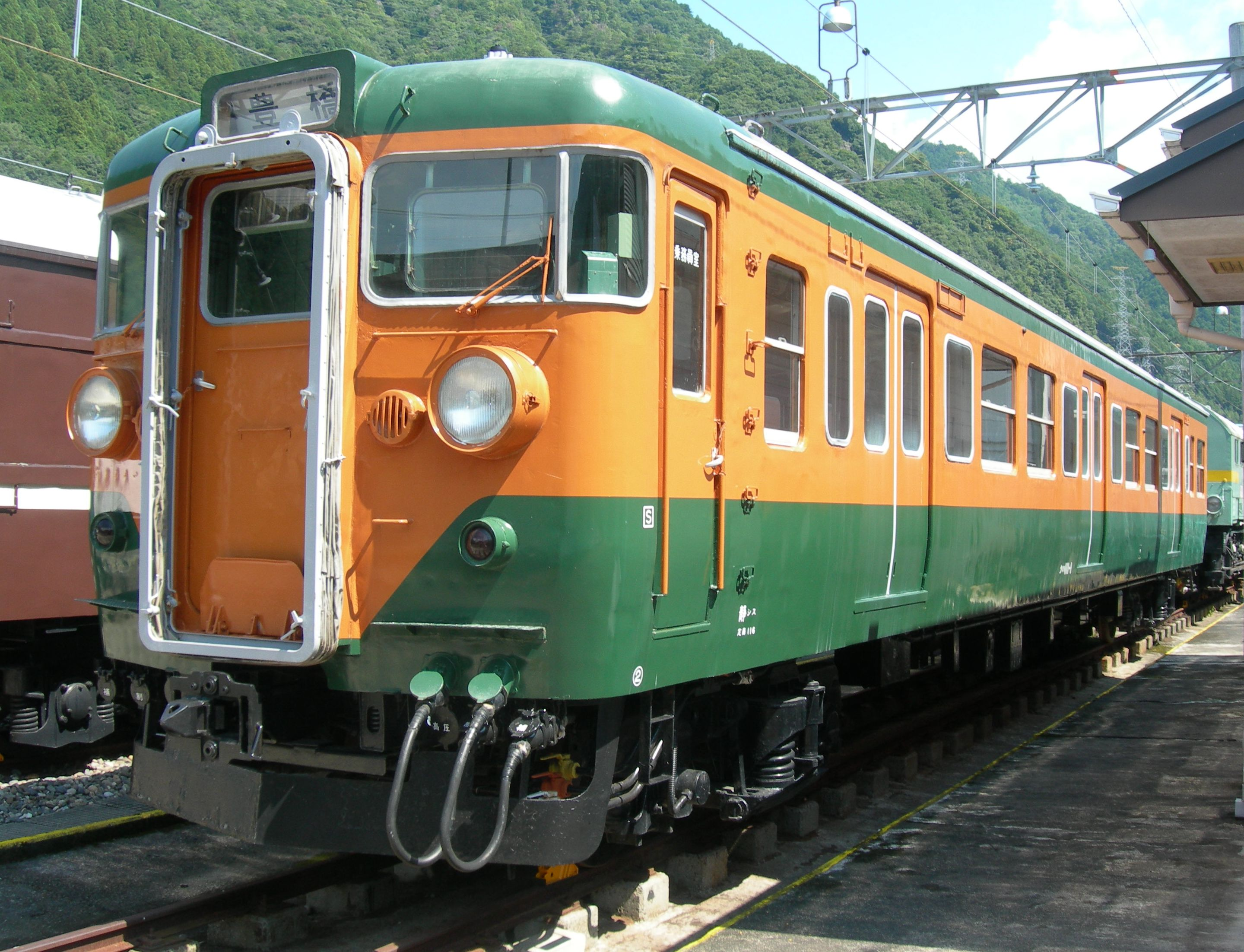
KuHa 111-1 preserved at the SCMaglev and Railway Park Museum in Nagoya, Japan, 2008

=== 113-0 series ===
These sets were the first of the 113 series, and were put to use on the Sobu and Yokosuka Lines. They had the same body structure as the 111 series, with only the driver's cab being extended. In 1970, AU73X, AU74X, AU75X type air conditioning was fitted experimentally to sets operated in the Kansai area. The test was successful, and hence was fitted into the majority of the cars. Production of the -0 series ceased in 1973, and most sets have now been withdrawn.

=== 113-0 series (JR Shikoku) ===
Three 113-0 sets were transferred to JR Shikoku from JR East for refurbishment. Following refurbishment, they differed externally from most 113 series train sets because they had lower front destination signs and rectangular headlights. Each set also came in a different colour scheme; set 1 in a coat of lime green surrounding the windows with light blue; set 2 in red and pink; and set 3 in orange and yellow. All had a ribbon of silver on the top and bottom, and the colours were arranged in the same pattern. The last of these sets was withdrawn in 2019.

| Former numbering | Set 1 | Set 2 | Set 3 | Current | Set 1 | Set 2 | Set 3 |
|---|---|---|---|---|---|---|---|
| Car 1 | KuHa 111-223 | KuHa 111-198 | KuHa 111-222 | → | KuHa 113-1 | KuHa 113-2 | KuHa 113-3 |
| Car 2 | MoHa 113-257 | MoHa 113-270 | MoHa 113-272 | → | MoHa 113-1 | MoHa 113-2 | MoHa 113-3 |
| Car 3 | MoHa 112-257 | MoHa 112-270 | MoHa 112-272 | → | MoHa 112-1 | MoHa 112-2 | MoHa 112-3 |
| Car 4 | KuHa 111-532 | KuHa 111-529 | KuHa 111-528 | → | KuHa 112-1 | KuHa 112-2 | KuHa 112-3 |

=== 113-700 series ===
These sets were built for use on the Kosei Line, due to the heavy amounts of snowfall in the region. They feature semi automatic doors, snowploughs and improved brakes. Some trains were also transferred to the Sagano Line.

=== 113-1000 series ===
These sets were introduced from 1972, and were an improved version of the 113–0 series, for use on the Sobu and Yokosuka Lines. They incorporated fire resistant materials, sealed beam headlights and air conditioning. These trains were used around the Boso area, on the Narita Line, Kashima Line, Sotobo Line, and Uchibo Line.

However, due to minor modifications of the ATC and air conditioning in some trains in April 1972, some of the trains from the Boso area were transferred for use on the Tokaido Line.

=== 113-1500 series ===
These sets were an improvement on the 113–1000 series and these sets were all located at Ofuna. They ran on the Sobu and Yokosuka Lines and on the Tokaido Line. All 113–1500 series trains were fitted with ATC-5 and ATS-P/SN.

=== 113-2000 series ===
These sets are an improvement on the 113–0 series. The seat pitch was extended to 1,490 millimetres (58.7 in), which was a 70-millimetre (2.8 in) increase compared to its predecessor. Also, the width of the seat was widened from 880 millimetres (34.6 in) to 965 millimetres (38.0 in). Some of these sets remain in service at Kosei Line and Kusatsu Line.

=== 113-3800 series ===
These are JR-West 2-car sets which were converted in 2001 by building new cabs at one end of former MoHa (non-driving motor) cars.

== Livery variations ==
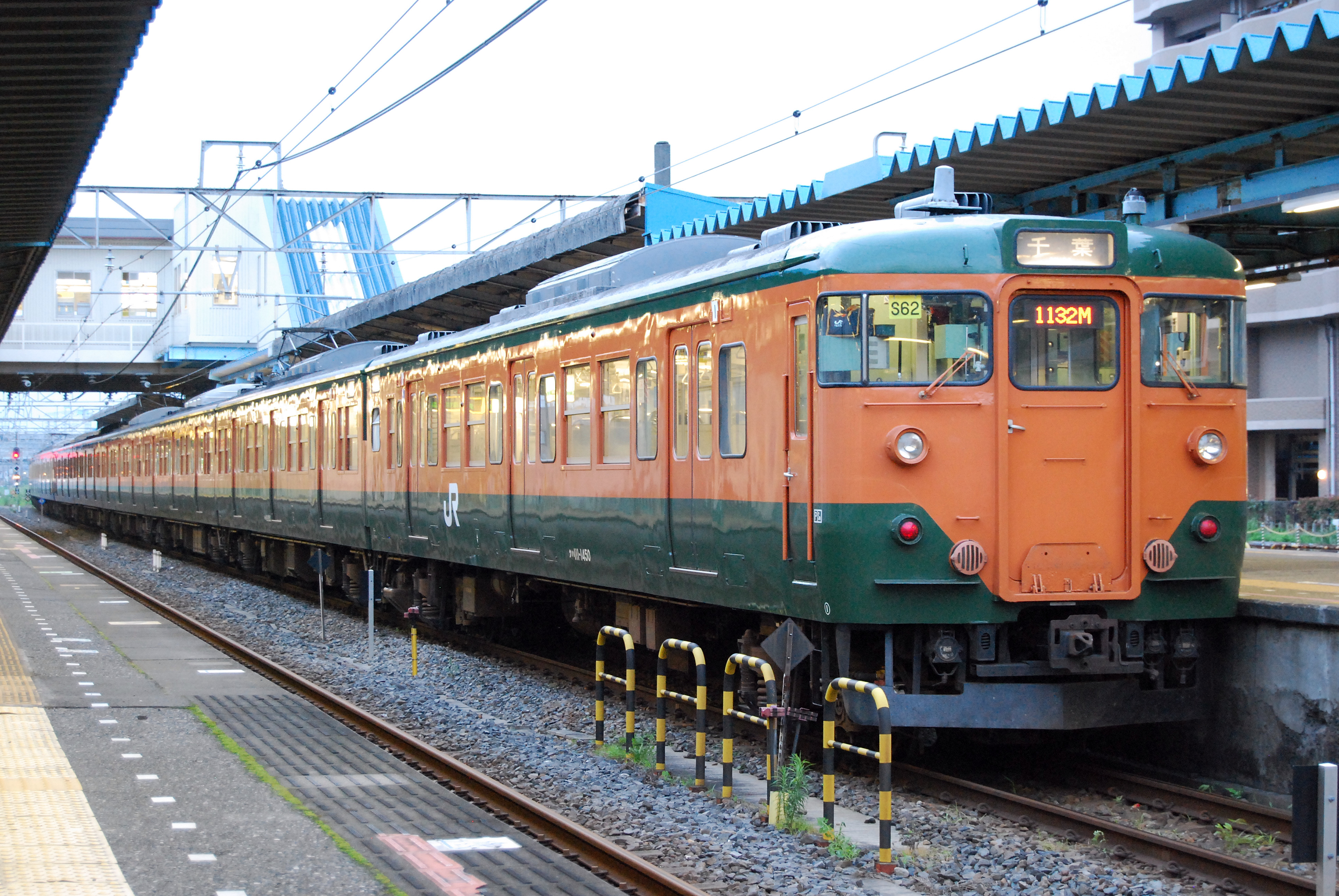
"Shonan" livery

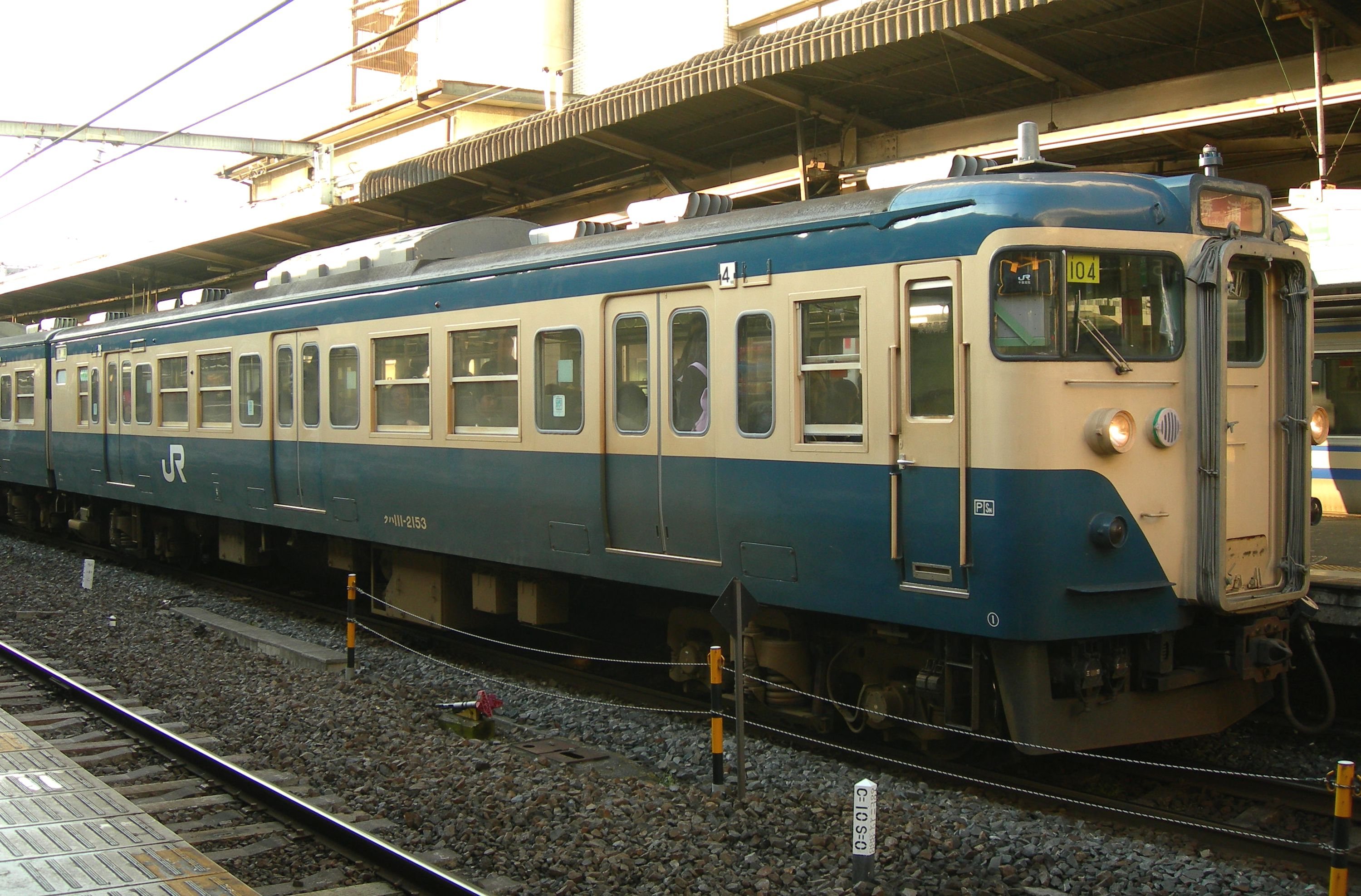
"Suka" livery

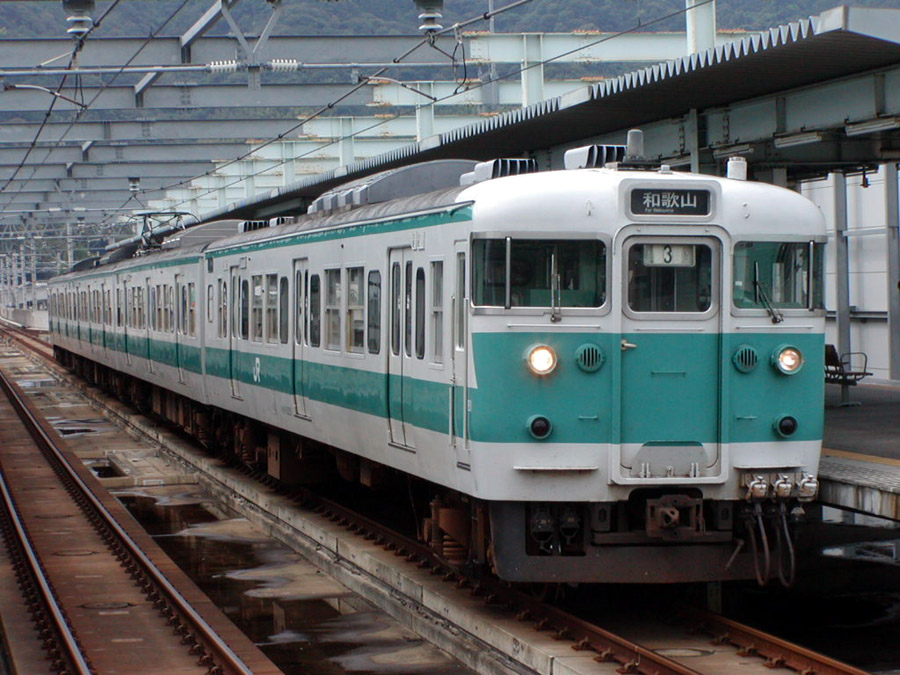
Hanwa "Blue Liner" livery

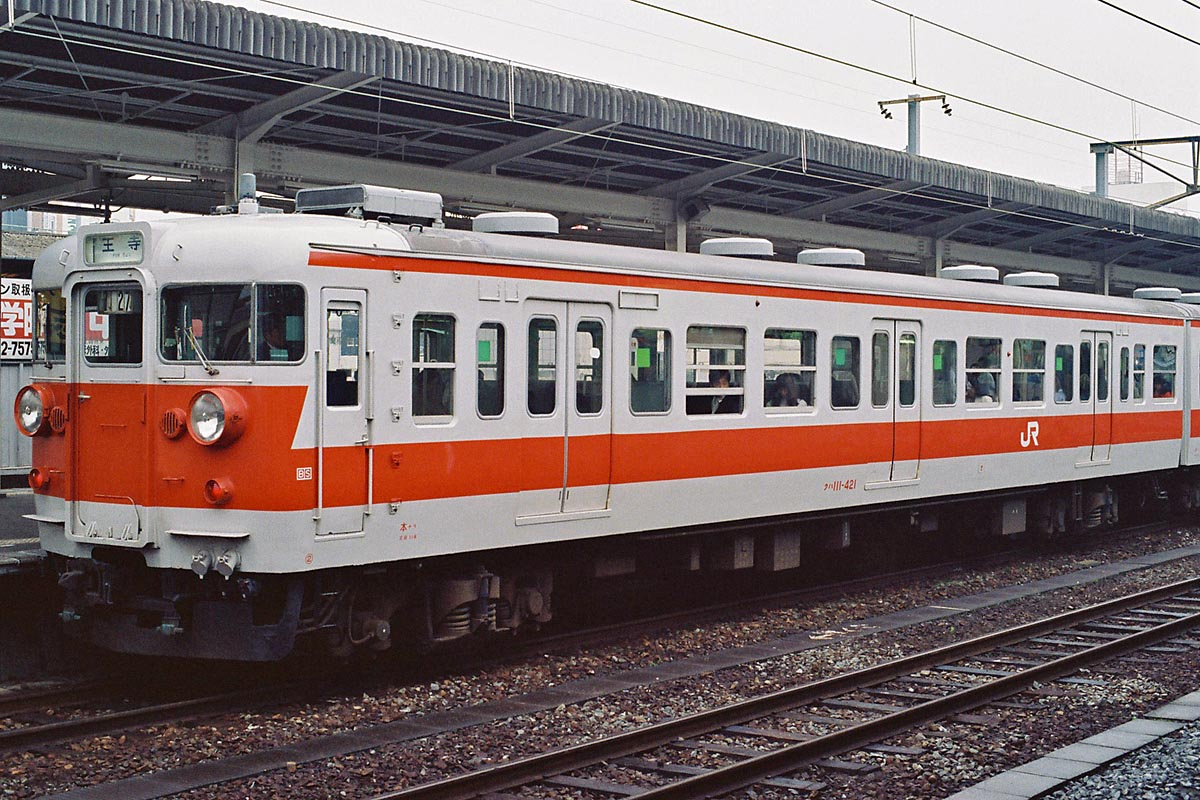
Kasuga livery

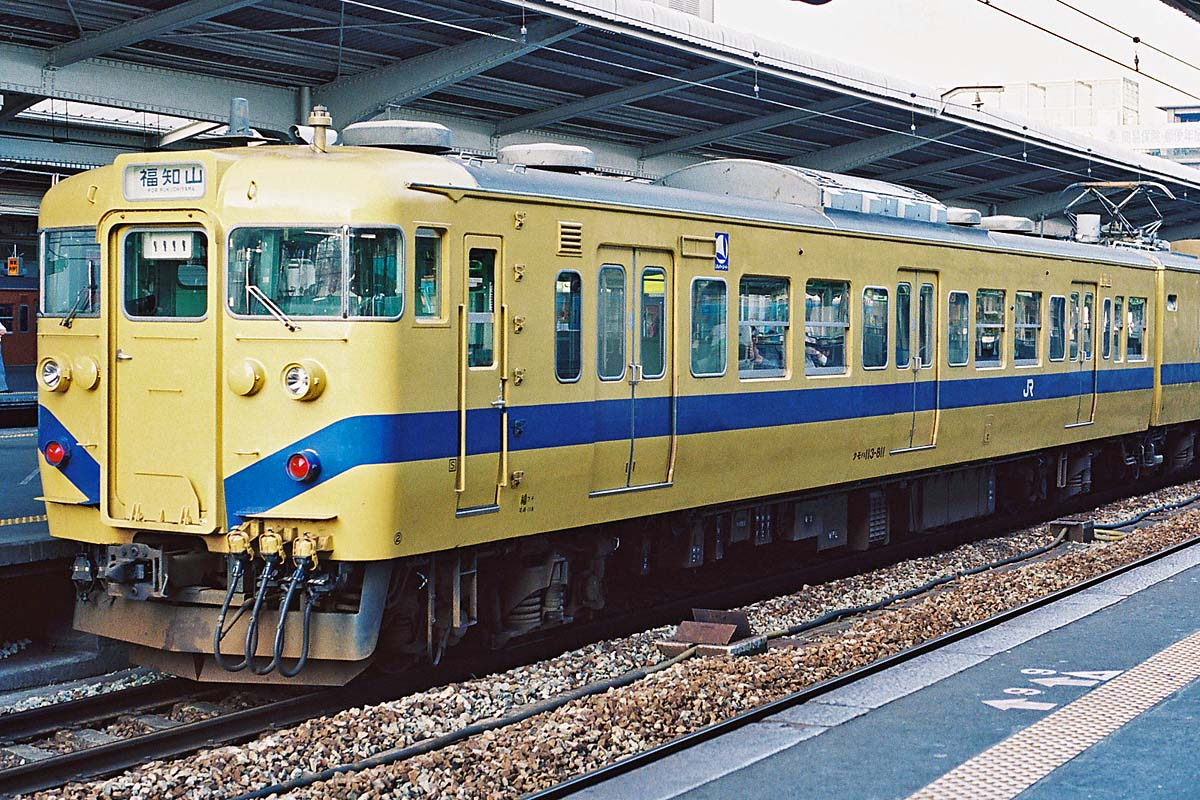
(Old) Fukuchiyama Line livery (113-800 series)

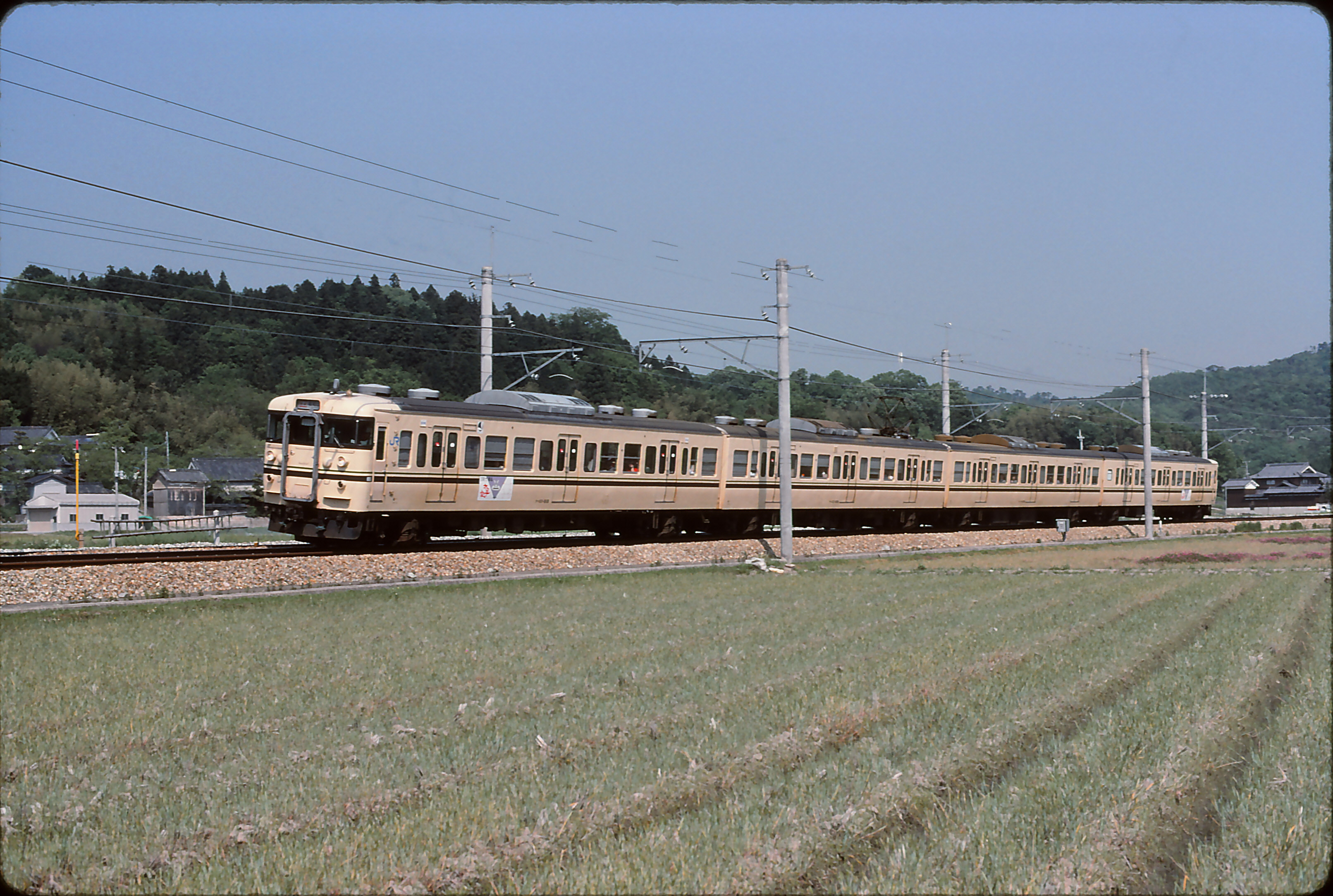
New Fukuchiyama Line livery (113-800 series)

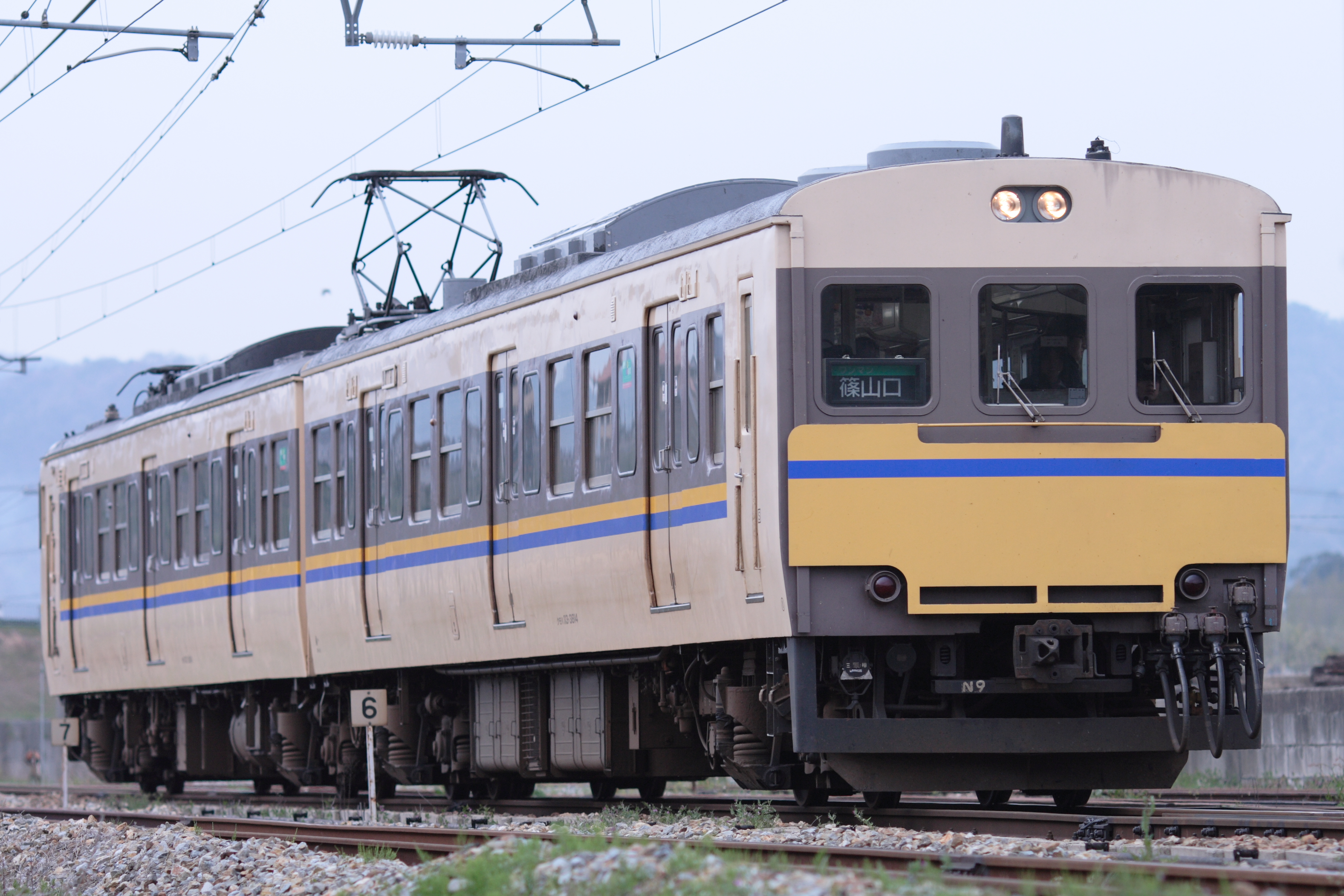
Fukuchiyama "wanman" livery (113-3800 series)

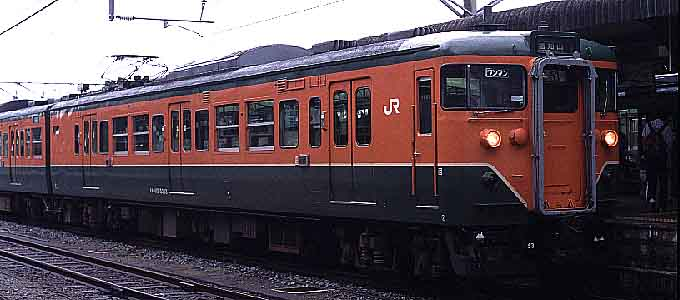
Sagano "wanman" livery (113-5300 series)

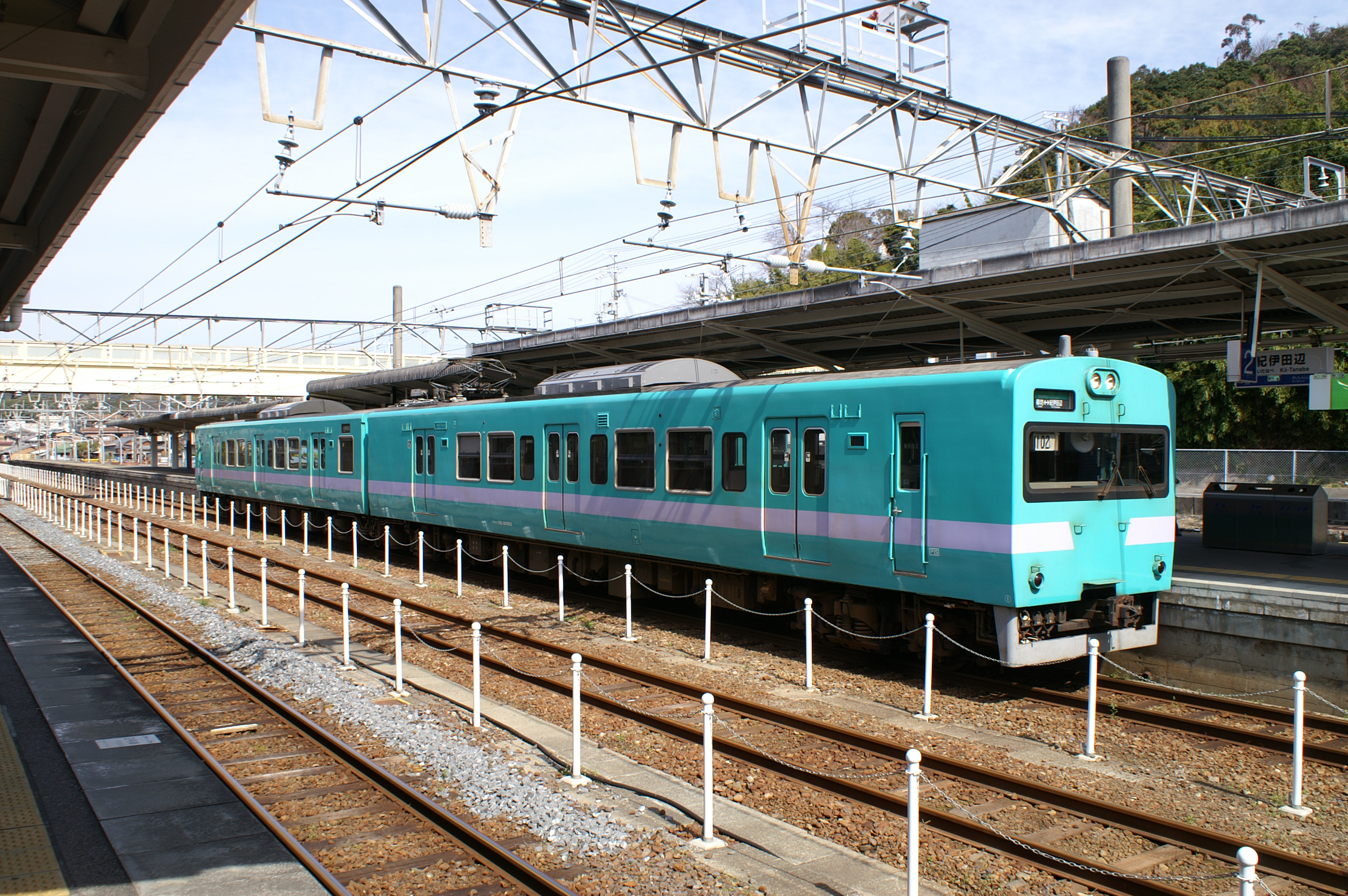
(Old) Wakayama livery (113-2000 series)

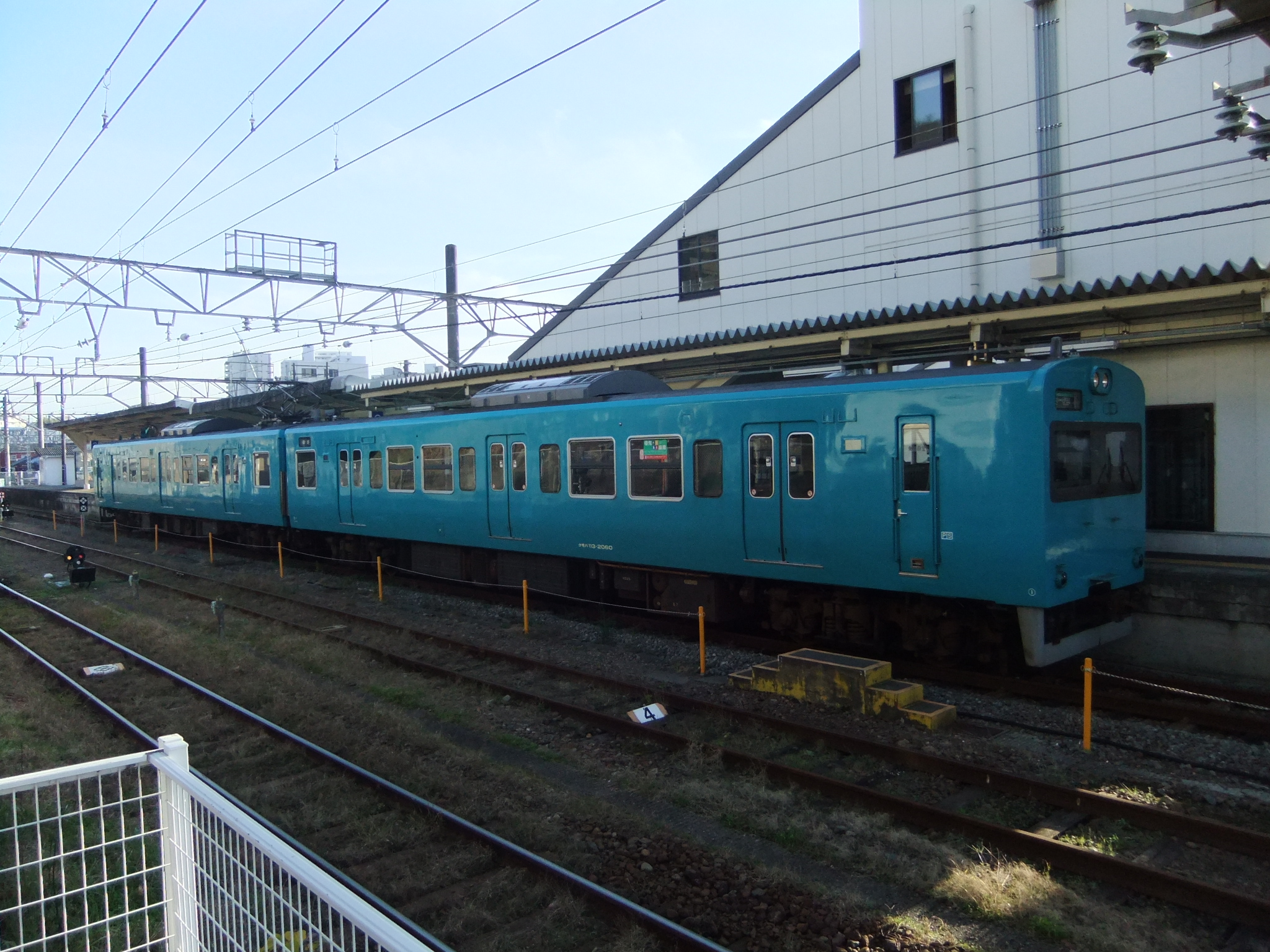
New Wakayama livery (113-2000 series)

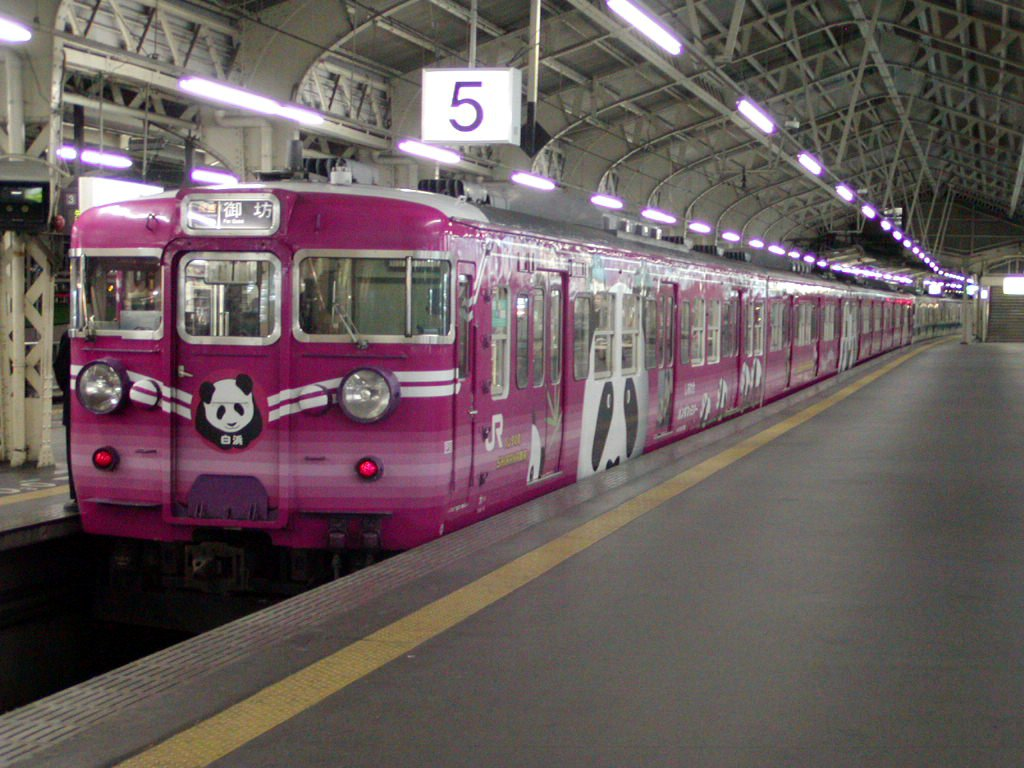
Shirahama Panda livery

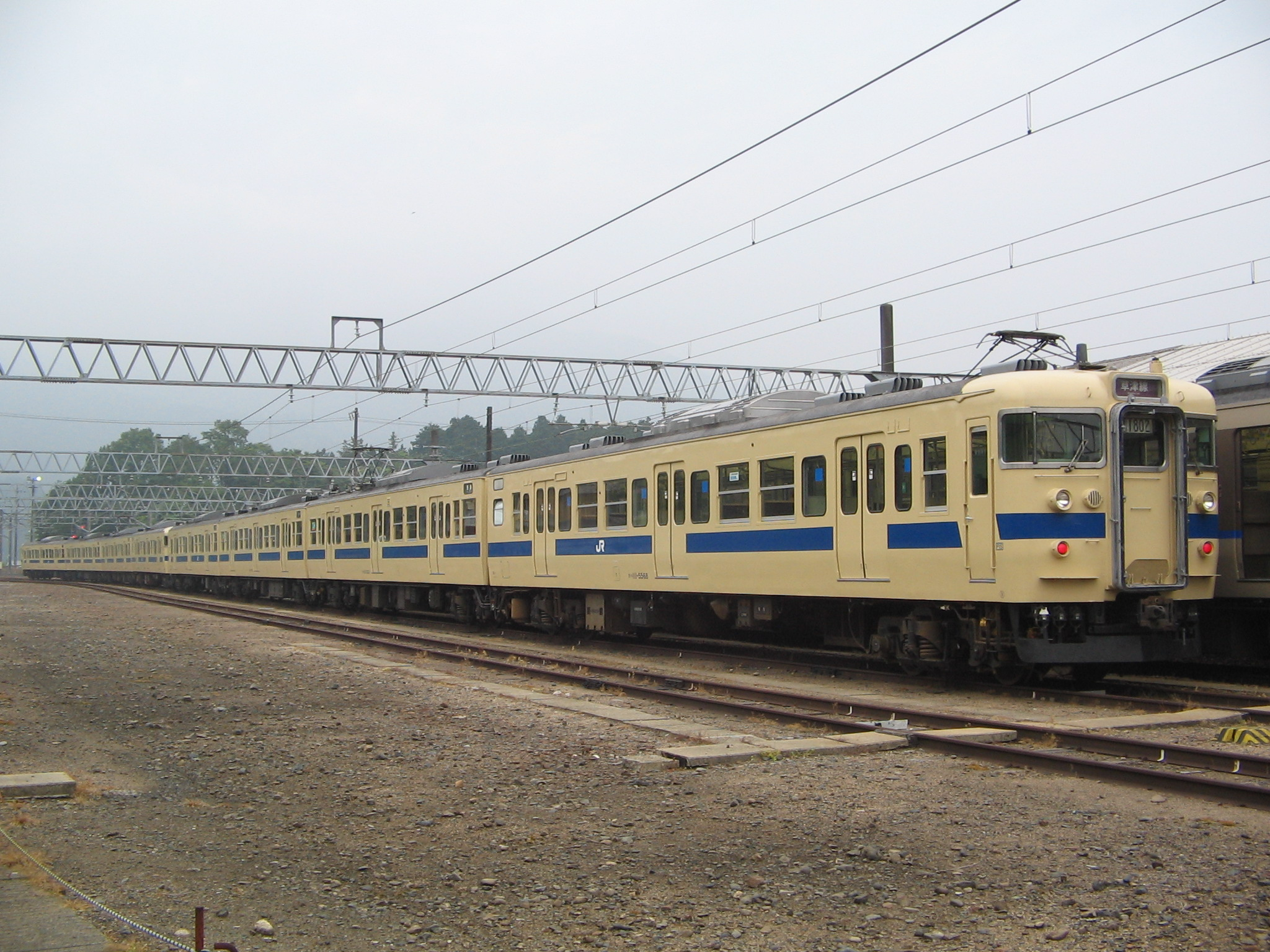
Setouchi livery

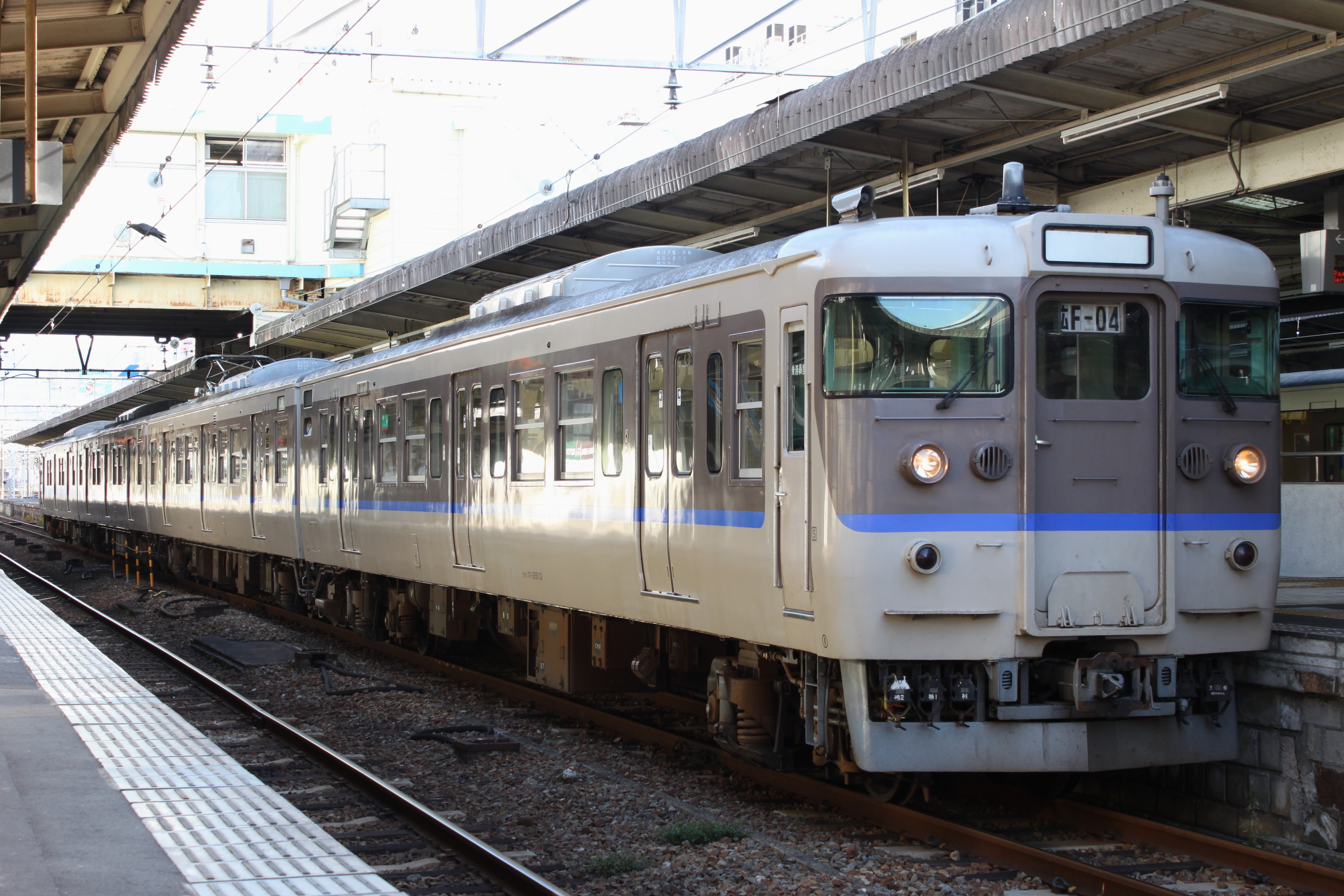
Kansai refurbished livery

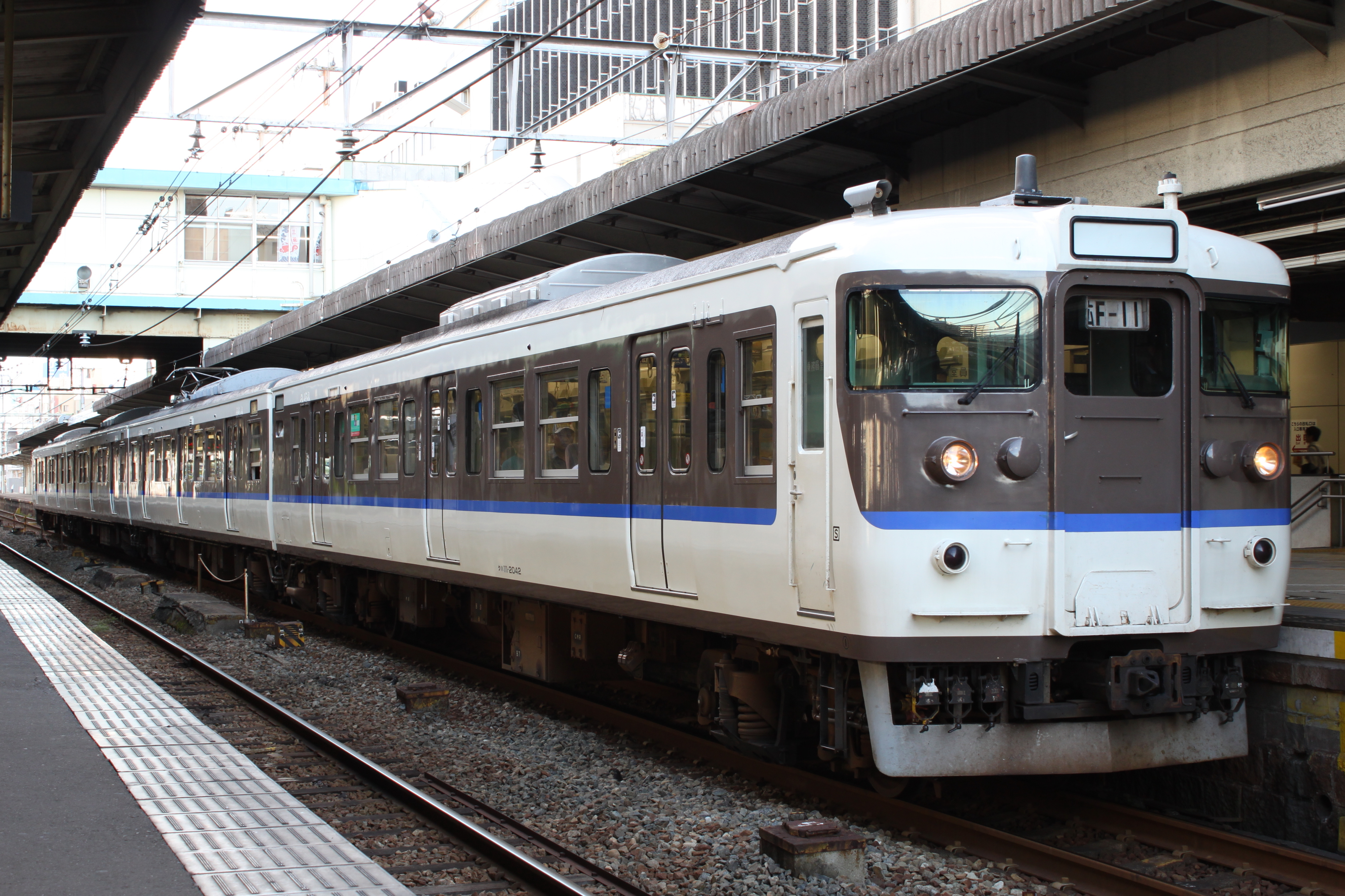
Hiroshima refurbished livery

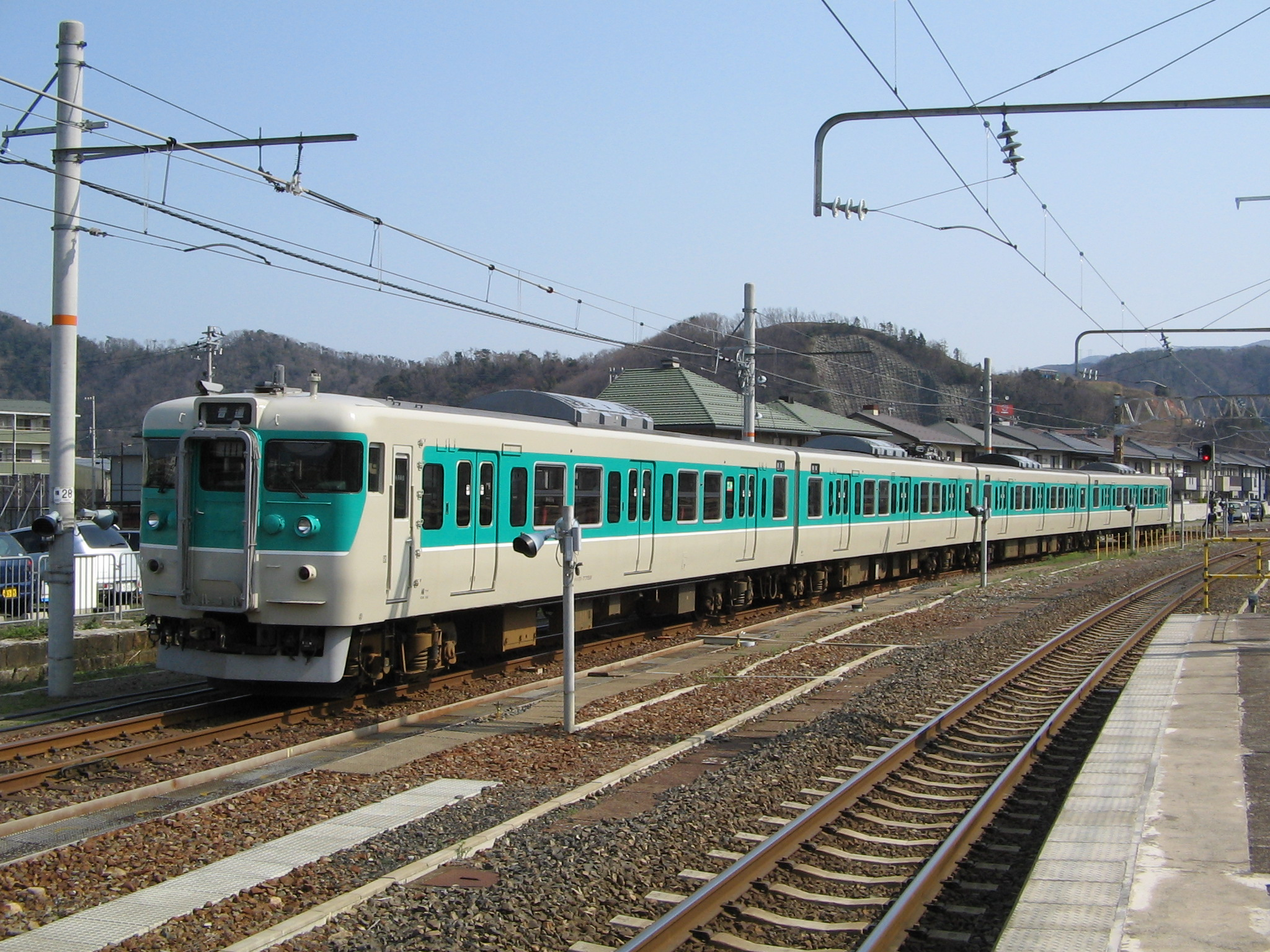
Obama Line livery

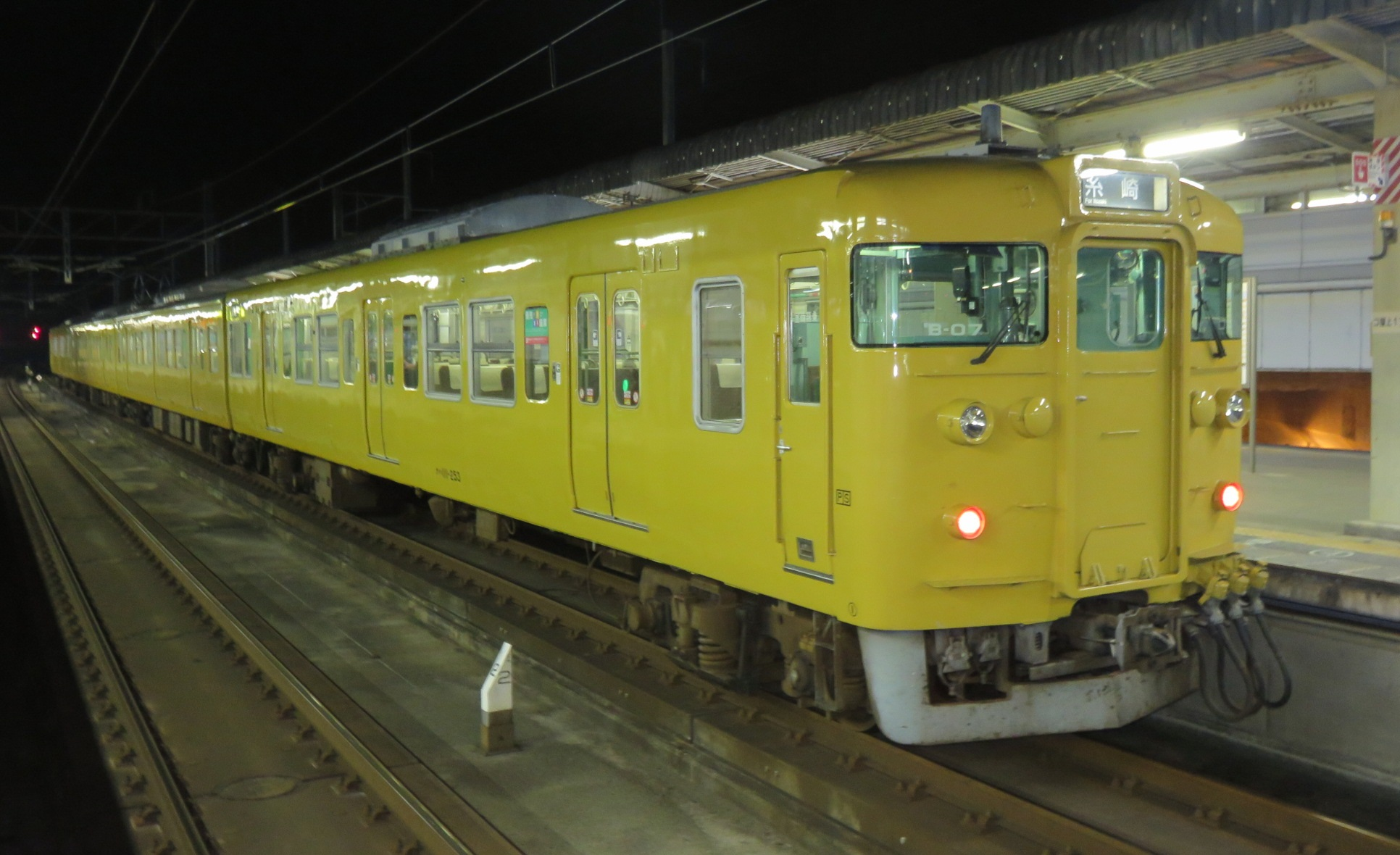
Setouchi area livery

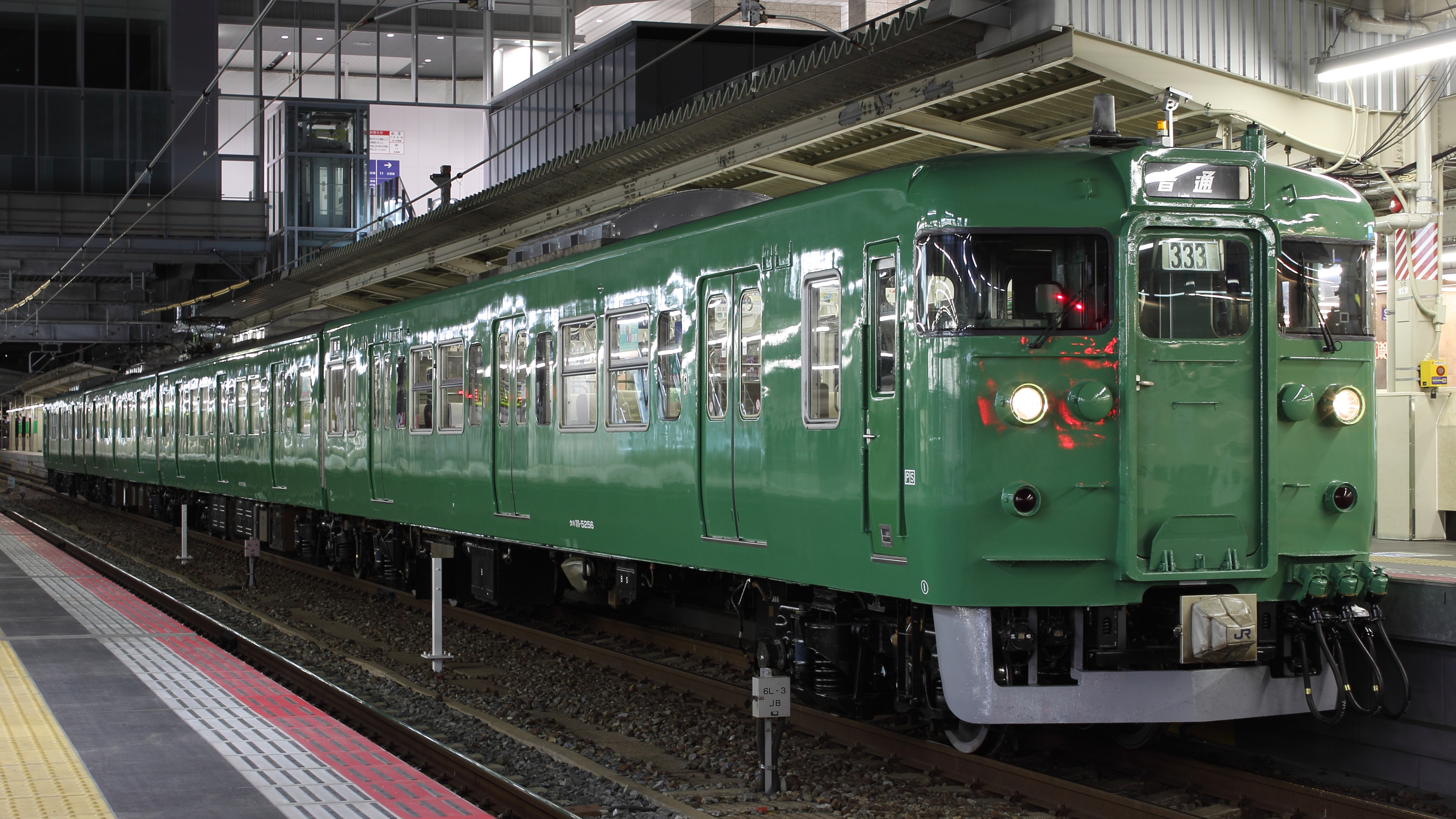
Kyoto and Kitakinki area livery

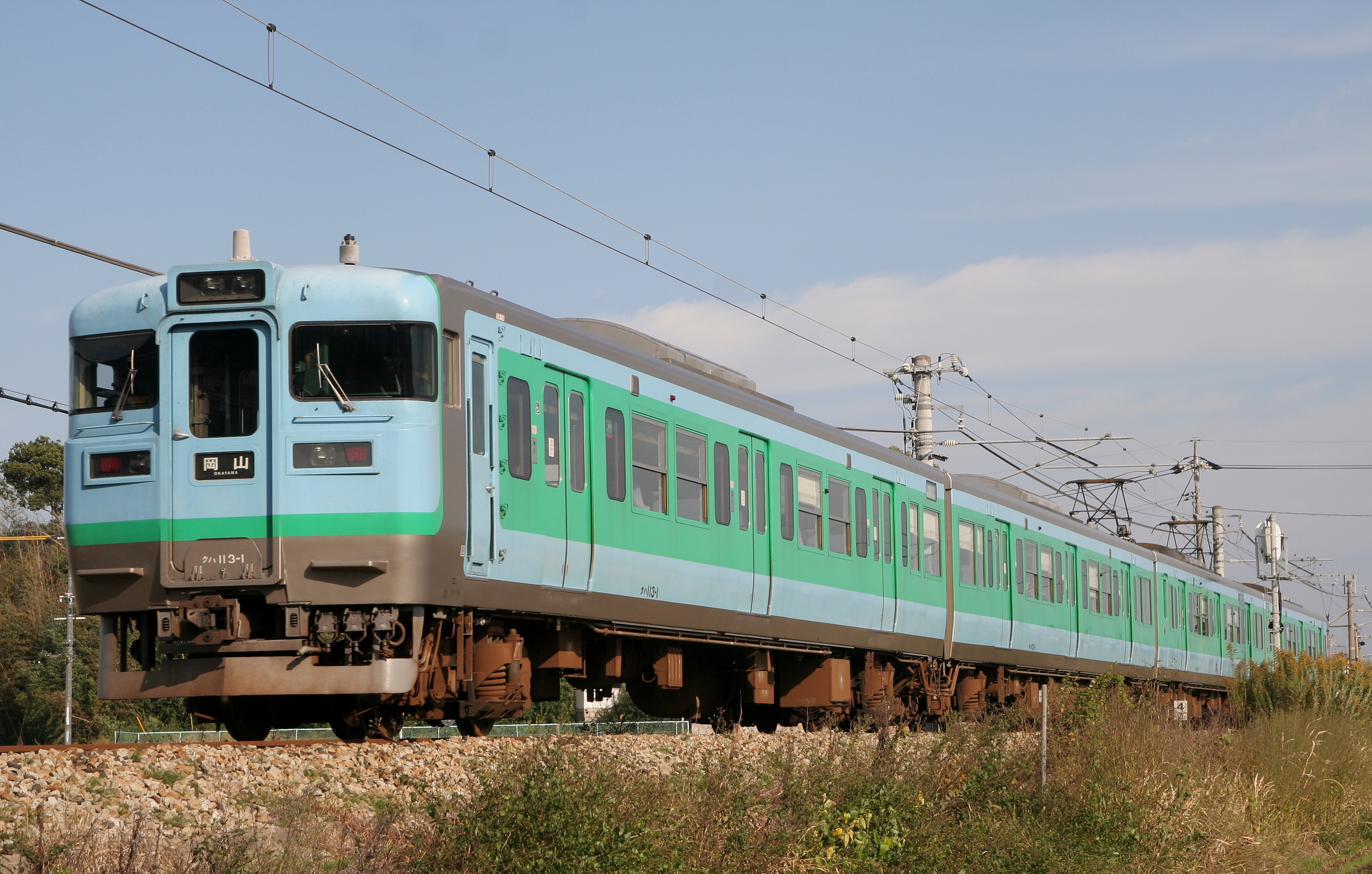
Shikoku livery trainset 1

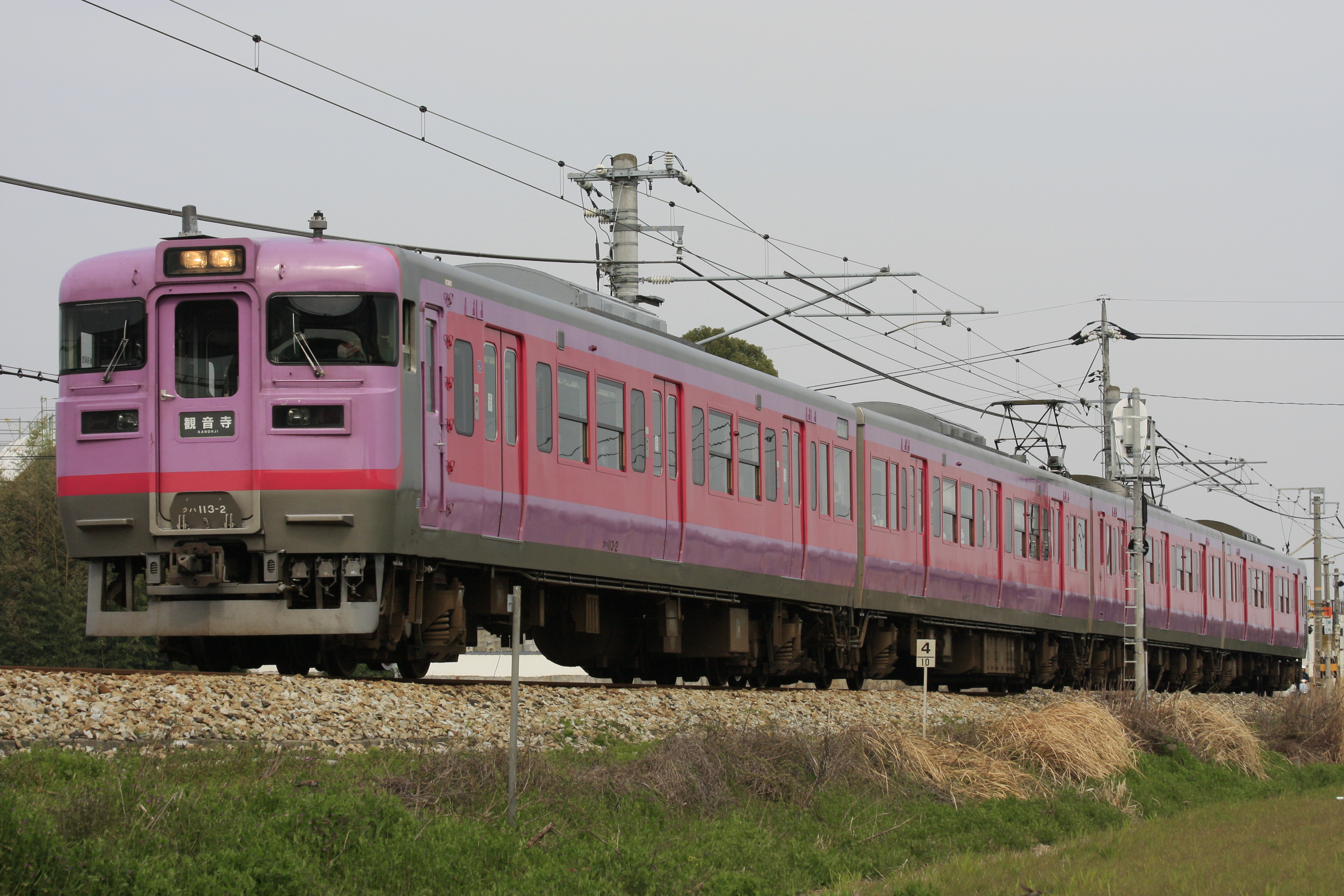
Shikoku livery trainset 2

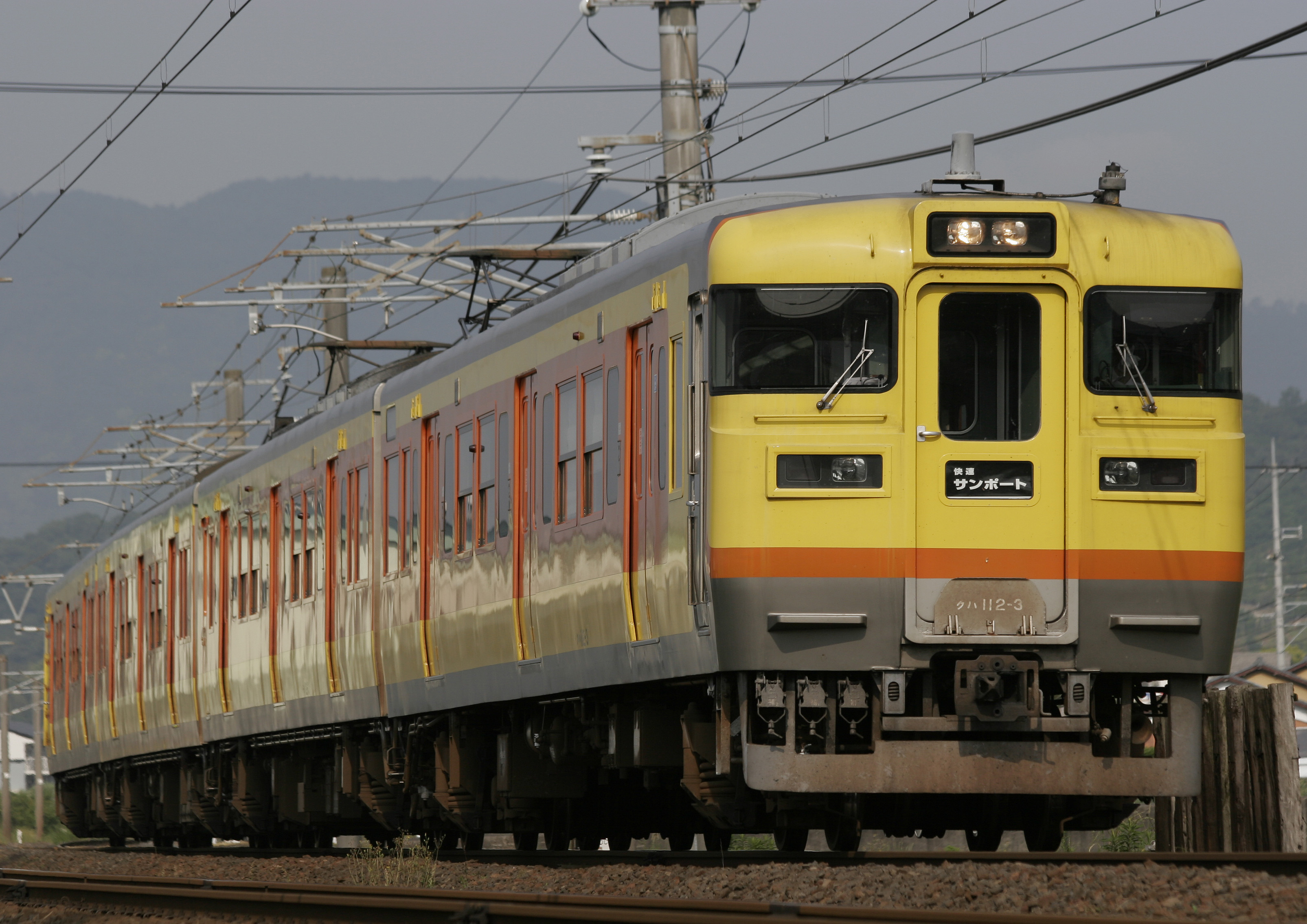
Shikoku livery trainset 3

== Preserved examples ==
- KuHa 111-1 (preserved at SCMaglev and Railway Park in Nagoya, Aichi since 2011, previously preserved at Sakuma Rail Park, Hamamatsu, Shizuoka)
- KuHa 111-3002 (preserved at JR Shikoku's Tadotsu Works) - Scrapped in December 2011
- MoHa 110-1 & MoHa 111-1 (preserved at JR Central's Hamamatsu works) - Scrapped in December 2010
- KuHa 111-1072 (front end only, preserved at Isumi, Chiba)
- KuHa 111-2152 (front end only, preserved at Isumi, Chiba)
