= 115 series =

Japanese electric multiple unit train type

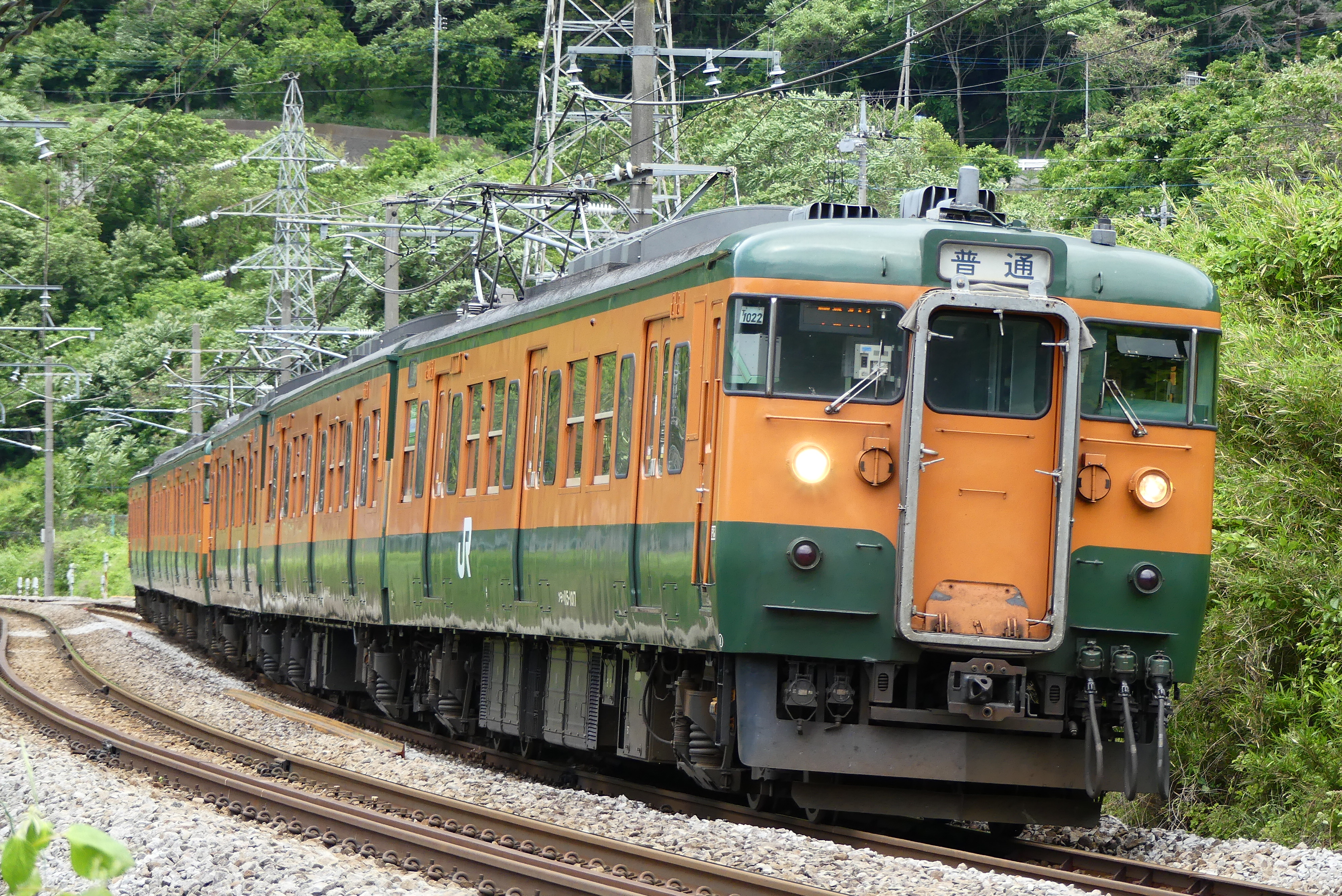
- A 6-car 115 series formation in Shonan livery on the Jōetsu Line in June 2017
- In service: 1963–present
- Replaced: 80 series
- Constructed: 1963–1983
- Entered service: March 1963
- Refurbished: 1998– (for selected 115 series trains)
- Scrapped: 1987–
- Number built: 1,921 vehicles
- Number in service: 205 vehicles (as of April 2025)
- Number preserved: 2 vehicles
- Successor: E129 series, 211 series, 223 series, 227 series, E231-1000 series, 311 series, 313 series
- Fleet numbers: A01 – A17, C13, C21, D01 – D31, G01 – G08, L01 – L22, L99, N01 – N21, O03 – O04, R01 – R05, T11 – T14, T1020, T1022, T1032, T1036 – T1041, T1043 – T1044, T1046, T1090 – T1091, T1133, T1142 – T1145, T1147, T1159
- Operators: ■ JNR (1963–1987); ■ JR East (1987–2022); ■ JR Central (1987–2007); ■ JR West (1987 – present); ■ Shinano Railway (1997 – present); Izukyu Railway (2002–2009)
- Depots: Toyoda; Nagano; Niigata; Fukuchiyama; Okayama; Hiroshima; Shimonoseki; Togura

Specifications
- Car body construction: Steel
- Doors: 3 pairs per side 2 pairs per side (115-3000 series)
- Maximum speed: 110 km/h (68 mph)
- Traction system: Resistor control
- Electric system: 1,500 V DC overhead lines
- Current collection: Pantograph
- Braking system: Dynamic braking for retarder
- Safety systems: ATS-S, ATS-P
- Coupling system: Shibata
- Track gauge: 1,067 mm (3 ft 6 in)

The 115 series (115系, 115-kei) is a DC electric multiple unit (EMU) train type developed by Japanese National Railways (JNR) and now operated by West Japan Railway Company (JR-West), and the Shinano Railway.

== Operations ==
=== JR East ===
JR East operated their last 115 series train on 11 March 2022. 115 series trains were previously used on the Shōnan-Shinjuku Line, Takasaki Line, Utsunomiya Line, Chuo Main Line (East Line), Shinonoi Line, Oito Line, Agatsuma Line, Ryomo Line, Joetsu Line, Shinetsu Main Line, Yahiko Line, and the Echigo Line.

=== JR-West ===
Currently used on the Hakubi Line, Maizuru Line, Sagano Line, Sanin Main Line and the Sanyō Main Line

=== JR Central ===
Formerly used on the Minobu Line, Gotemba Line and the Tōkaidō Main Line. Sets owned by JR East currently operate on the JR Central Iida Line and Chūō Main Line (West Line).

=== Shinano Railway ===
Currently used on the Shinano Railway Line. Start of retirement in July 2020 with the debut of the new SR1 series on 4 July 2020.

== Variants ==
=== 115-0 series ===
This is a cold-weather and mountainous line version of the earlier 113 series. The first examples were introduced from 1963 on the Takasaki Line out of Ueno.

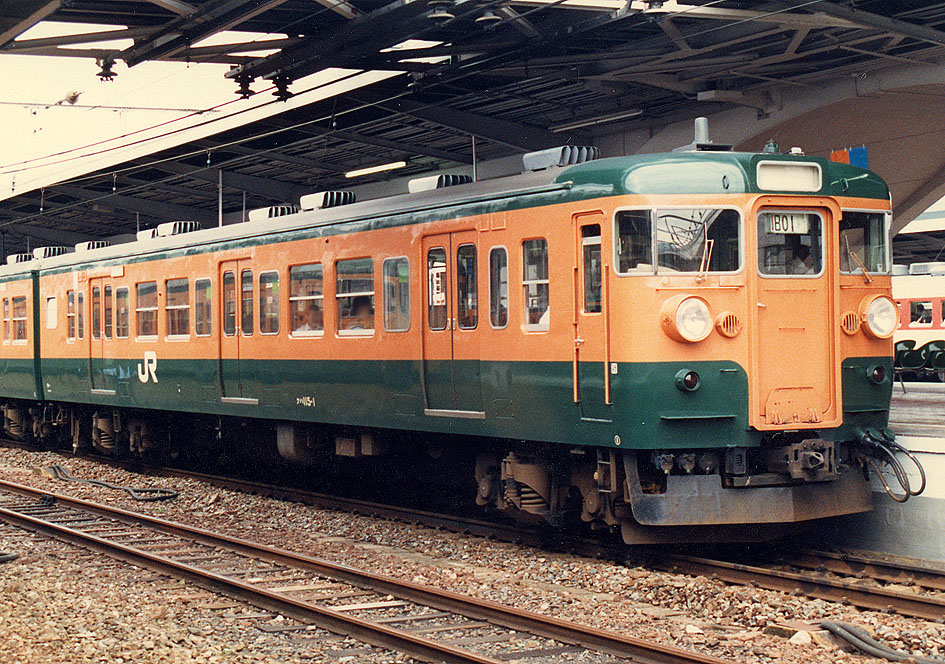
115-0 series in 1989

=== 115-300 series ===
Air-conditioned version introduced from 1973.

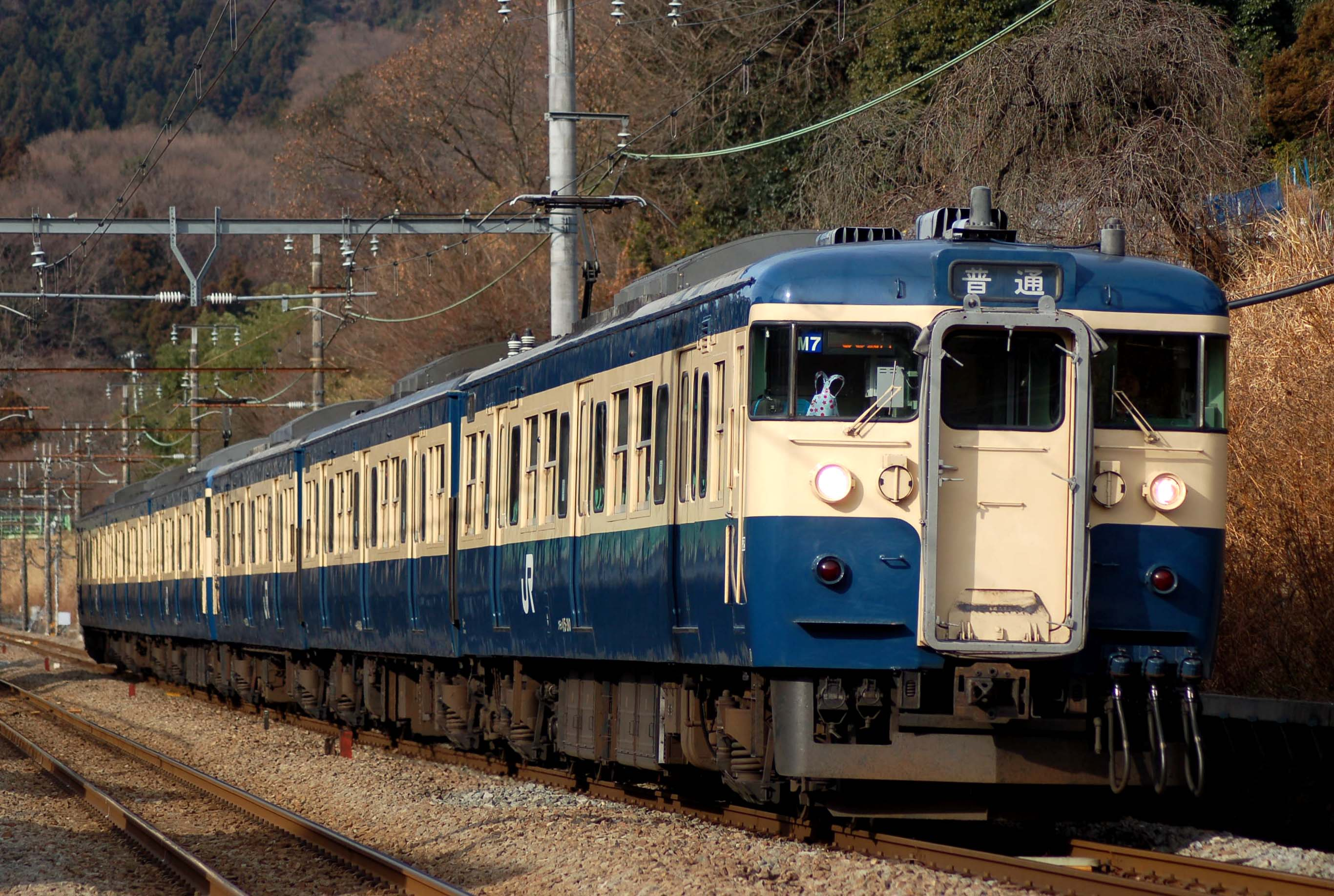
115-300 series in 2008 January

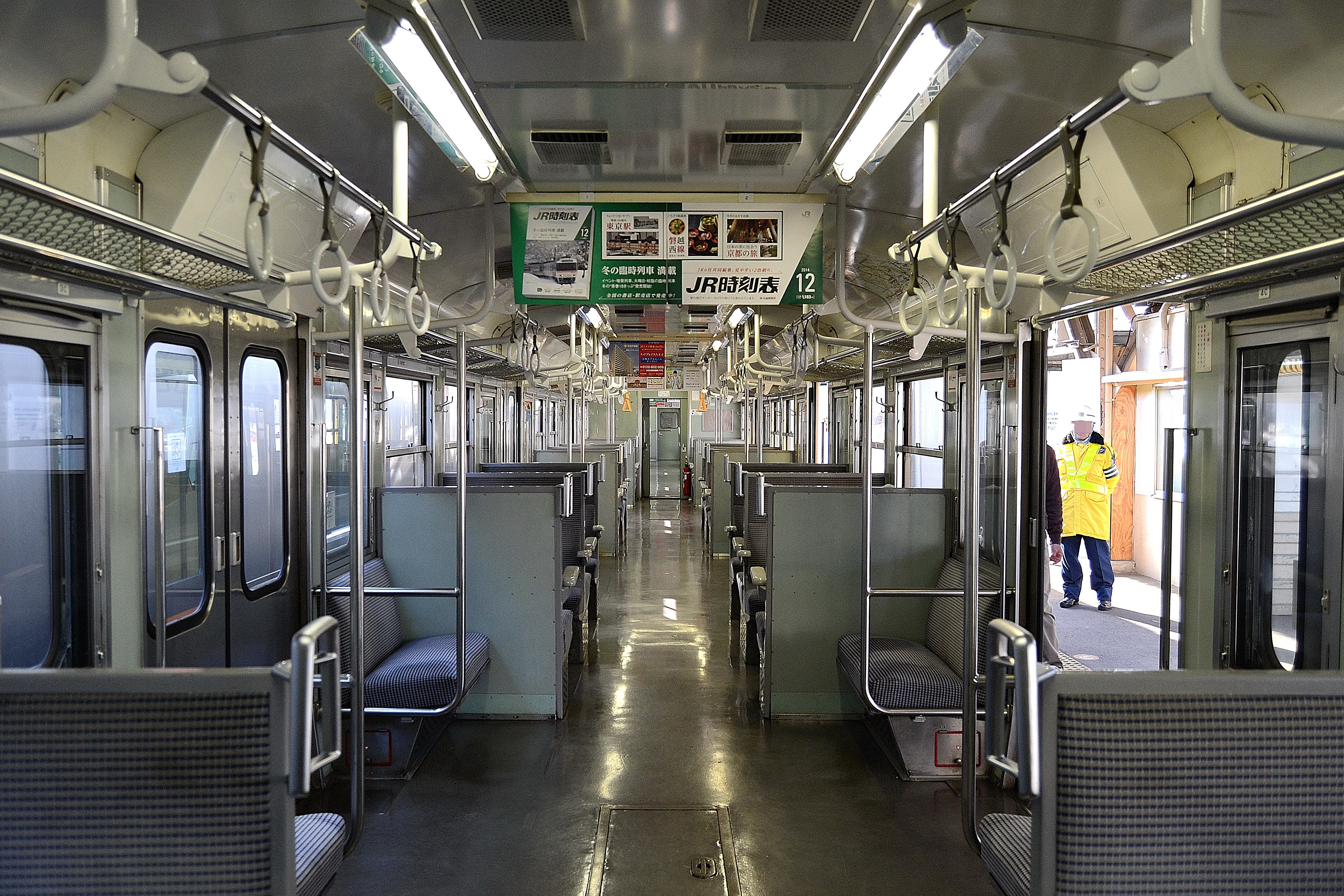
Interior view in November 2014

=== 115-1000 series ===
Introduced from 1978 with increased seat pitch and improved cold-weather performance.

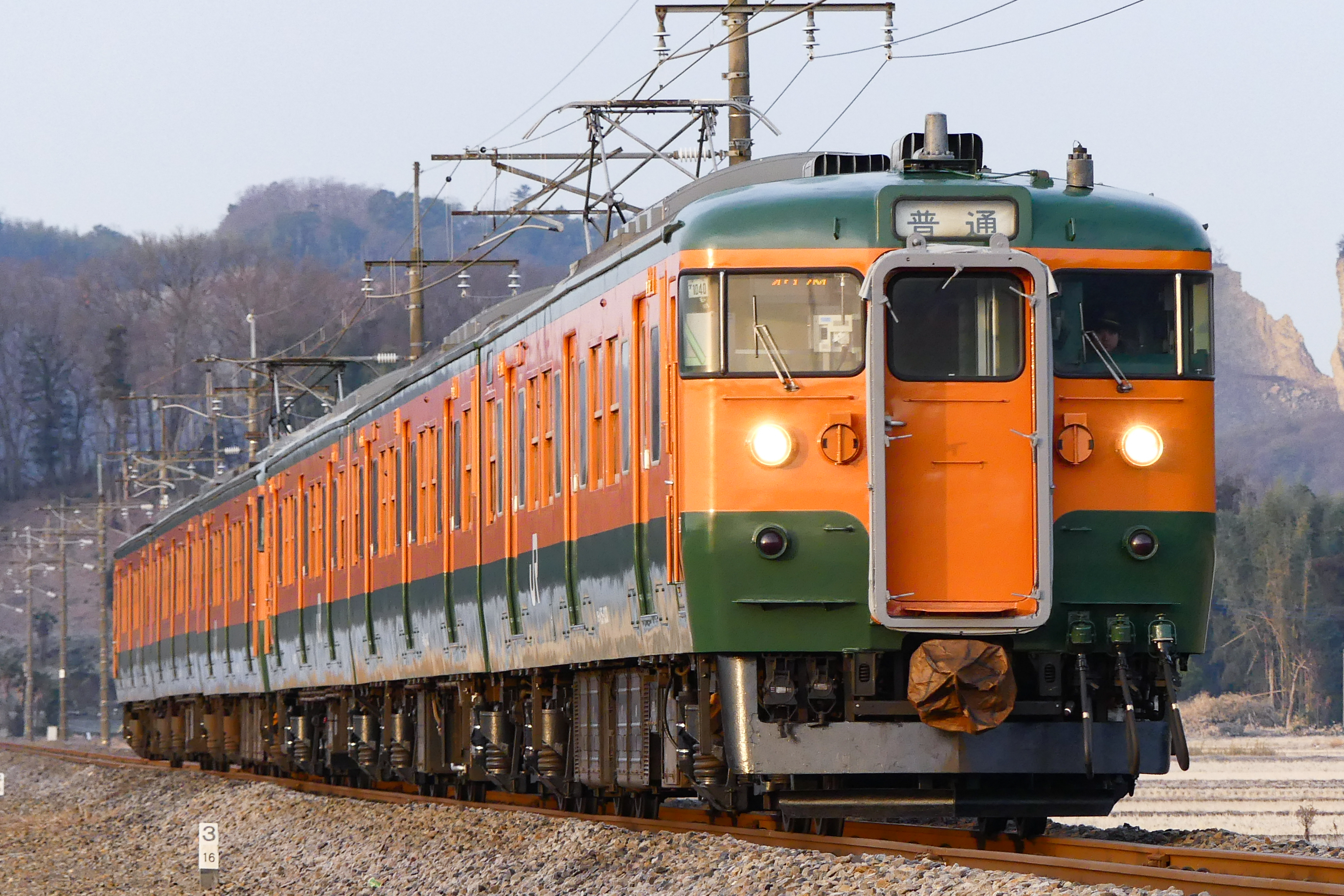
115-1000 series in January 2017

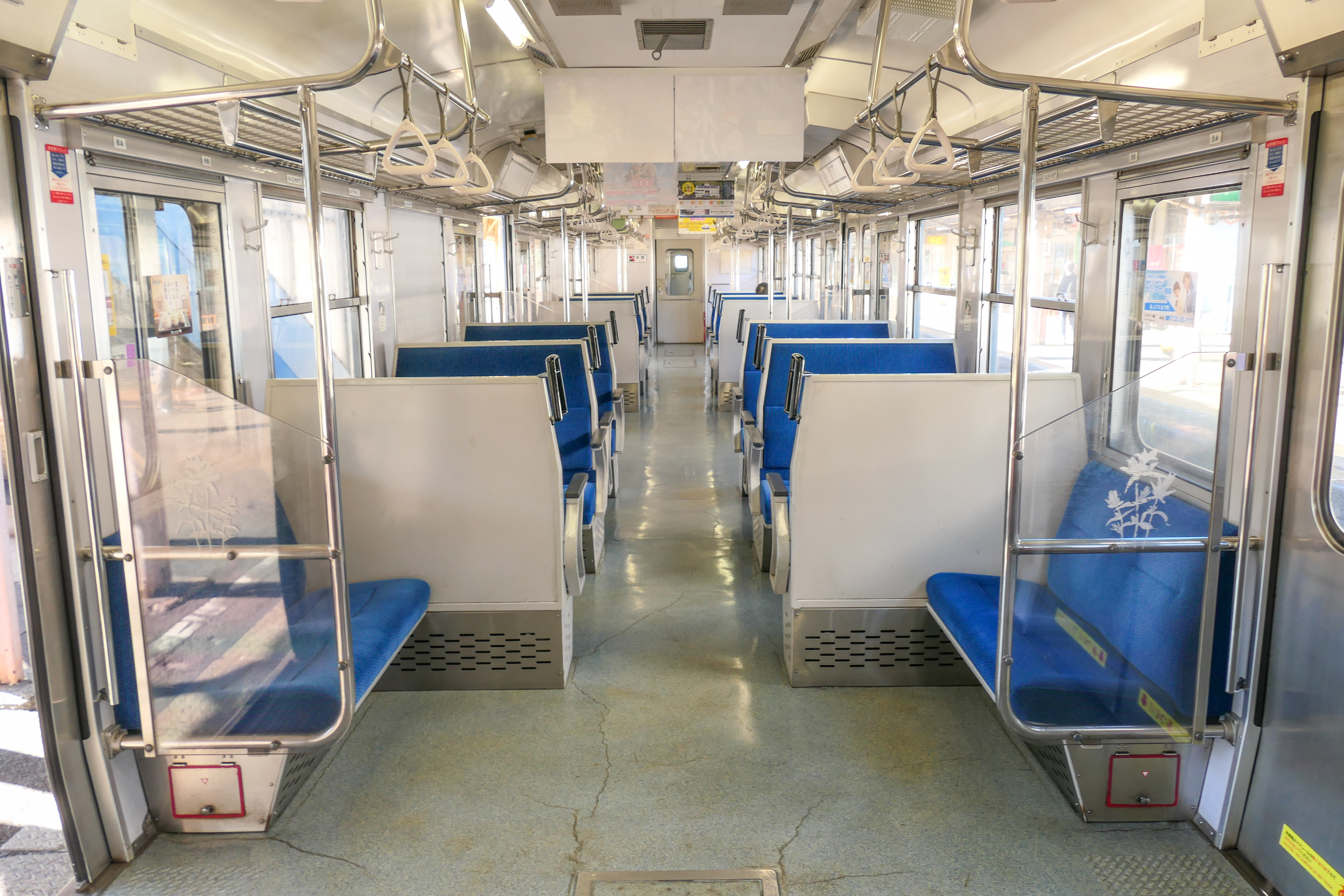
Interior view in October 2021

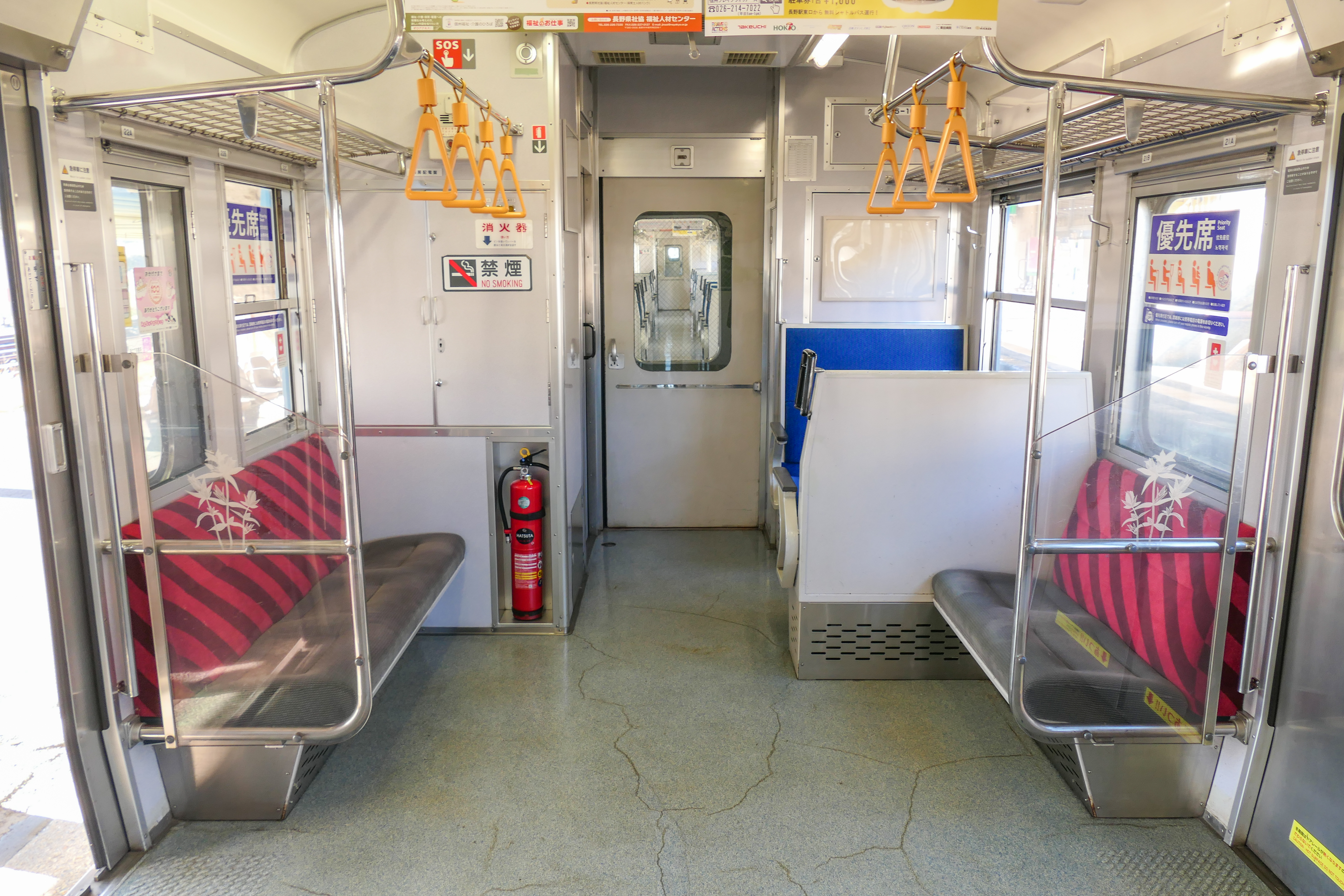
Priority seating in October 2021

=== 115-2000 series ===
Hiroshima, Shimonoseki and Shizuoka area version introduced in 1978. Specifications based on 115-1000 series.

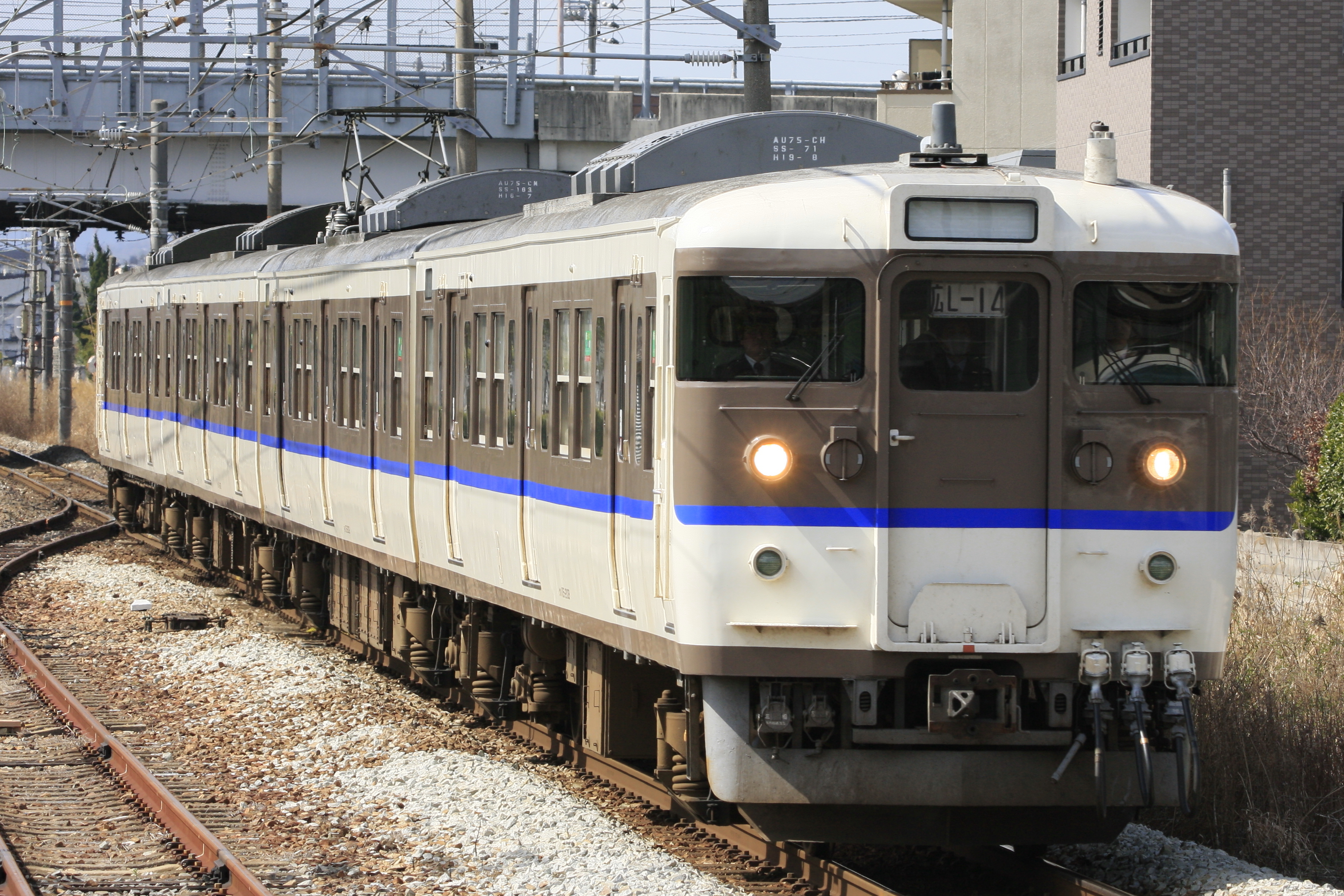
115-2000 series in March 2009

=== 115-3000 series ===
Two-door version introduced from November 1982 to replace 153 series EMUs on "Rapid" services in the Shimonoseki area.

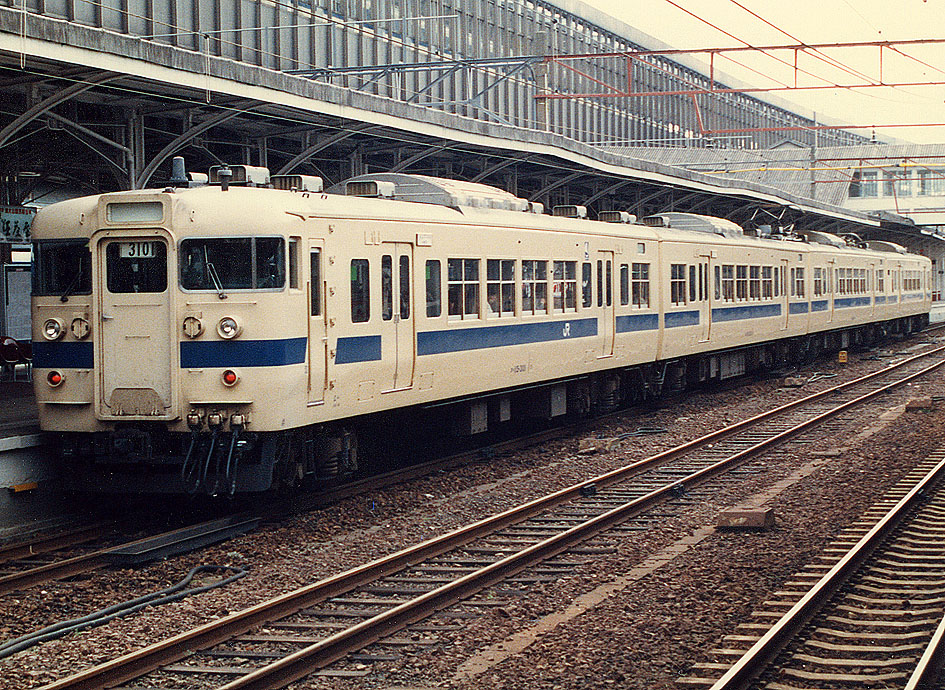
115-3000 series

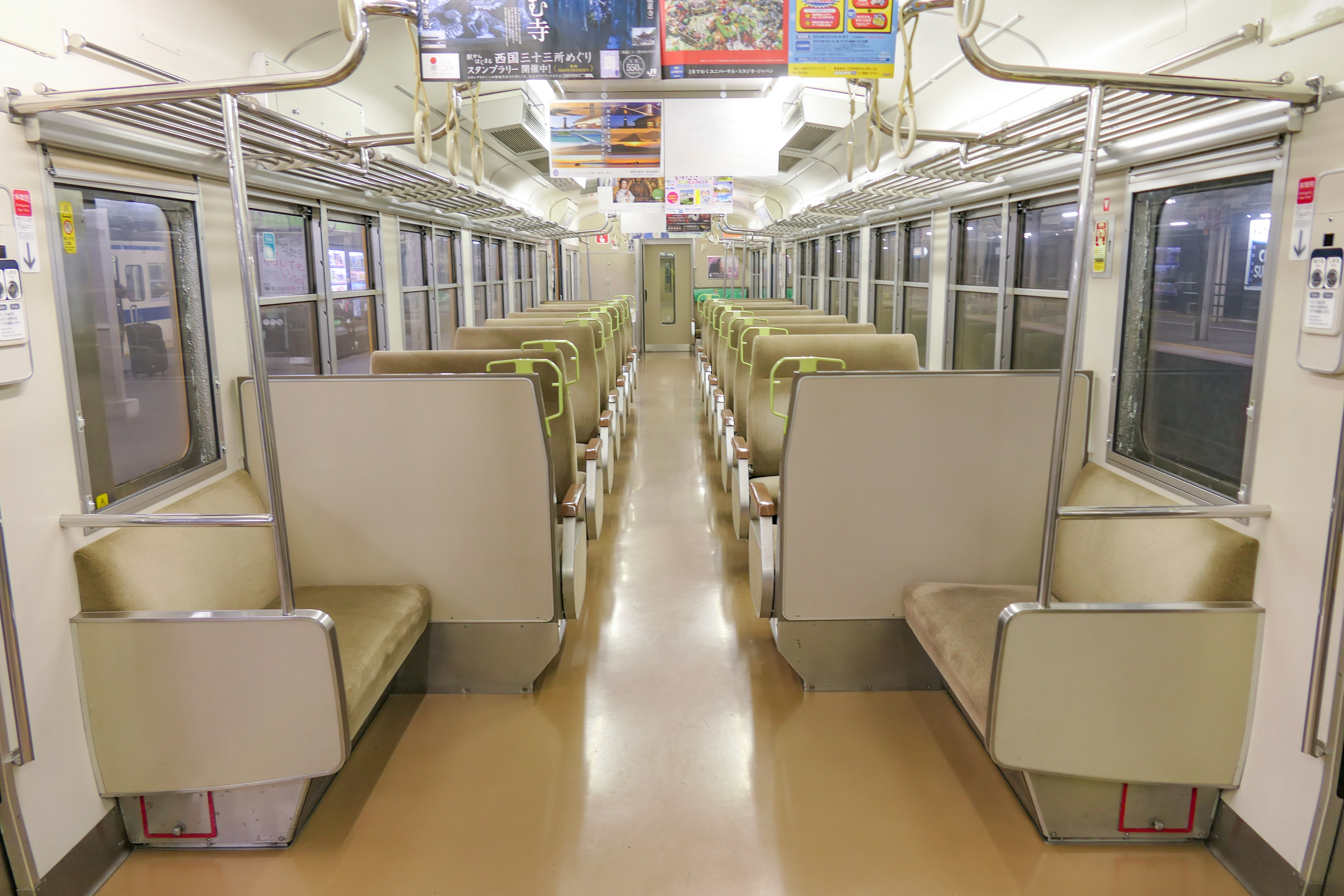
Interior view in December 2021

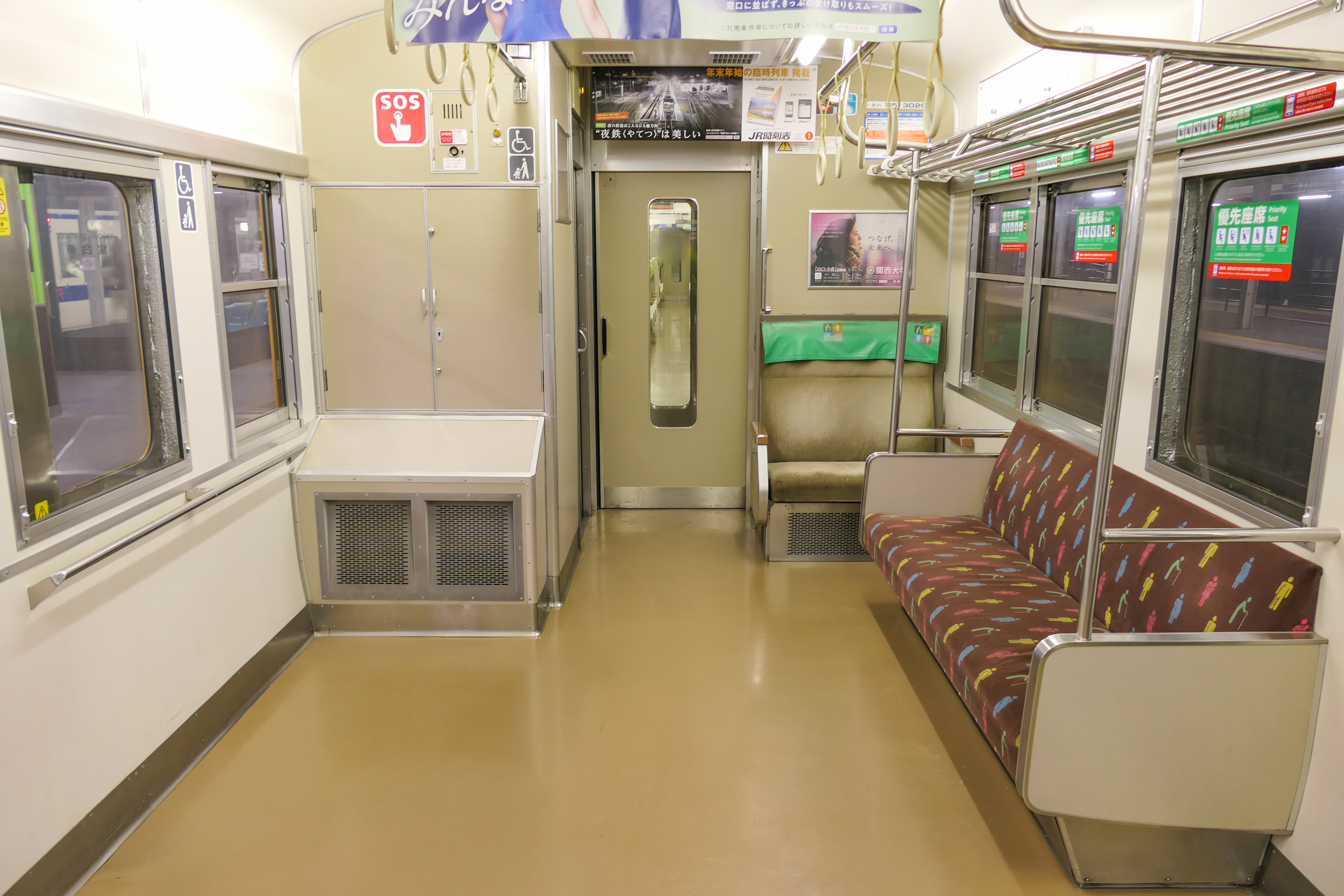
Priority seating in December 2021

=== 115-3500 series ===
Former 117 series MoHa 117 and MoHa 116 two-door cars converted from May 1992 for use in the Okayama and Hiroshima areas.

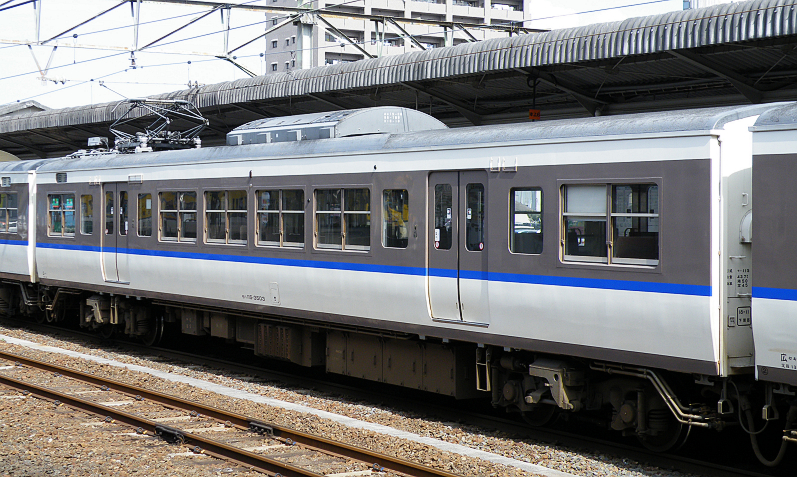
Moha115-3500 in March 2009

=== 115-6000 series ===
JR-West 2-car sets converted in 1999 by building new cabs at one end of former MoHa (non-driving motor) cars.

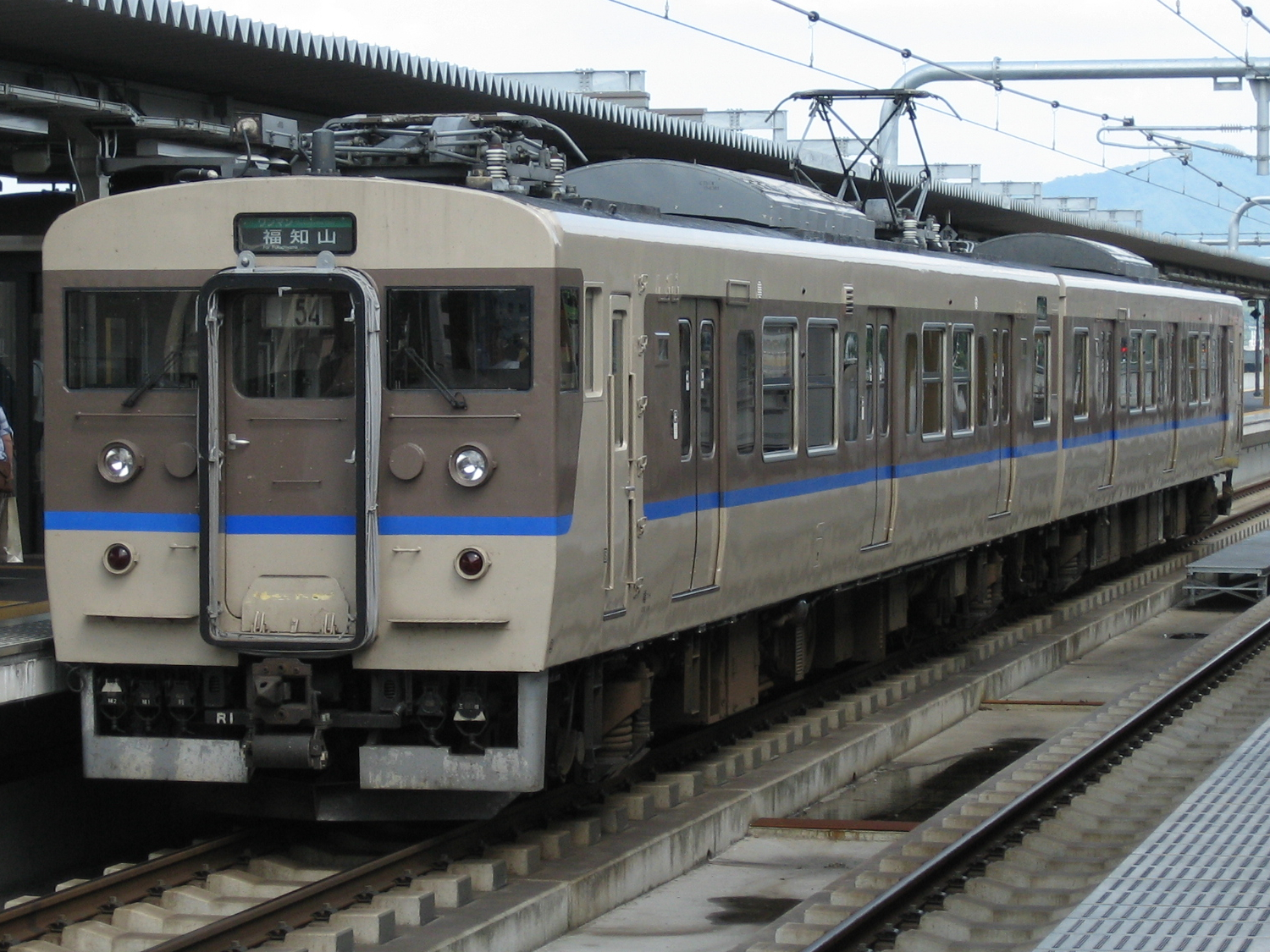
115-6000 series in August 2006

== Livery variations ==
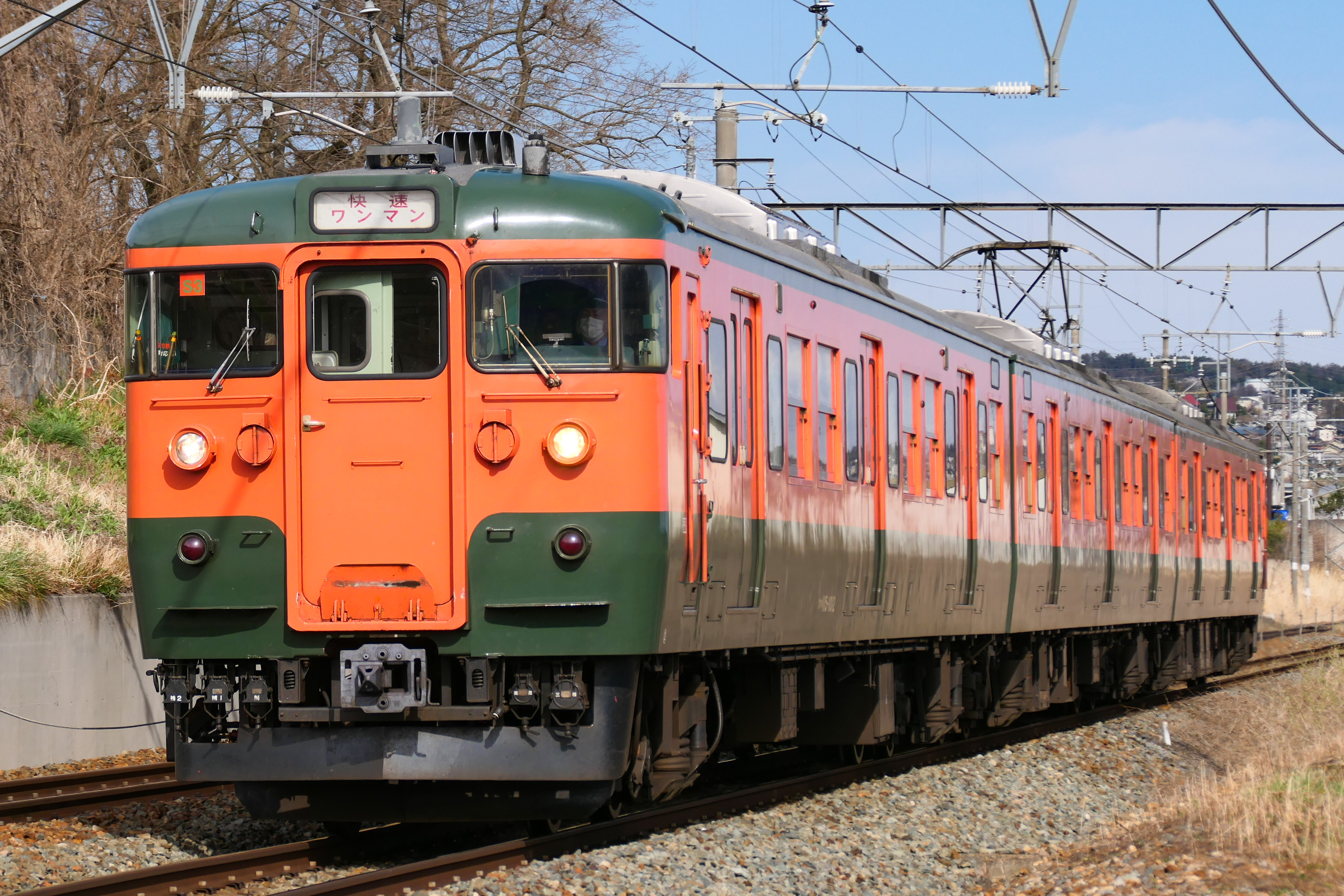
Shōnan livery in April 2022

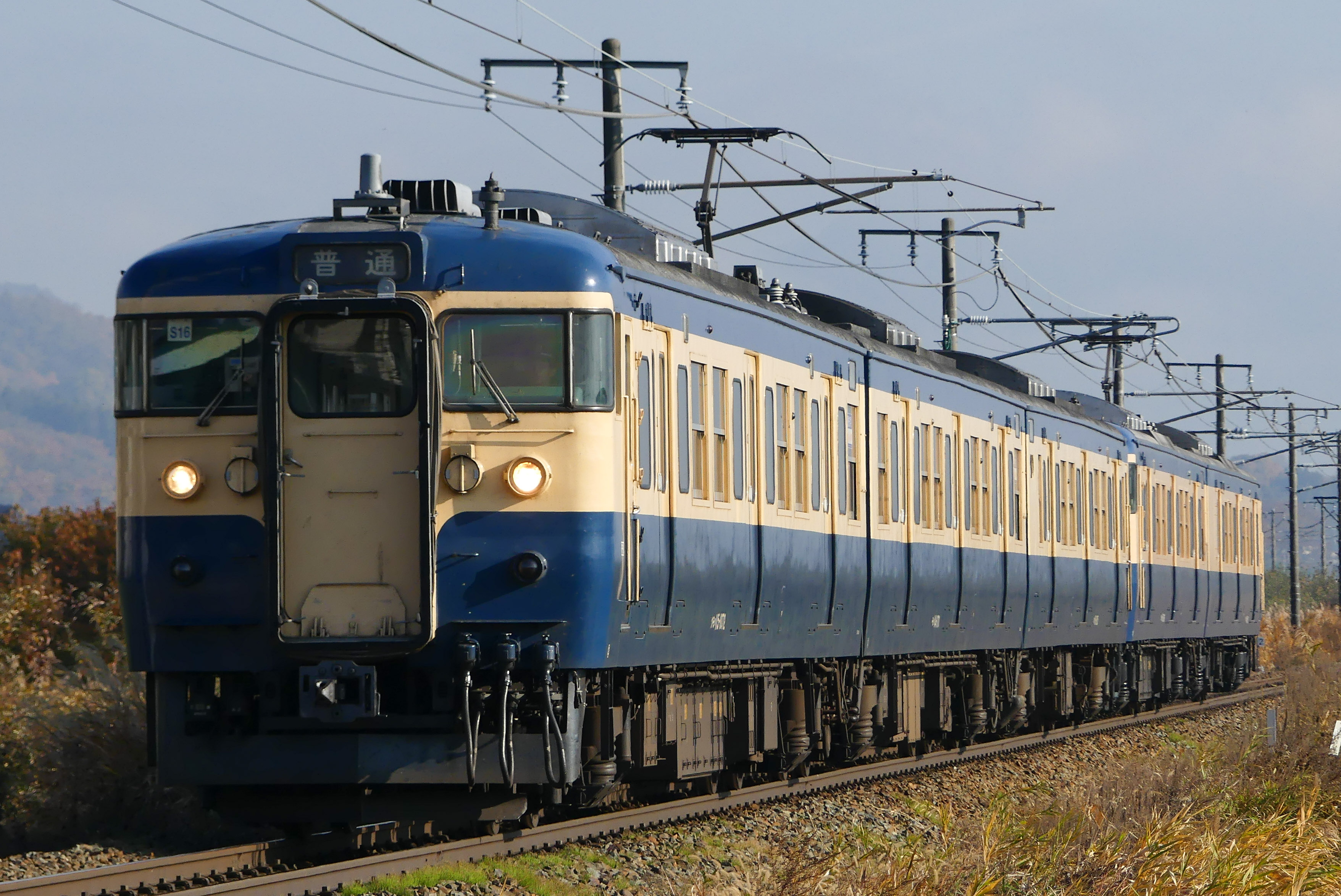
"Suka" livery in November 2018

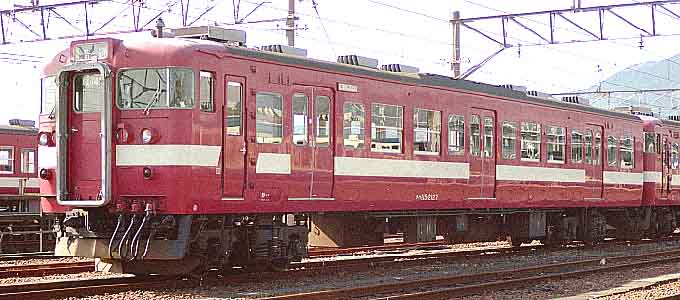
Minobu Line livery in November 1983

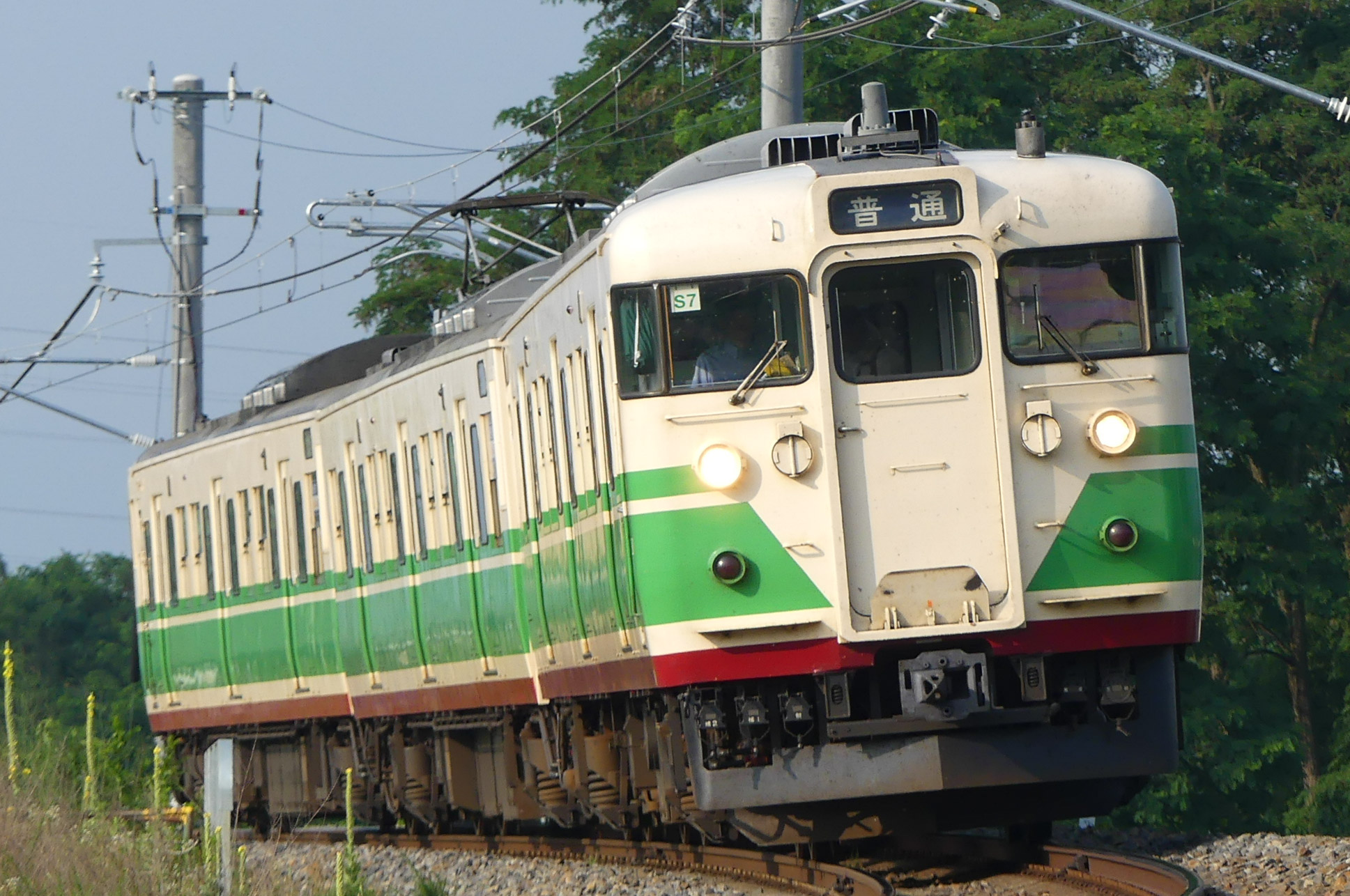
Original Nagano livery June 2018

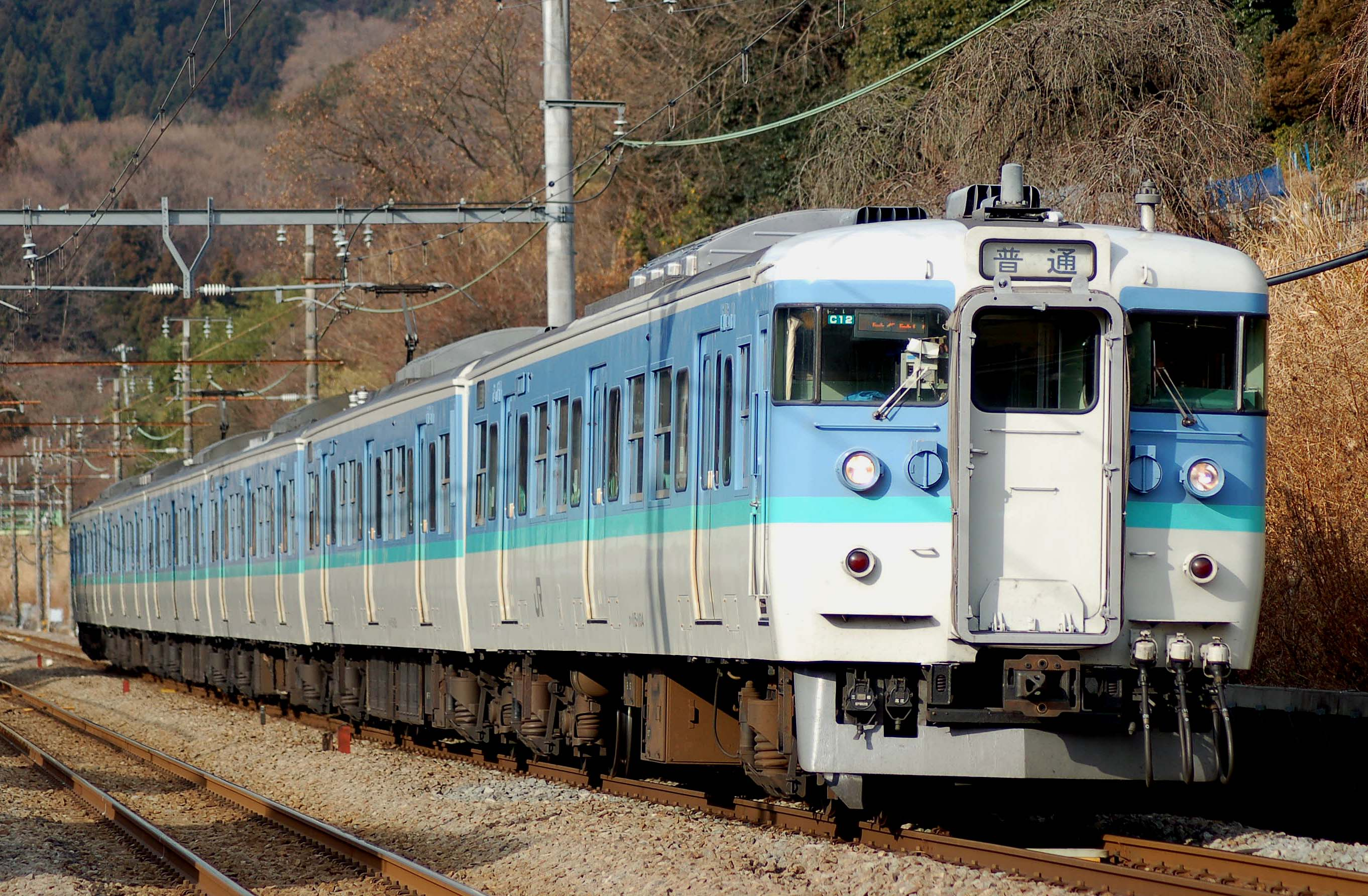
New Nagano livery in January 2008

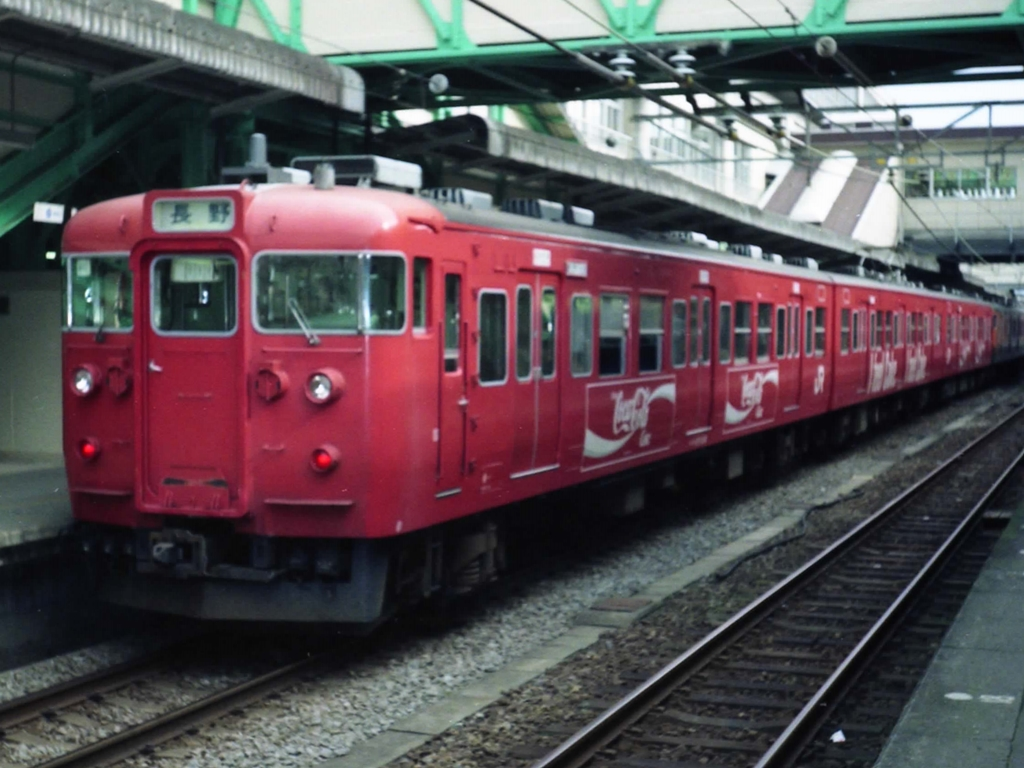
Coca-Cola livery

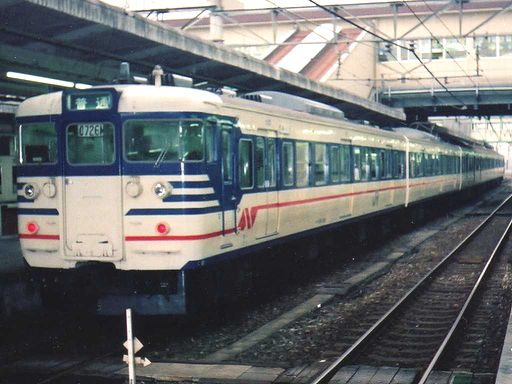
First Niigata livery in 1989

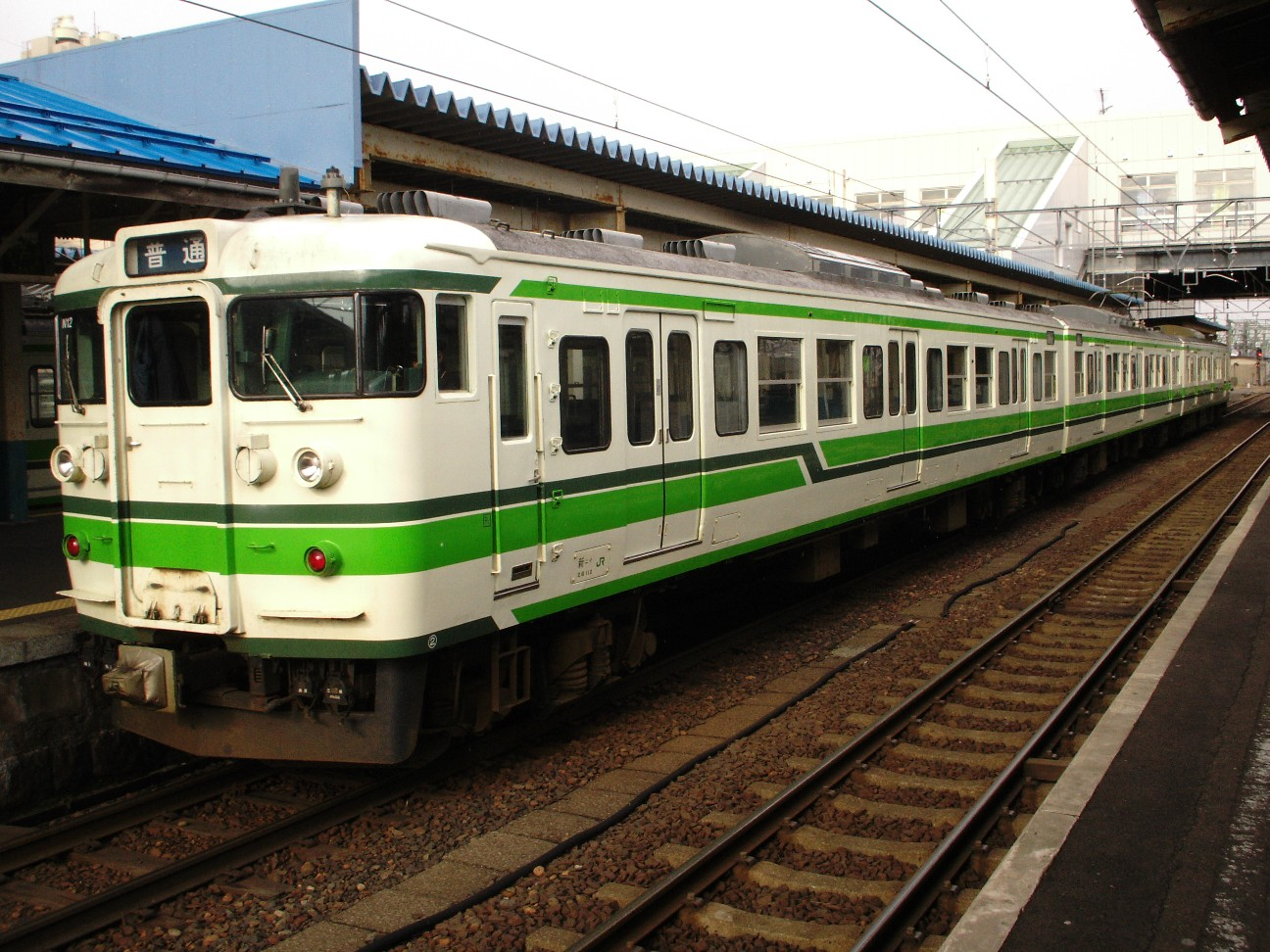
Second Niigata livery in February 2007

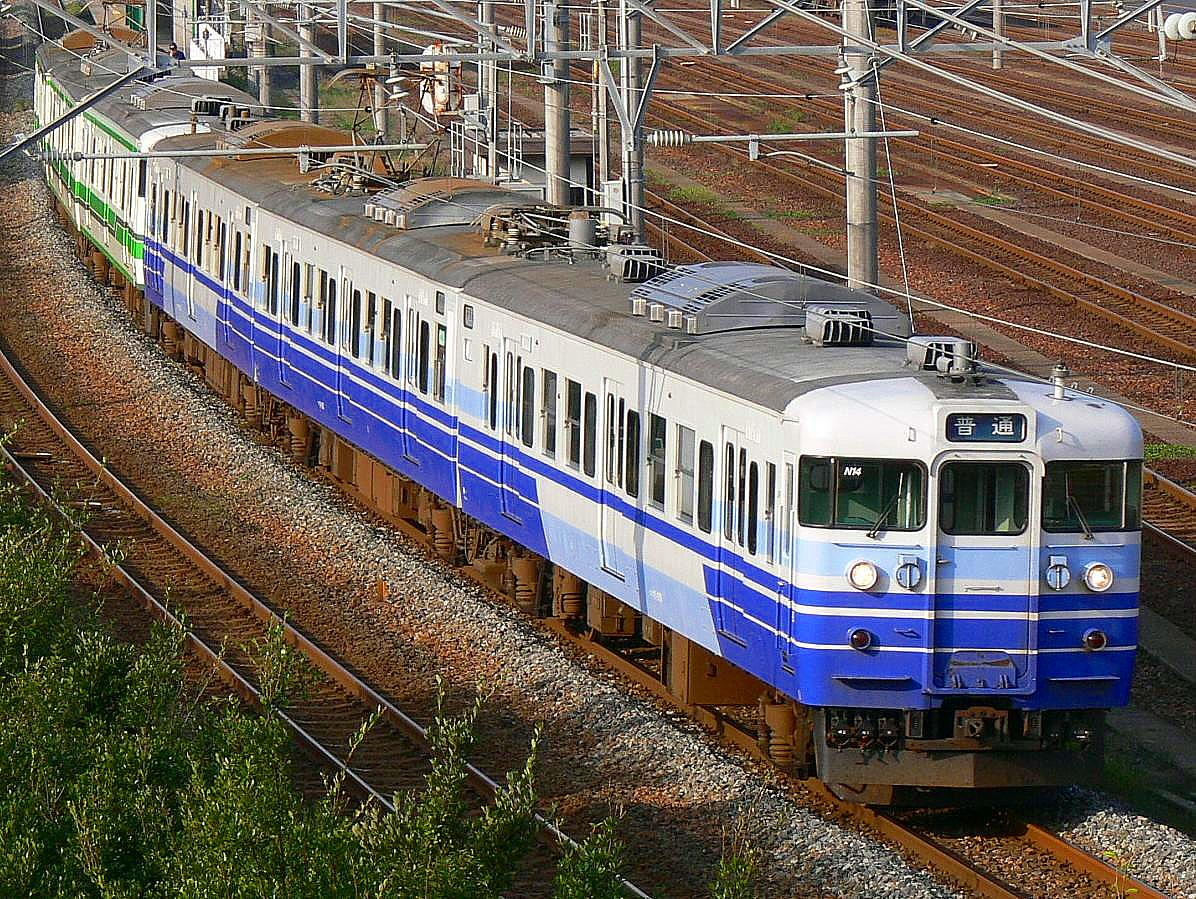
New Niigata livery in February 2007

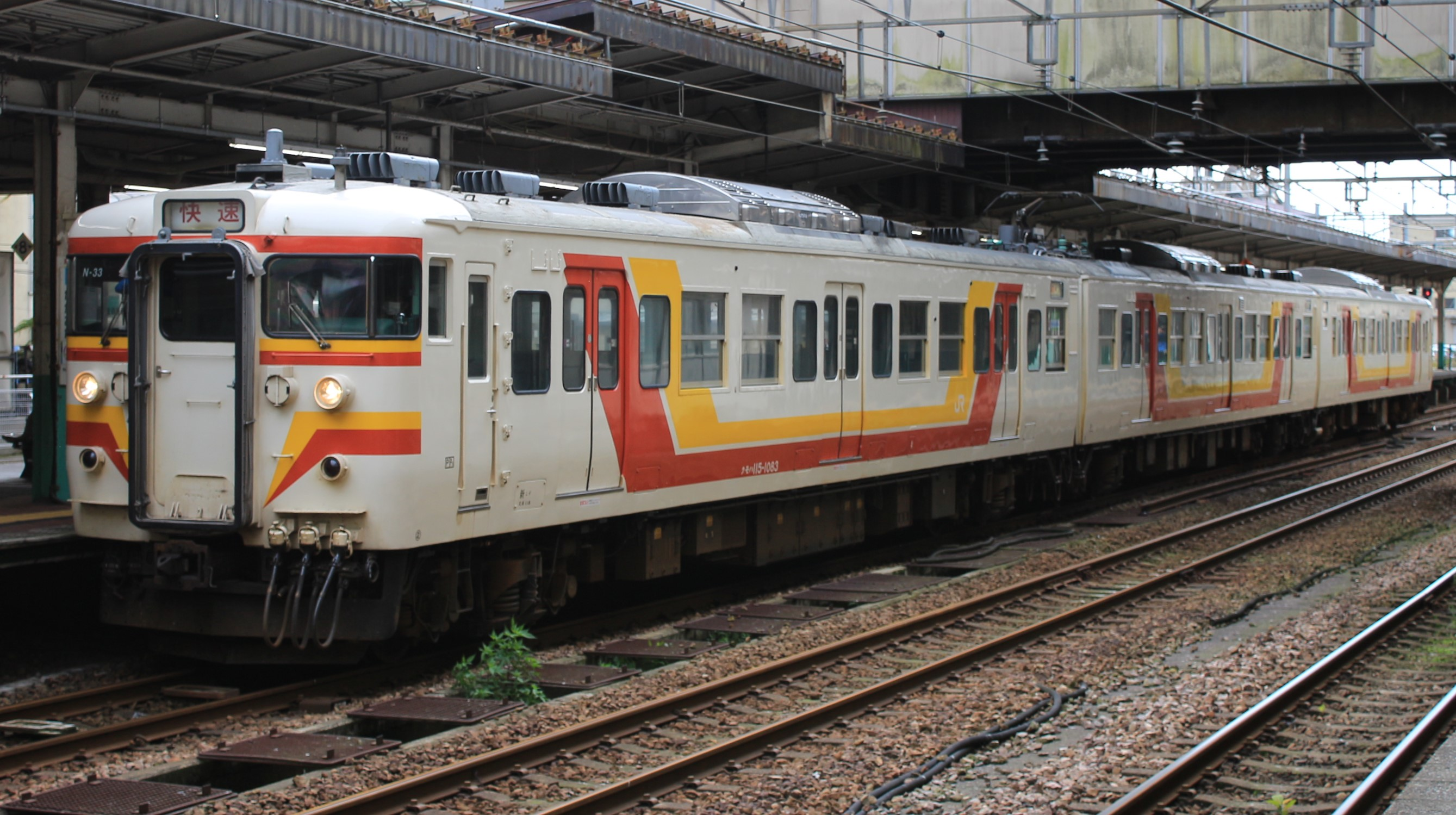
First Yahiko Line livery in October 2020

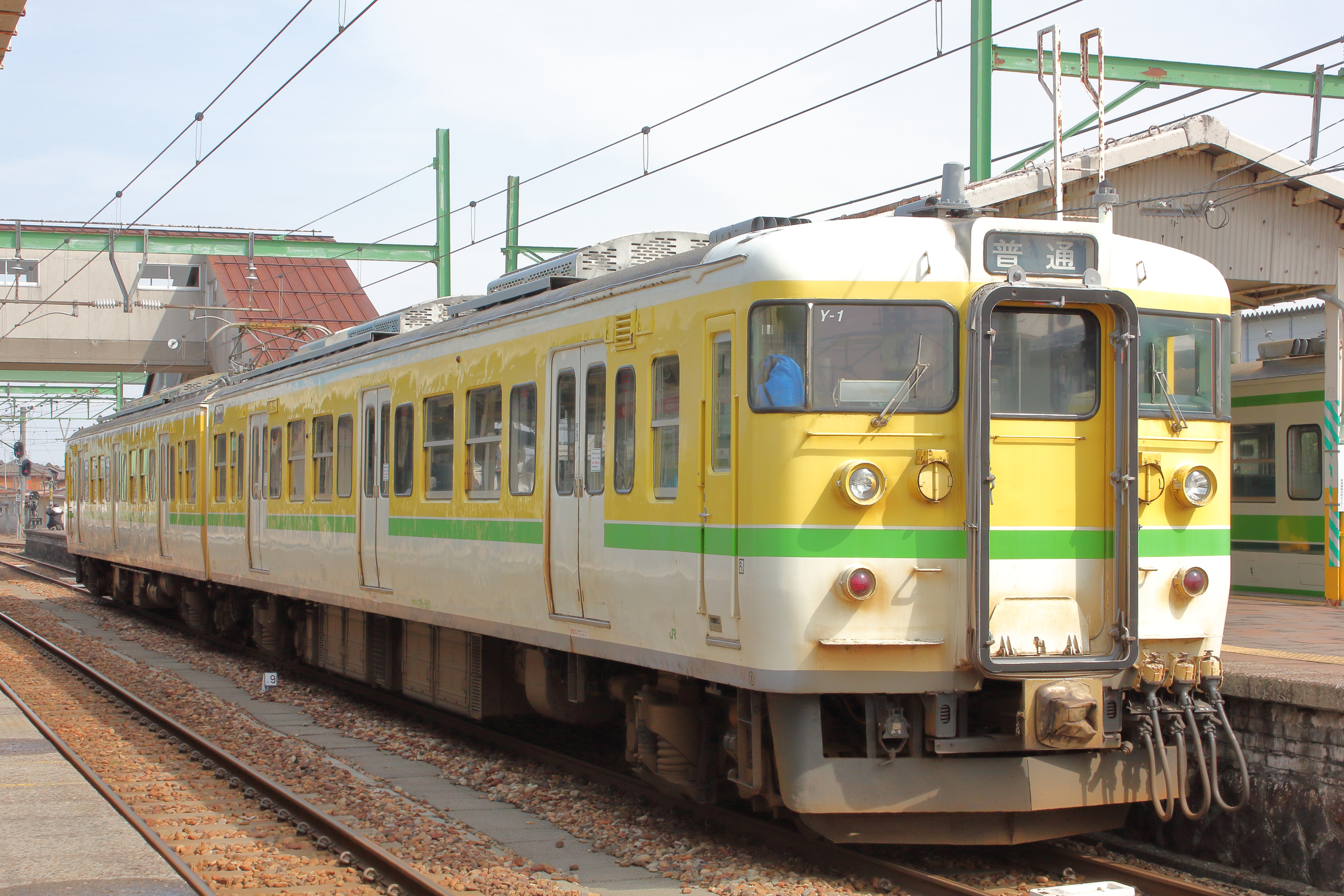
Second Yahiko Line livery in March 2015

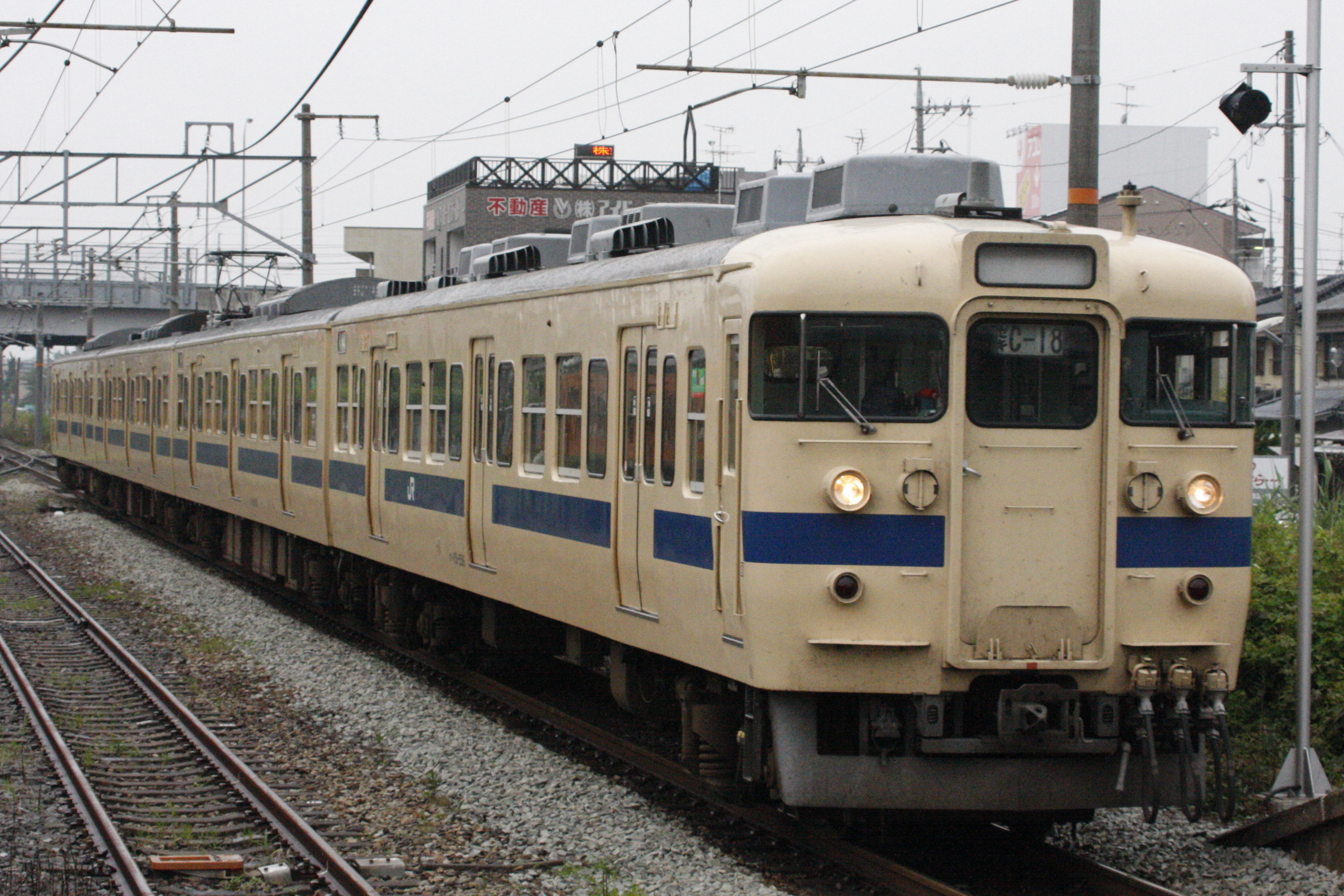
Setouchi livery in June 2008

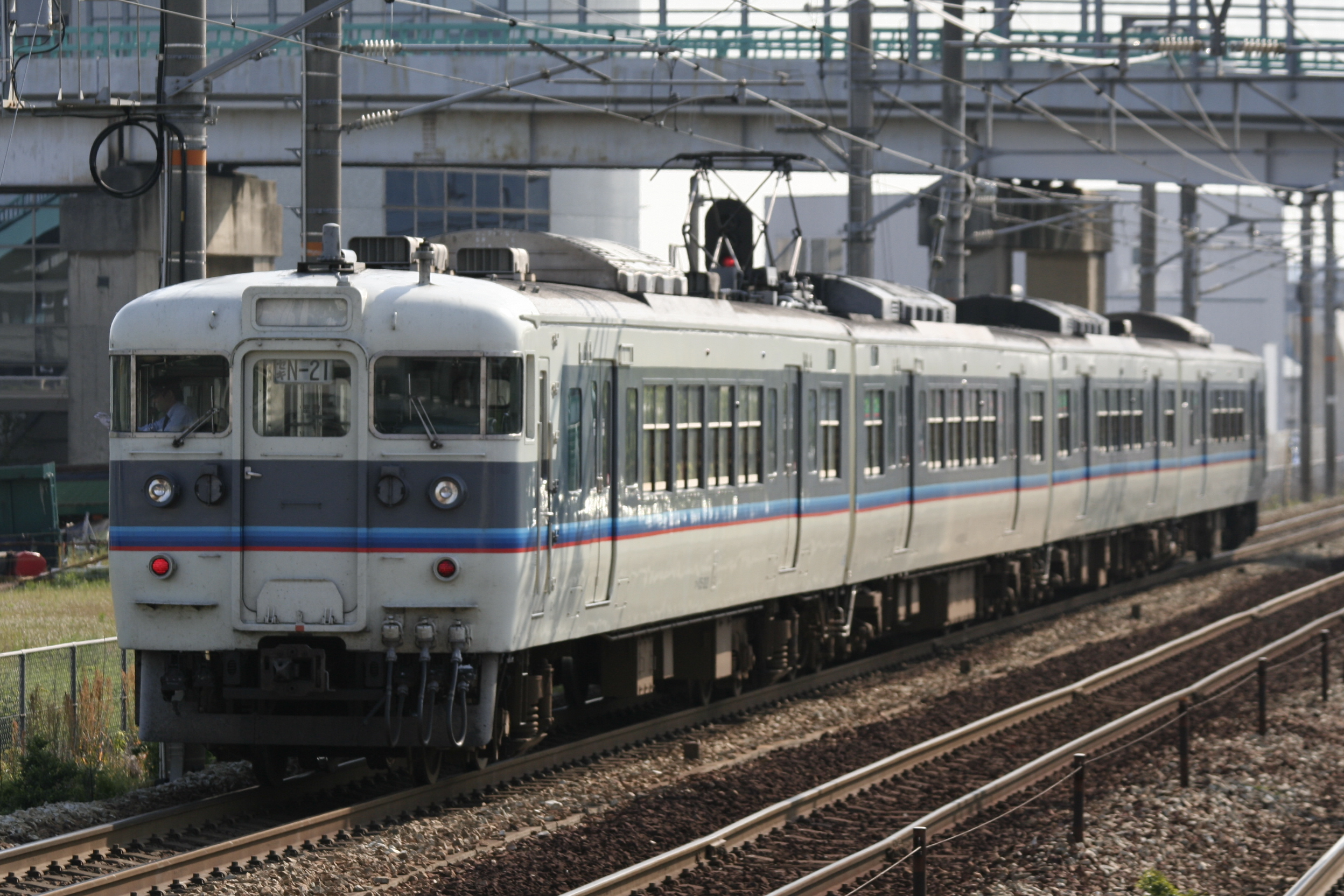
Hiroshima Rapid livery in August 2008

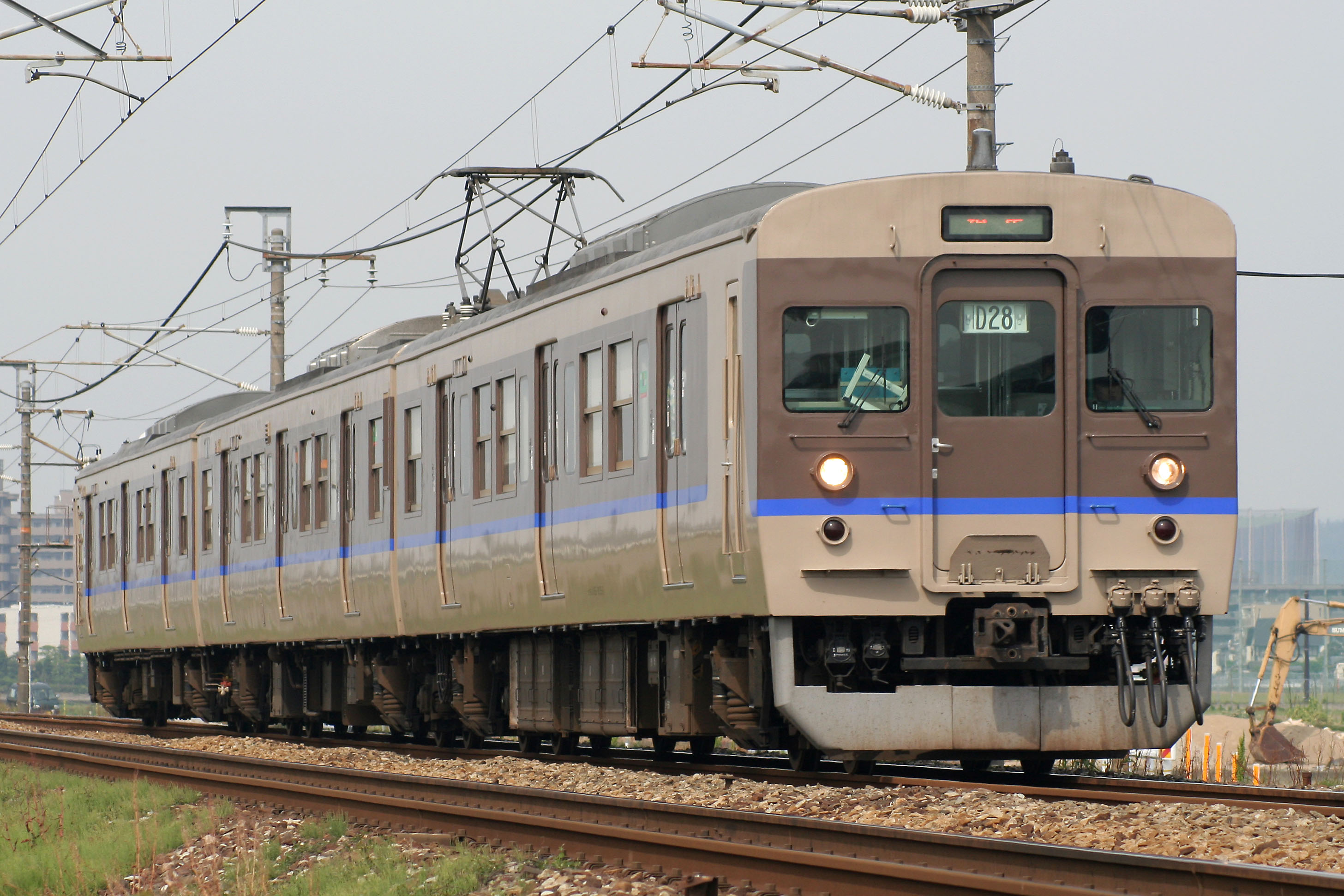
Kansai refurbished livery (115-1600 series) in May 2007

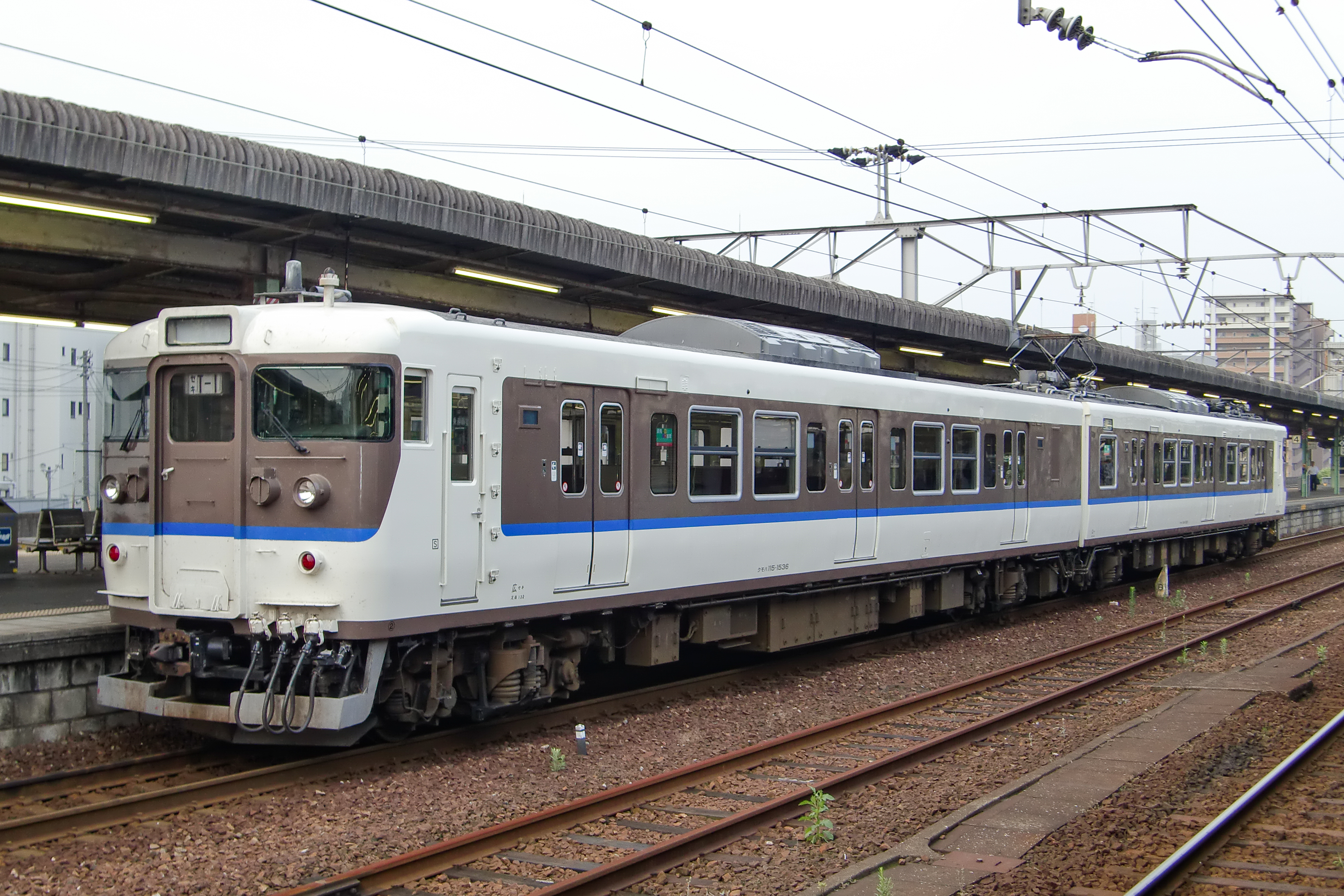
Hiroshima refurbished livery (115-1000 series) in August 2009

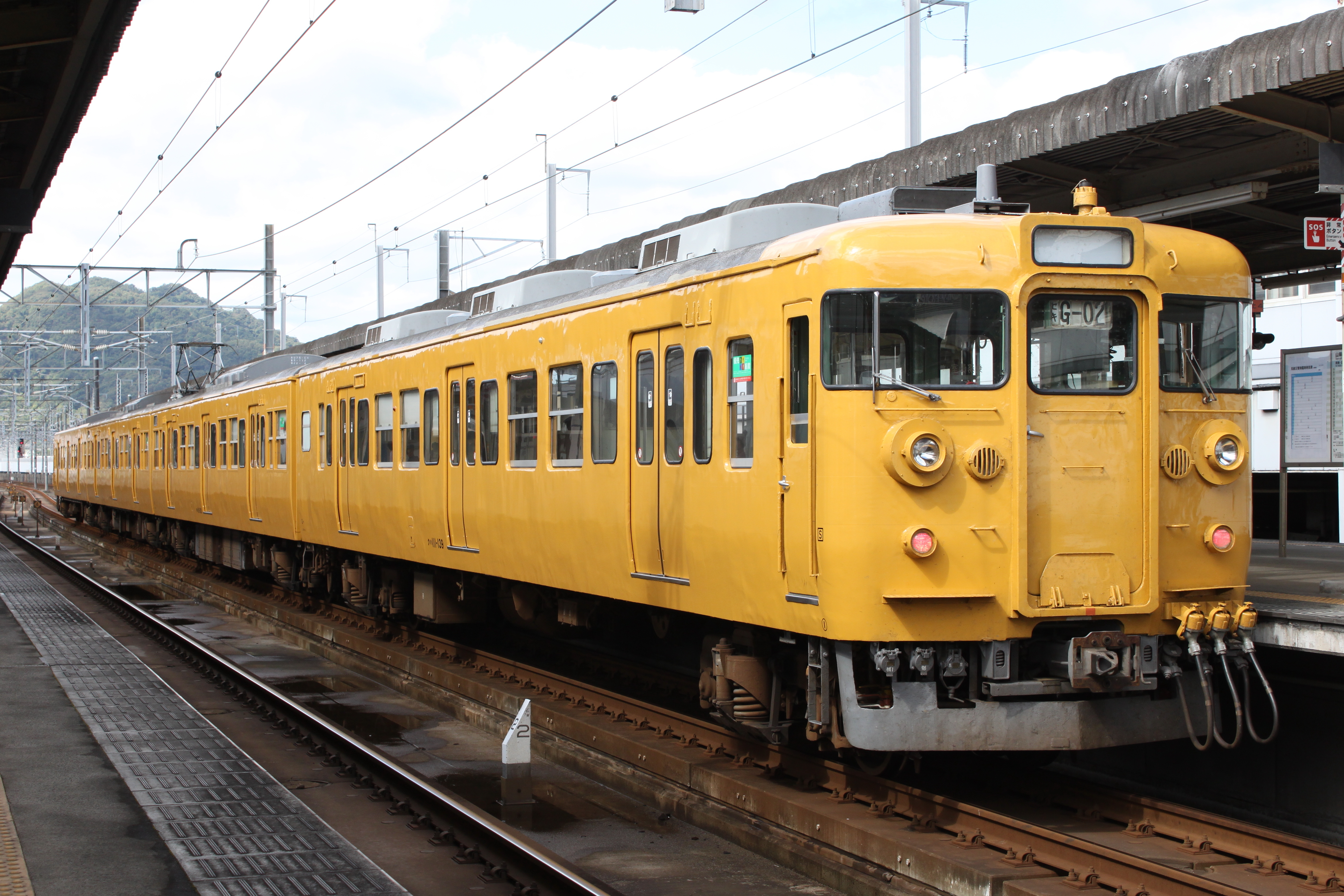
Setouchi area livery (115-600 series) in October 2010

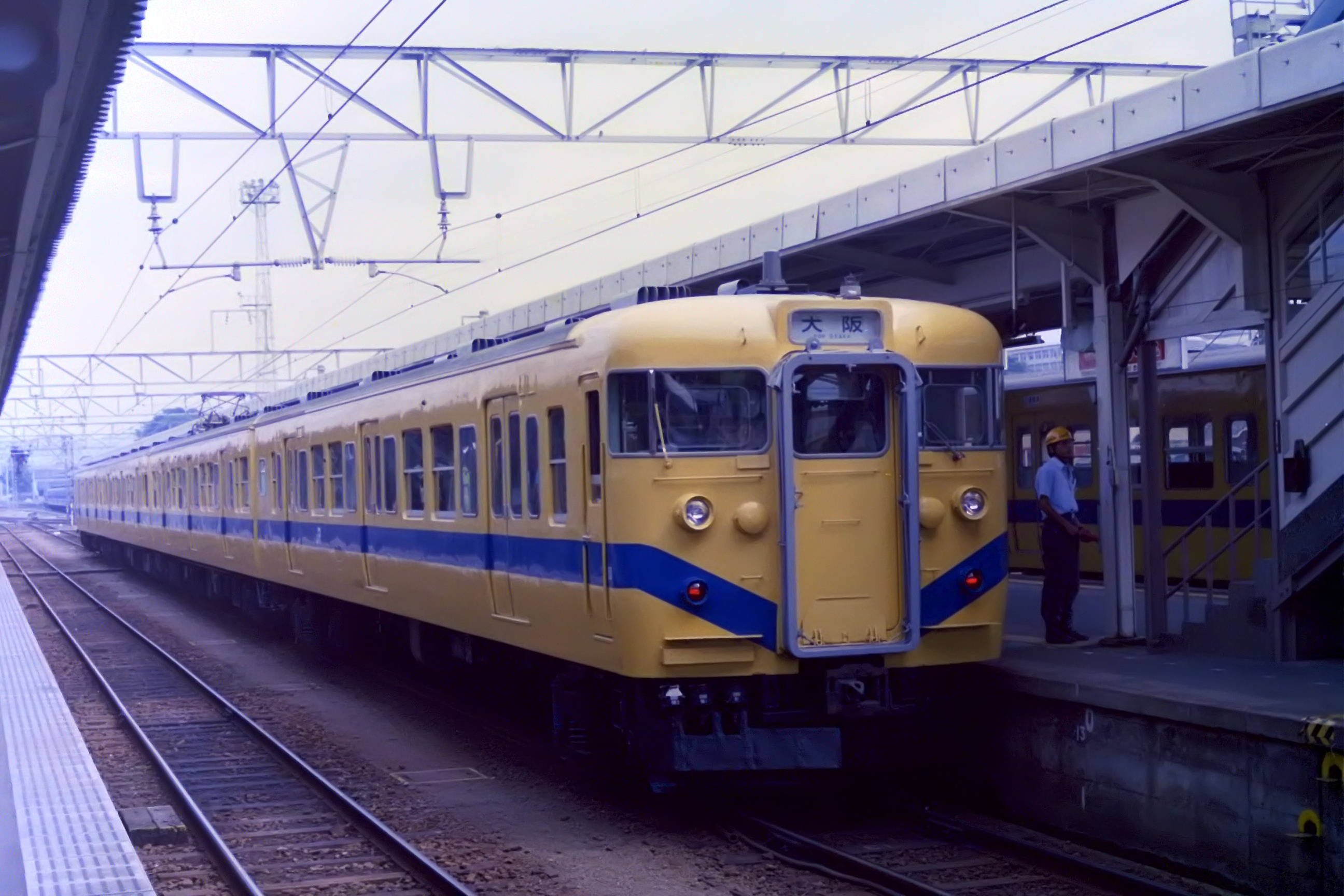
(Old) Fukuchiyama Line livery

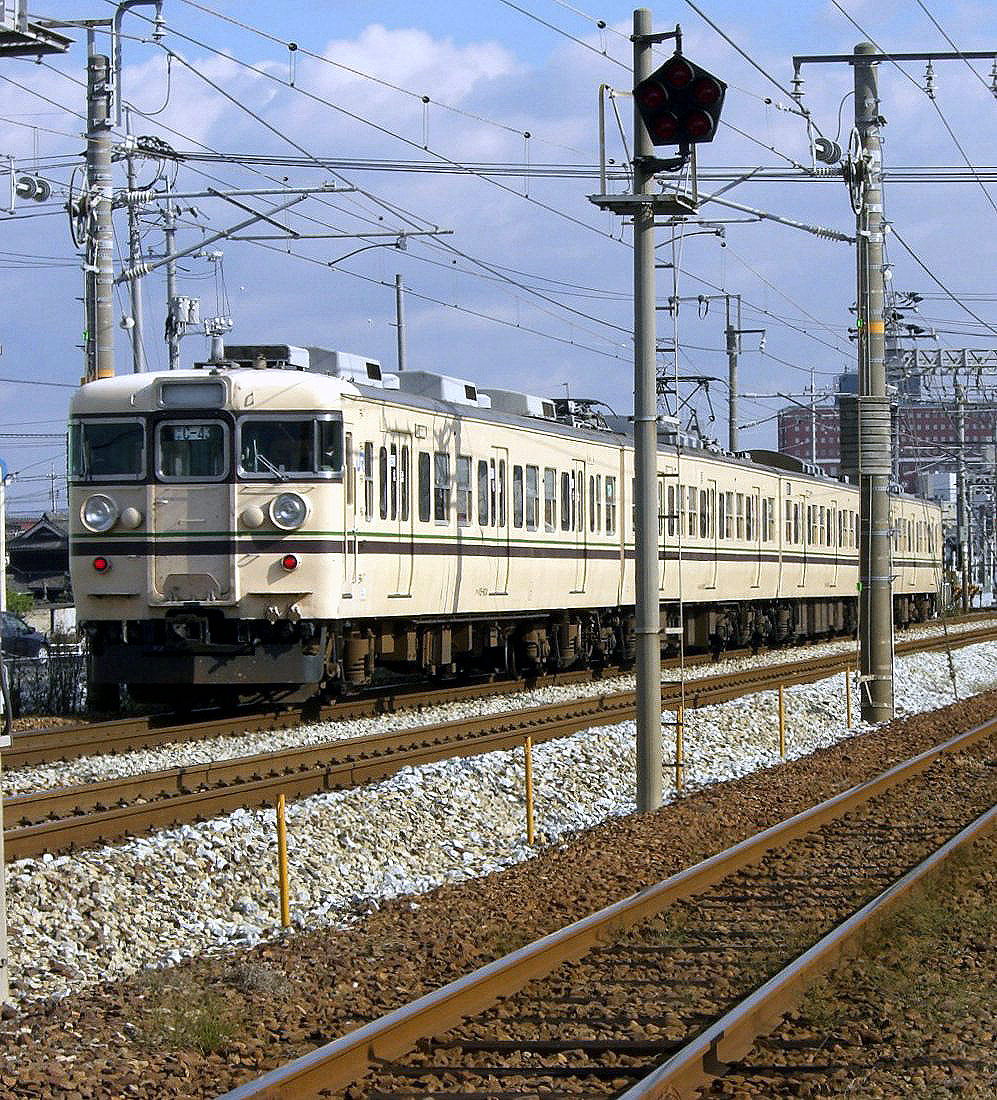
New Fukuchiyama Line livery

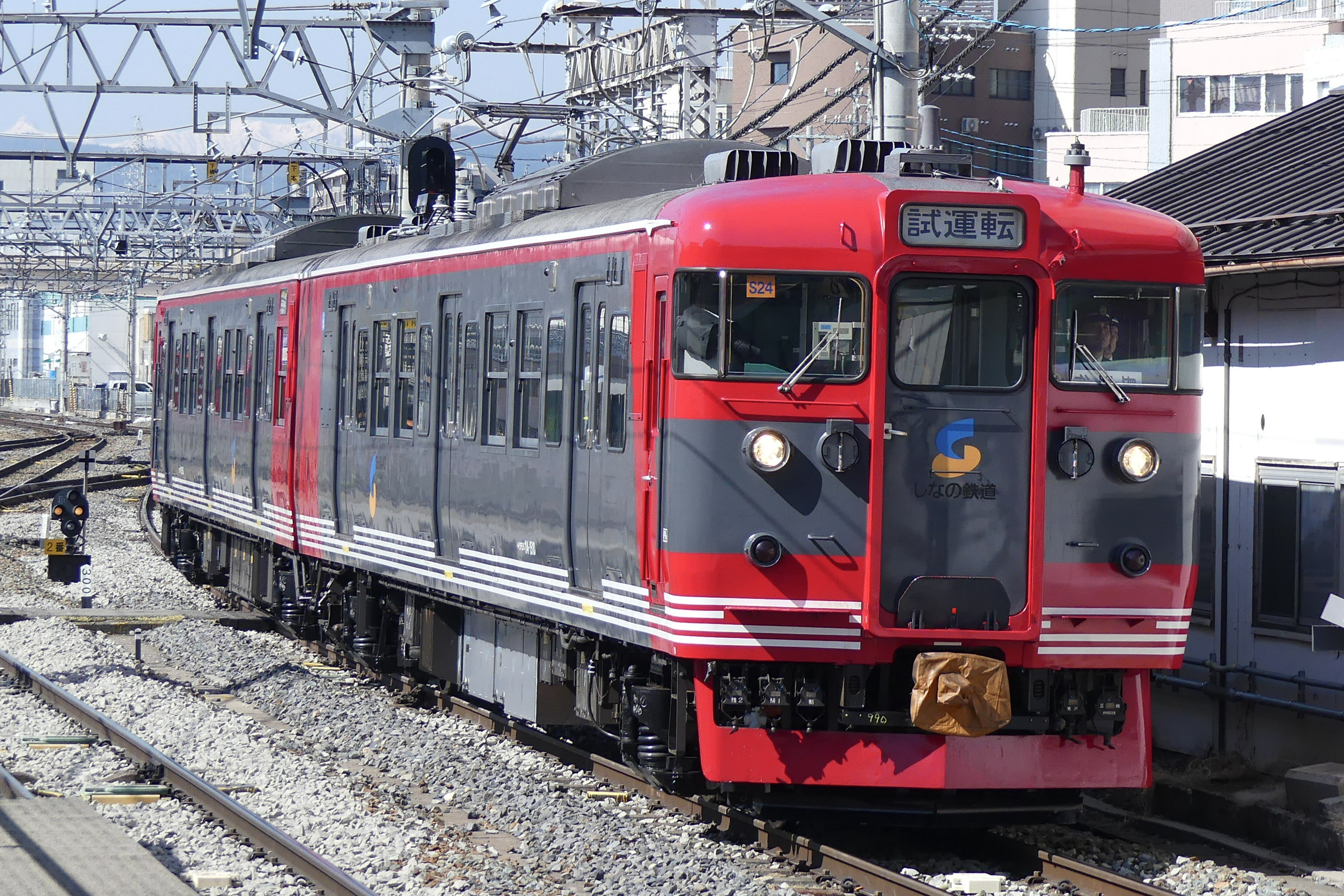
Shinano Railway livery in March 2018

=== Special liveries ===
In January 2017, Niigata-based set N3 was repainted into the original "Niigata Livery" of red and yellow formerly carried by JNR 70 series EMU trains.

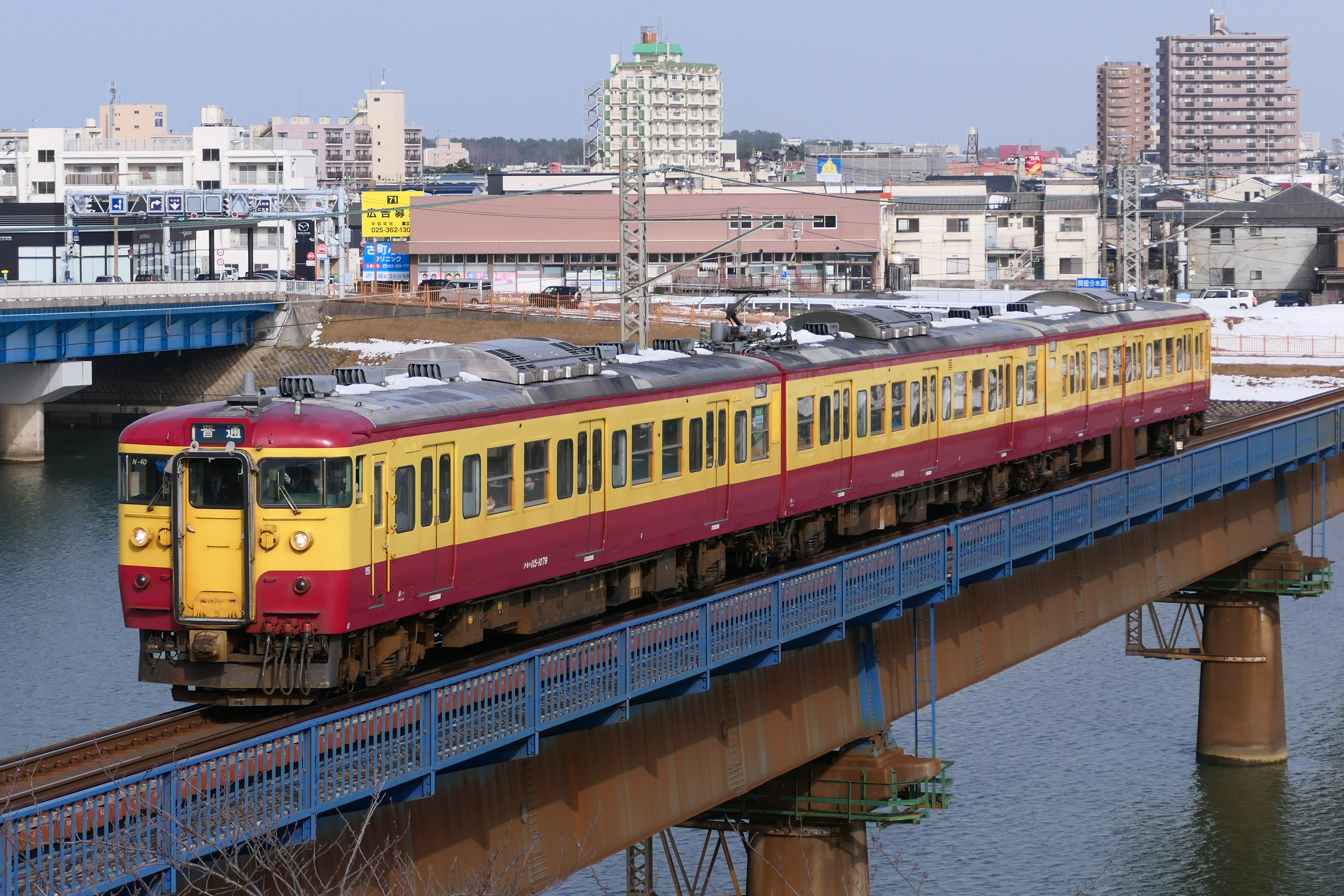
Original "Niigata Livery" in January 2021

In April 2017, Shinano Railway three-car set S7 was repainted into the original Nagano livery of cream and green as part of the Shinshu area promotional campaign to be held from July to September 2017.

In September 2017, Niigata-based set N37 was repainted in the first "Niigata area" livery.

== Withdrawal ==
Withdrawals first begun in 1985 following the introduction of 211 series. The 115 series were gradually phased out on some services. The first units were scrapped in 1987.

== Preserved examples ==
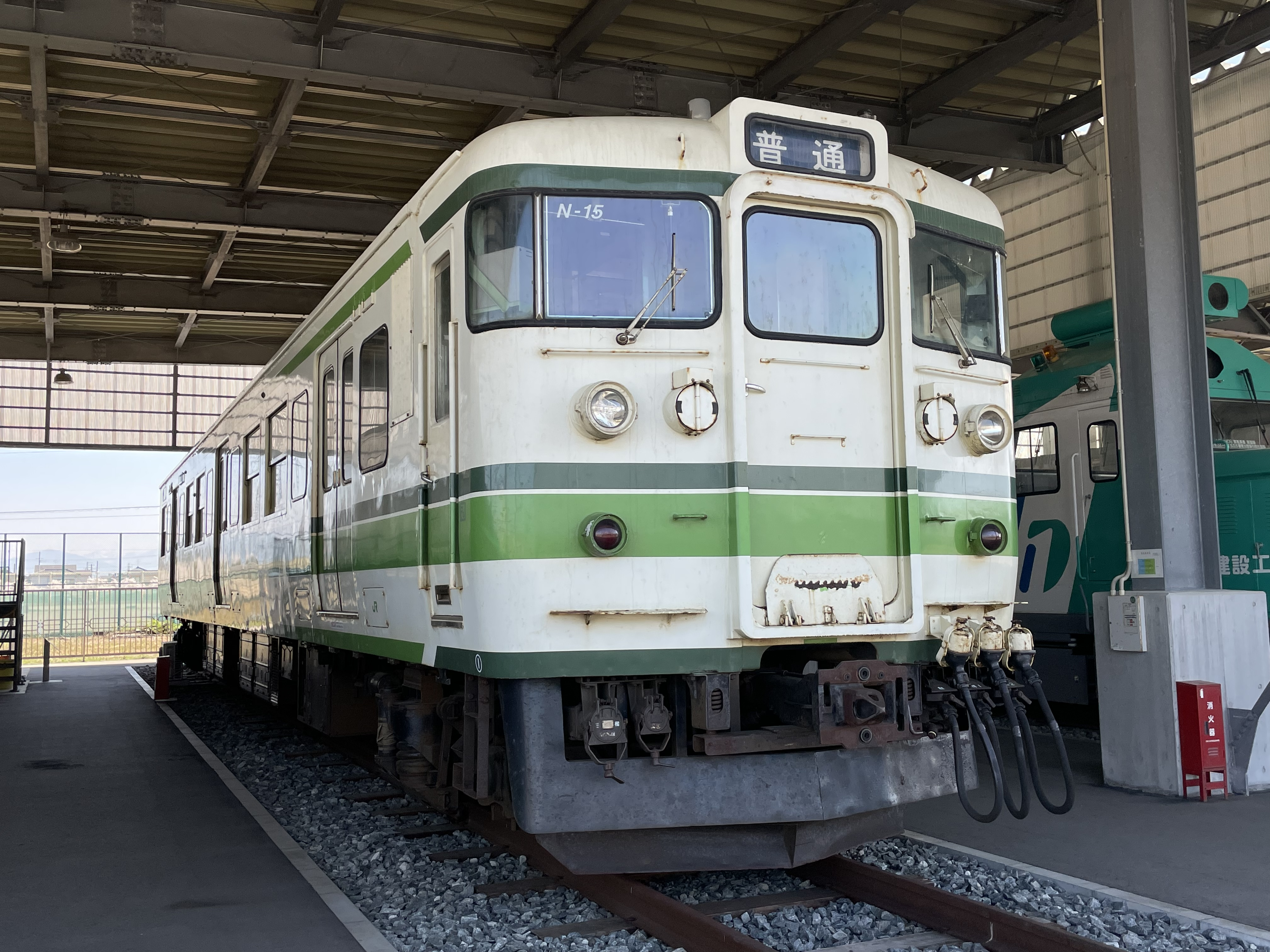
KuMoHa 115 1061 at the Niitsu Railway Museum

Former JR East end car KuMoHa 115 1061 is scheduled to be displayed at the Niigata City Niitsu Railway Museum in Niitsu, Niigata between July and September 2017. Car KuHa 115 1106 is preserved at an onsen in Chikuma, Nagano.
