= 80 series (disambiguation) =

The 80 series was a type of electric multiple unit train operated by Japanese National Railways from 1950 to 1983.

80 series may also refer to:

- KiHa 80 series, a type of diesel multiple unit train operated by Japanese railways from 1960 to 2002
- HP Series 80, a range of scientific desktop computers produced by Hewlett-Packard
- 80 series Toyota Land Cruiser, a 1990 vehicle model
