= 80 series =

Japanese electric multiple unit train type

- A JNR 80-0 series train at Nakatsugawa Station on the Chūō Main Line in 1979
- In service: 1950–1983
- Number built: 652 vehicles
- Number preserved: 2 vehicles

Specifications
- Car body construction: Steel
- Car length: 20 m (65 ft 7 in)
- Electric system: 1,500 V DC
- Current collection: Overhead catenary
- Track gauge: 1,067 mm (3 ft 6 in)

The 80 series (80系, 80-kei) was an electric multiple unit (EMU) train type operated by Japanese National Railways (JNR) from 1950 until 1983. A total of 652 vehicles were built.

== Variants ==
- 80-0 series
- 80-100/200 series: Trains introduced from 1956 with increased seat pitch and improvements for use in cold regions
- 80-300 series: Trains with all-steel bodies
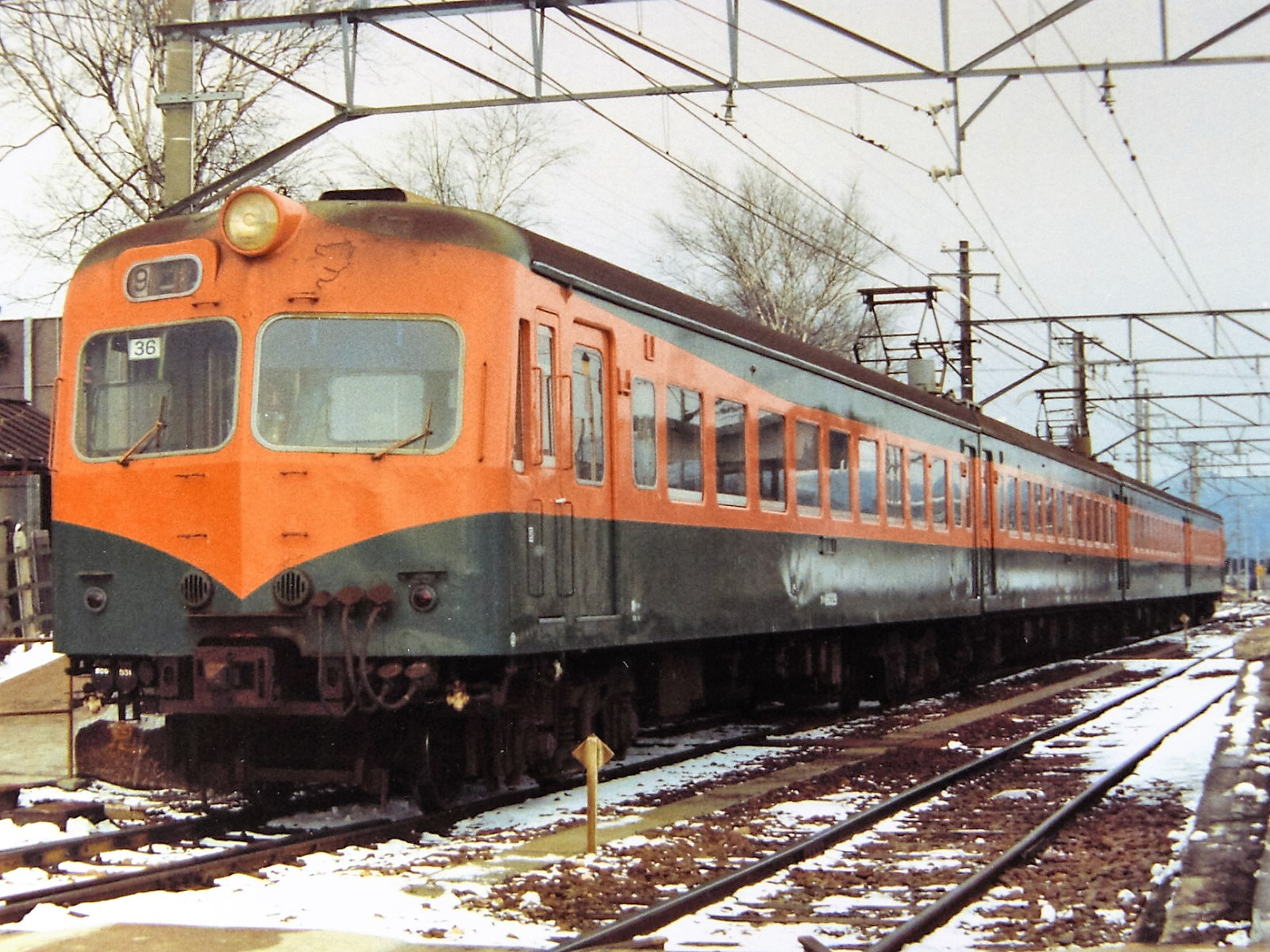
An all-steel-bodied 80-300 series unit in 1983

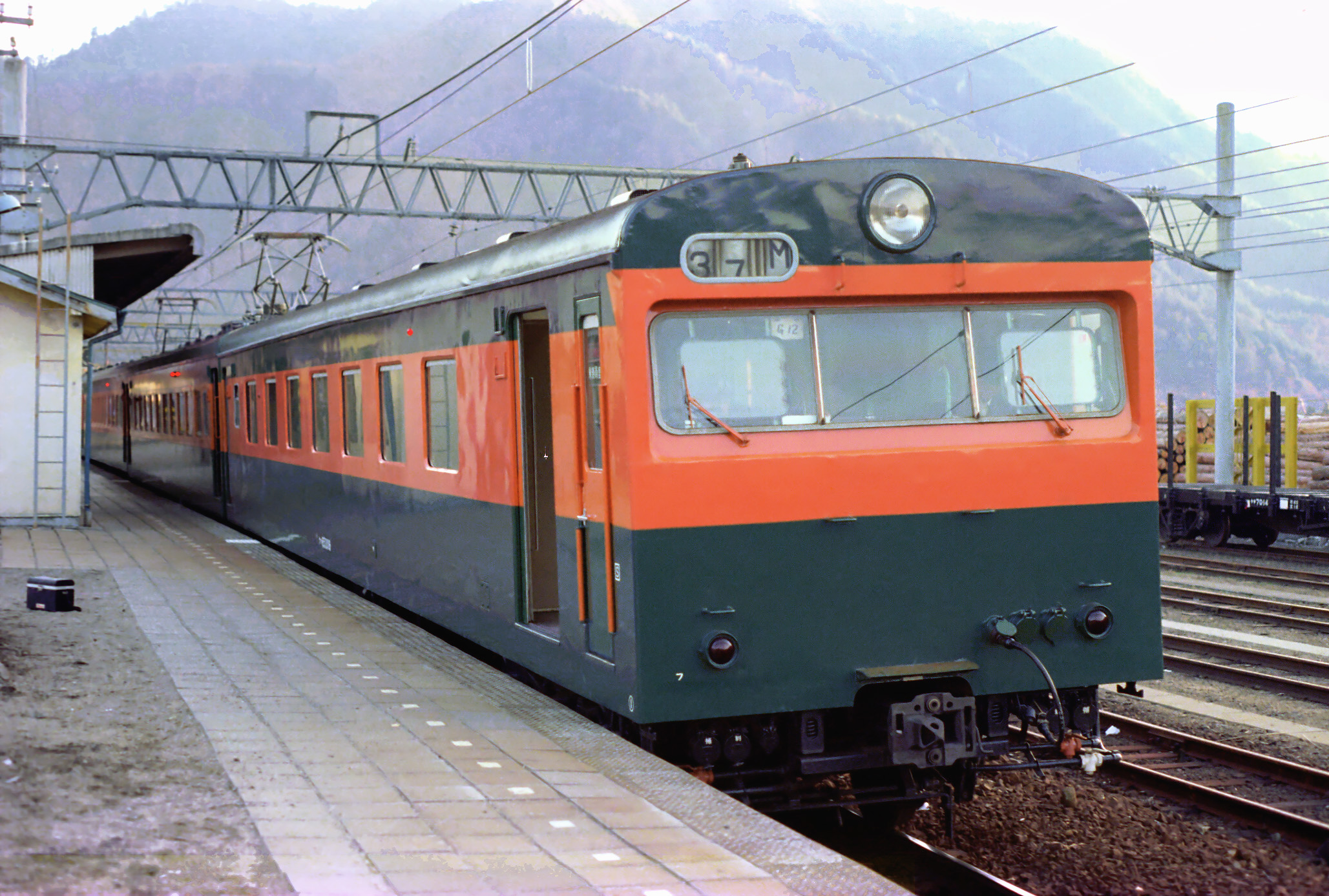
An all-steel-bodied 80-300 series unit in 1979 (Some of the cars are similar to the 72-970 series cars)

== Interior ==
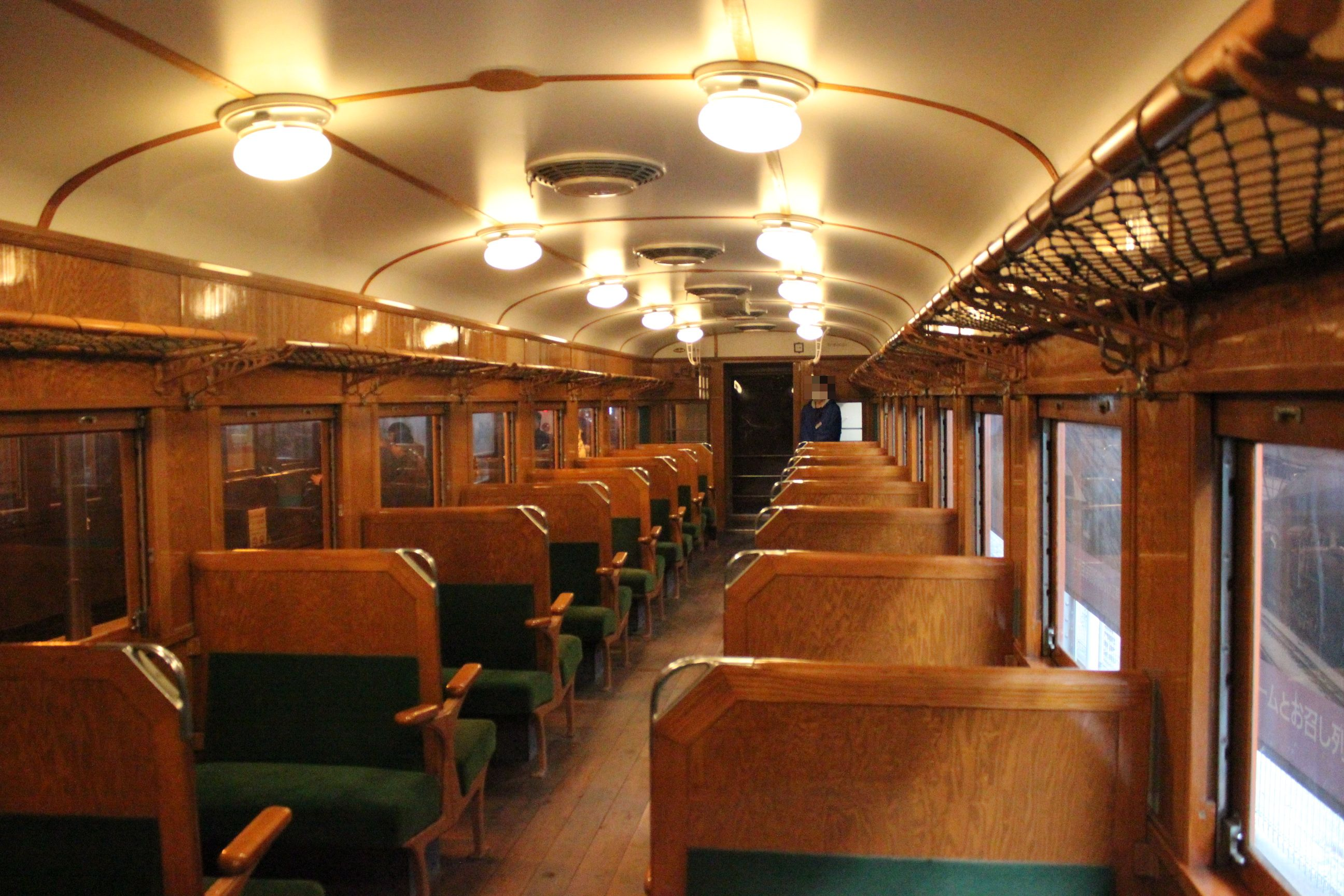
The Interior of preserved car MoHa 80001

== Preserved examples ==
Two first-batch 80 series cars, driving car KuHa 86001 and intermediate car MoHa 80001, are preserved on display at the Kyoto Railway Museum in Kyoto.

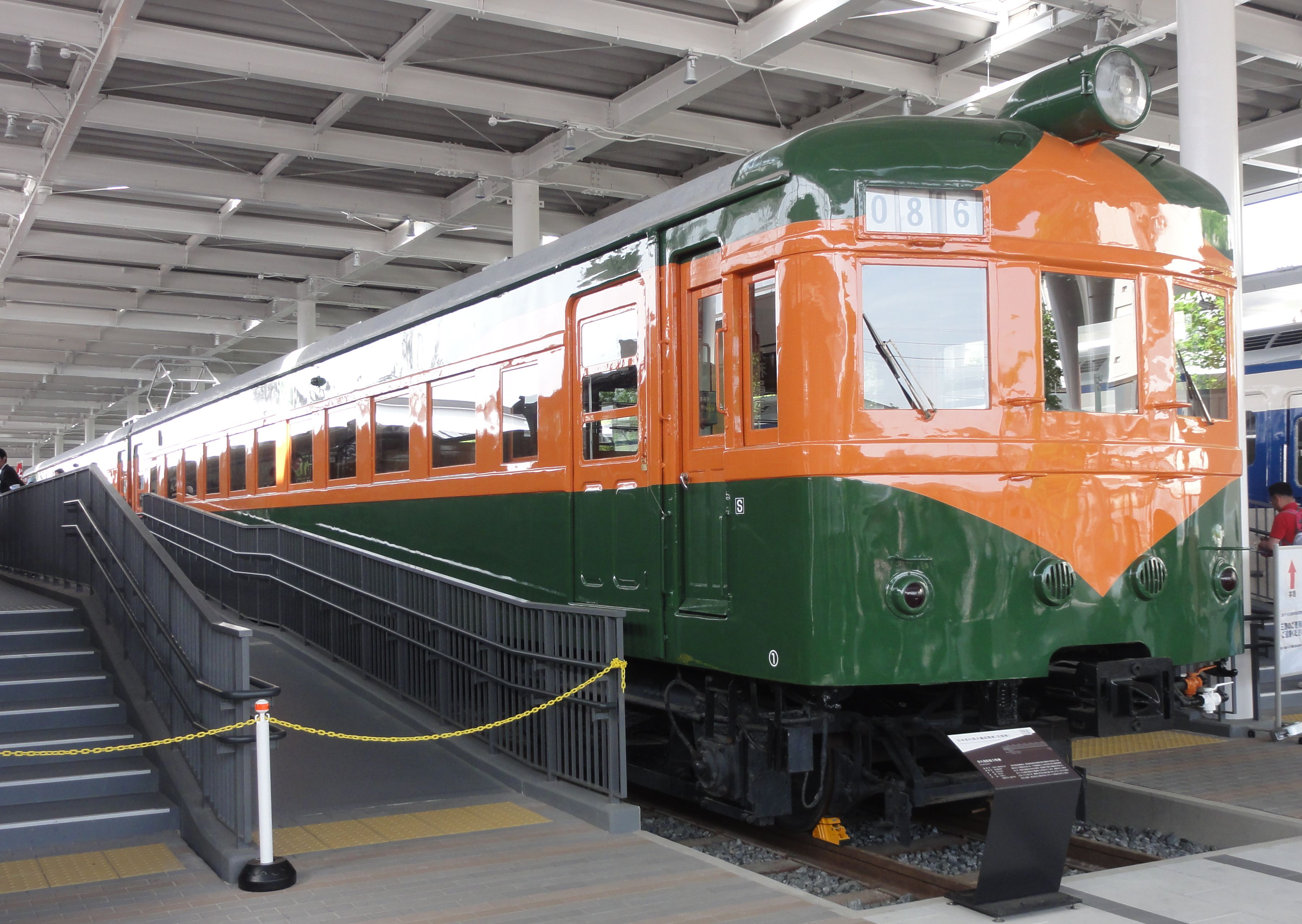
KuHa 86001 on display at the Kyoto Railway Museum in May 2016
