= 205 series =

Train type operated in Japan and Indonesia

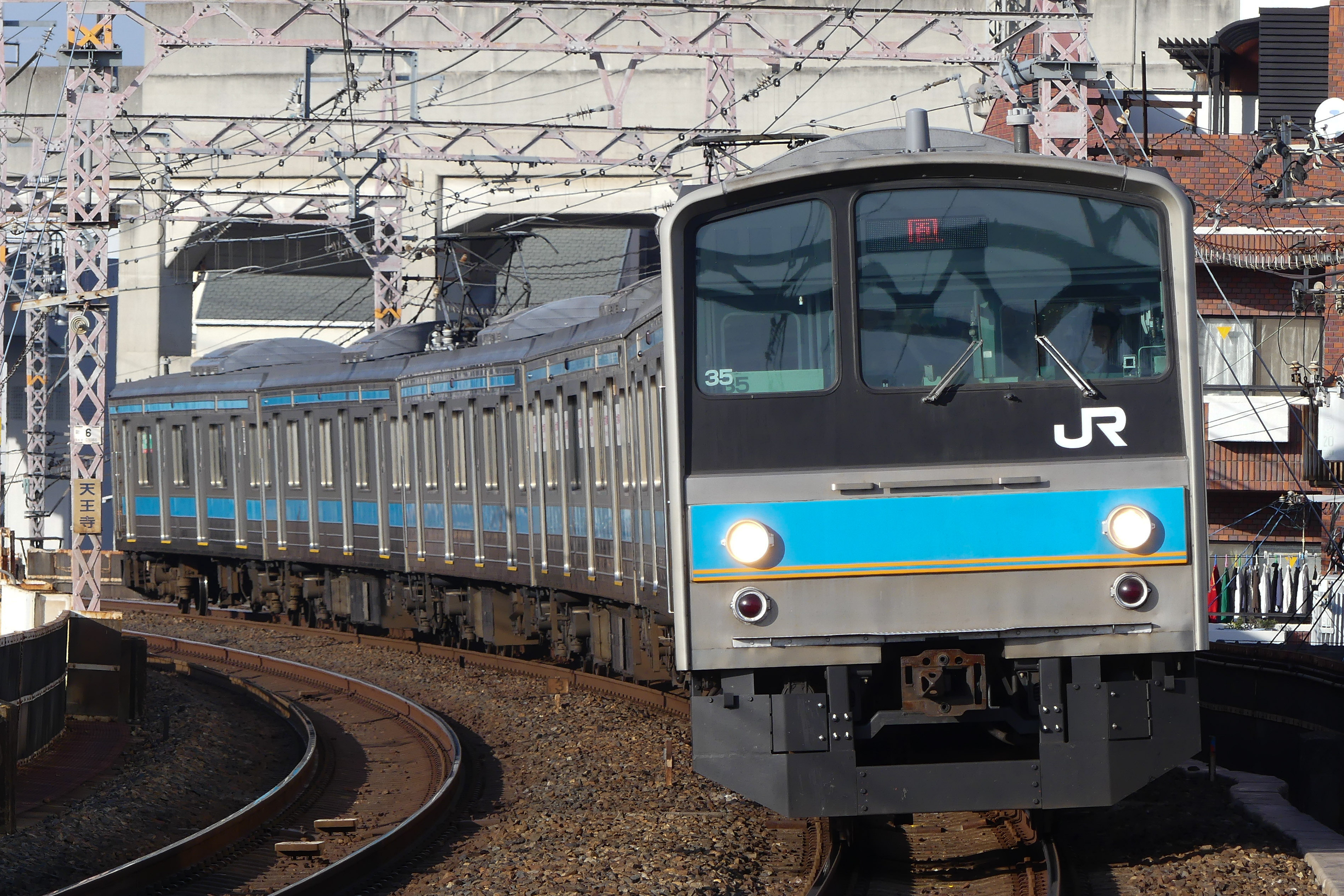
- JR West 205 series running on Hanwa Line between Tennoji & Bishoen
- Manufacturers: Hitachi, Kawasaki Heavy Industries, Kinki Sharyo, Nippon Sharyo, Tokyu Car Corporation, JR East Ōfuna Works
- Replaced: Japan; 101 series, 103 series, 107 series, KiHa 35; Indonesia; 103 series, Toei 6000 series, Tokyo Metro 5000 series, Toyo Rapid 1000 series, KRL Rheostatik, KRL BN-Holec, KRL INKA-Hitachi, KRL-I
- Constructed: 1984–1991; 1990–1994 (6-door cars)
- Entered service: 25 March 1985
- Refurbished: 2002–2013
- Scrapped: 2002–
- Number built: 1,461 vehicles
- Number in service: 59 vehicles (as of April 2026 in Japan); 788 vehicles (as of April 2026 in Indonesia)
- Number preserved: 1 vehicle
- Number scrapped: 350 vehicles (Japan)
- Successor: E131 series, 209 series, 225 series, 321 series, E231 series, E233 series
- Formation: 2, 3, 4, 6, 7, 8, 10, or 11 cars per trainset (Japan); 4, 6 (sometimes) 8, 10, or 12 cars per trainset (KAIC)
- Operators: JNR (1985–1987); JR East (1987–present); JR-West (1987–present); Fuji Kyuko (2011–present); KAI Commuter (2013–present)
- Depots: Miyagino, Nakahara, Keiyō, Kawagoe, Kōzu, Kamakura, Hineno, Miyahara; Bukit Duri, Depok, Bogor, Manggarai, Solo Jebres (KAIC)

Specifications
- Car body construction: Stainless steel
- Car length: 20,000 mm (65 ft 7 in)
- Doors: 4 pairs per side 6 pairs per side (SaHa 204)
- Maximum speed: Most: 100 km/h (62 mph); Hanwa Line 205-1000: 110 km/h (68 mph)
- Traction system: Resistor control + field system superimposed field excitation control; Variable frequency (IGBT) (205-5000 series)
- Traction motors: MT61 (resistor controlled)
- Acceleration: Most: 1.7 km/(h⋅s) (1.1 mph/s); 5000 subseries: 3.2 km/(h⋅s) (2.0 mph/s)
- Deceleration: 3.6 km/(h⋅s) (2.2 mph/s)
- Electric systems: 1,500 V DC overhead lines
- Current collection: Pantograph
- Braking systems: Regenerative brake, electronically controlled pneumatic brakes
- Safety systems: ATS-SN, (Note: Musashino Line, Sagami Line, Yamanote Line, and Yokohama Line) ATS-SW, (Note: Hanwa Line) ATS-P, ATS-Ps, (Note: Senseki Line) ATC, (Note: Keiyō Line, Yamanote Line, and Yokohama Line) D-ATC (Note: Yokohama Line)ATACS (Note: Senseki Line)
- Coupling system: Shibata type automatic coupler (using AAR Janney adaptor when coupled to AAR Janney-equipped vehicles in Indonesia)
- Track gauge: 1,067 mm (3 ft 6 in)

The 205 series (205系, 205-kei) is a DC electric multiple unit (EMU) commuter train type introduced in 1985 by Japanese National Railways (JNR), and inherited by JR East and JR West after JNR was privatised two years later. It is currently operated by East Japan Railway Company (JR East), West Japan Railway Company (JR West), Fuji Kyuko (Fujikyu) in Japan and KAI Commuter in Indonesia. Some of them were re-designated as Fujikyuko Series 6000.

== Operations ==
JR East (in alphabetical order)

- Nambu Branch Line: 2-car 205–1000 series sets (x1) (from 2002) (rebuilt by JR East from former 205–0 series sets)

JR West

- Nara Line: 4-car JR West 205-0 and 205–1000 series sets (transferred from Hanwa Line services)

Fuji Kyuko

- Fujikyuko Line: 3-car Fujikyu 6000 series sets converted from 205 series cars.

KAI Commuter (in alphabetical order)

- Duri-Tangerang Line:8/10-car 205 series sets since 2018.
- Jakarta Kota-Bogor Line: 8-car, 10-car (since 2014) and 12-car (since 2015) 205 series sets.
- Cikarang Loop Line: 8-car (since 2014), 10-car (since 2015), and 12-car (since 2015) 205 series sets.
- Rangkasbitung Line: 10-car (since 2016) 205 series sets
- Tanjung Priok Line: 8-car (since 2014) 205 series sets.
- Yogyakarta Line: 4/8-car (from 2021 to 2022) and 8-car (2025) 205 series sets

== Former operations ==
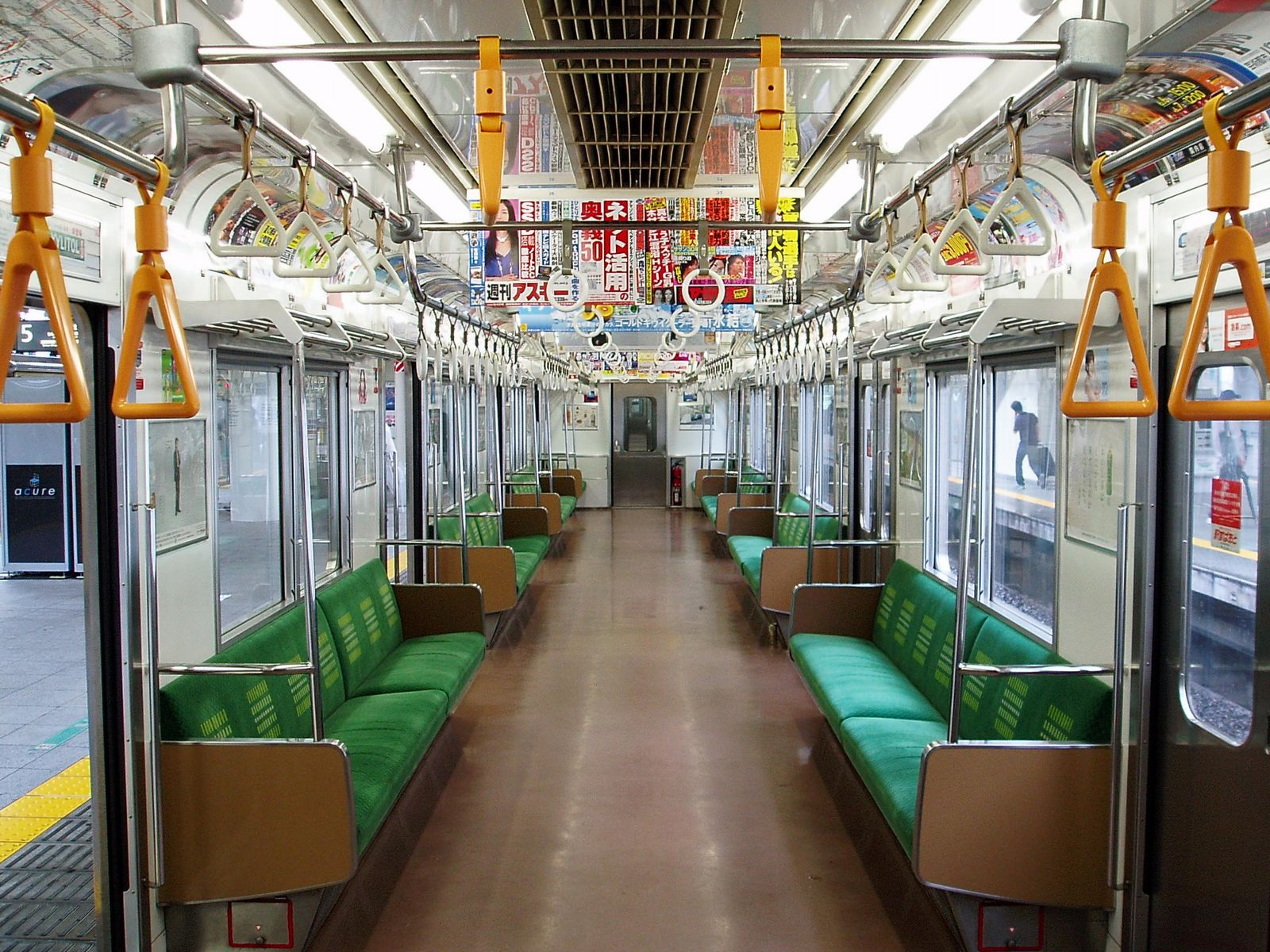
Interior of a Keiyo Line 205–0 series 4-door car in June 2008

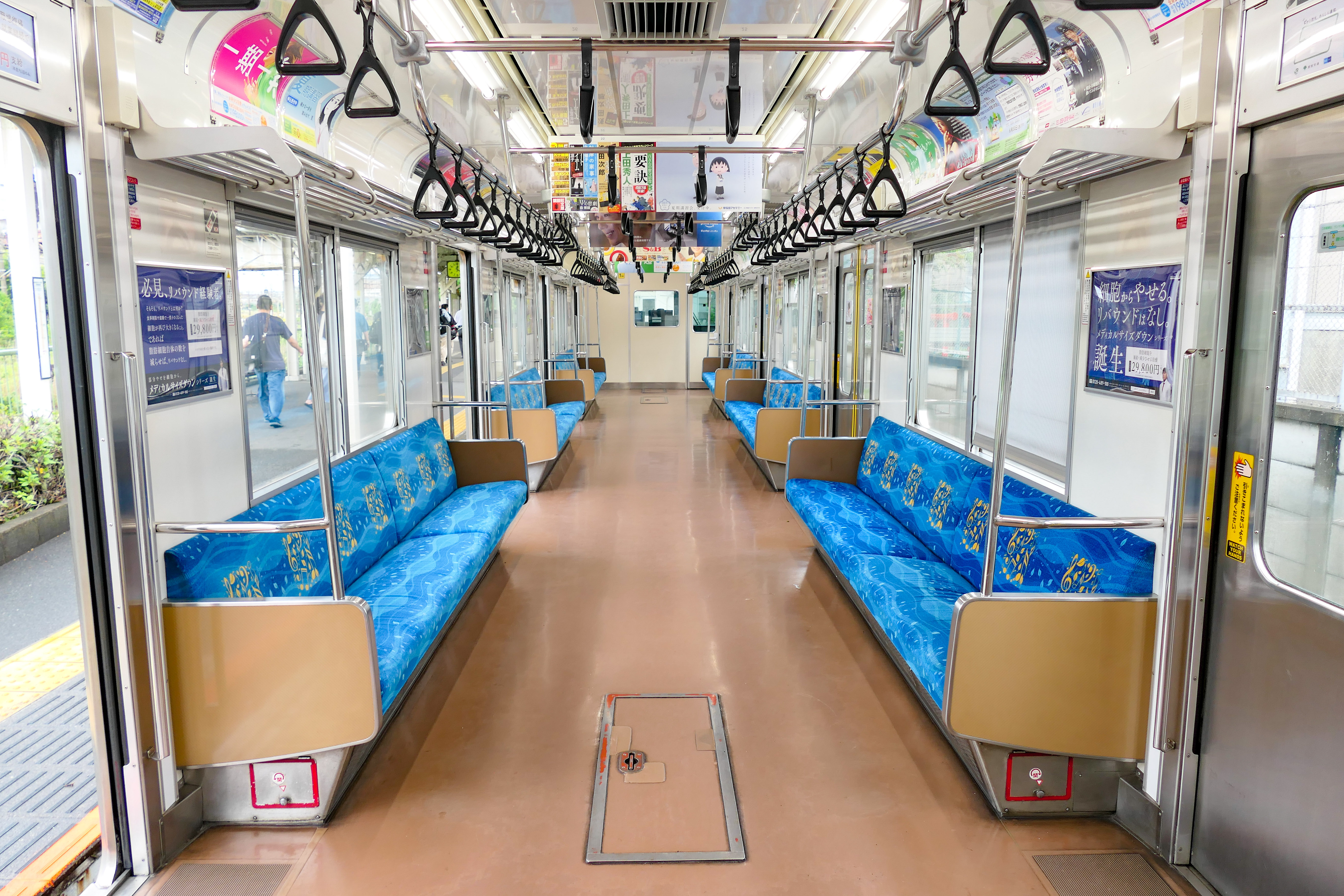
Interior of 205–1000 series in June 2018

- Chuo-Sobu Line: 10-car 205–0 series sets (from 1989 until 2001)
- Hachikō Line: 4-car 205–3000 series sets (x5) (from 2003 until 15 July 2018) (former 205-0 sets modified by JR-East to form shorter trainsets for use in outer suburban services) (have passenger-operated door controls)
- Hanwa Line: 4-car 205-1000 (built by JR-West) series sets (from 1988), 6- and 8-car 205–0 series sets (from 2006 until 2010; March 2013 until 16 March 2018) (formerly operated on JR-West Tokaido-Sanyo Local services as 7-car sets)
- Kawagoe Line: 4-car 205–3000 series sets (x5) (from 2003 until 15 July 2018) (rebuilt by JR East from former 205–0 series sets, with passenger-operated door controls) / 10-car 205–0 series sets (from July 1989 until October 2016)
- Keihin-Tohoku Line: 10-car 205–0 series sets (from 1989 until 1996)
- Keiyō Line: 10-car 205–0 series sets (from 1990 until 2011)
- Loop Line: 8, 10, and 12-car (until 27 May 2022) 205 series sets
- Musashino Line: 8-car 205–5000 series sets (x36) and 8-car 205–0 series sets (x6) (from 1991 until October 2019 (205-0 series sets) and from 2002 until October 2020 (205-5000 series sets))
- Nambu Line: 6-car 205-0 (x31) (including 4 sets with 205-1200 driving trailers which were converted from 205–0 series intermediate trailers) (from 1989 until 9 January 2016)
- Nikkō Line: Refurbished 4-car 205–600 series sets with toilets (x4) (from March 2013 until 11 March 2022)
- Sagami Line: 4-car 205–500 series sets (x13) (from 1991 until February 2022)
- Saikyo Line: 10-car 205–0 series set (from July 1989 until October 2016) (through service to Rinkai Line)
- Senseki Line: 4-car 205–3100 series sets (from 2004 until 13 March 2026) (rebuilt by JR East from former 205–0 series sets with passenger-operated door controls, toilets, and passenger seating which can be arranged in either transverse or longitudinal)
- Tokaido-Sanyō Local service (Biwako, Kyoto, Kobe, Fukuchiyama lines): 7-car 205–0 series sets (from 1986 until 2006)
- Tokaido Local Service (Kyoto, Kobe lines): 7-car 205–0 series sets (from 2011 until March 2013) (formerly operated on JR-West Hanwa Line as 6- and 8-car sets)
- Tsurumi Line: 3-car 205–1100 series sets (x9) (from 25 August 2004 until February 2024) (rebuilt from former 205-0 sets)
- Utsunomiya Line: Refurbished 4-car sets with toilets (x8) (from March 2013 until 11 March 2022)
- Yamanote Line: 11-car 205–0 series sets (from 1985 until 2005) (initially 10-car sets)
- Yokohama Line: 8-car 205–0 series sets (x28) (from 1988 until 23 August 2014, initially 7-car sets)

== Design variants ==
There have been many variations of the design of the 205 series trains.

- 205-0 series: 6, 7, and 8-car sets used on the JR West Tokaido Line, and Hanwa Line. 6, 7, 8, 10, and 11-car sets used on the JR East Chuo-Sobu Line, Keihin-Tohoku Line, Keiyo Line, Nambu Line, Musashino Line, Saikyo Line, Yamanote Line, and Yokohama Line.
- 205-500 series: 4-car sets used on the Sagami Line
- 205-600 series: 4-car sets for use on the Nikko Line and Utsunomiya Line from 16 March 2013
- 205-1000 series: 4-car JR-West sets that formerly ran on Hanwa Line. Currently runs on Nara Line.
- 205-1000 series: 2-car JR East sets rebuilt from former 205–0 series cars, used on the Nambu Branch Line
- 205-1100 series: 3-car sets rebuilt from former 205–0 series cars, introduced on the Tsurumi Line from 25 August 2004
- 205-1200 series: 6-car sets rebuilt from former 205–0 series cars, used on the Nambu Line
- 205-3000 series: 4-car sets rebuilt from former 205–0 series cars, used on the Kawagoe Line and Hachiko Line
- 205-3100 series: 4-car sets rebuilt from former 205–0 series cars, used on the Senseki Line
- 205-5000 series: Former Yamanote Line 205–0 series cars modified with new IGBT-VVVF-controlled AC motors between 2002 and 2008, used on the Musashino Line

== 205-0 series ==
205-0 series
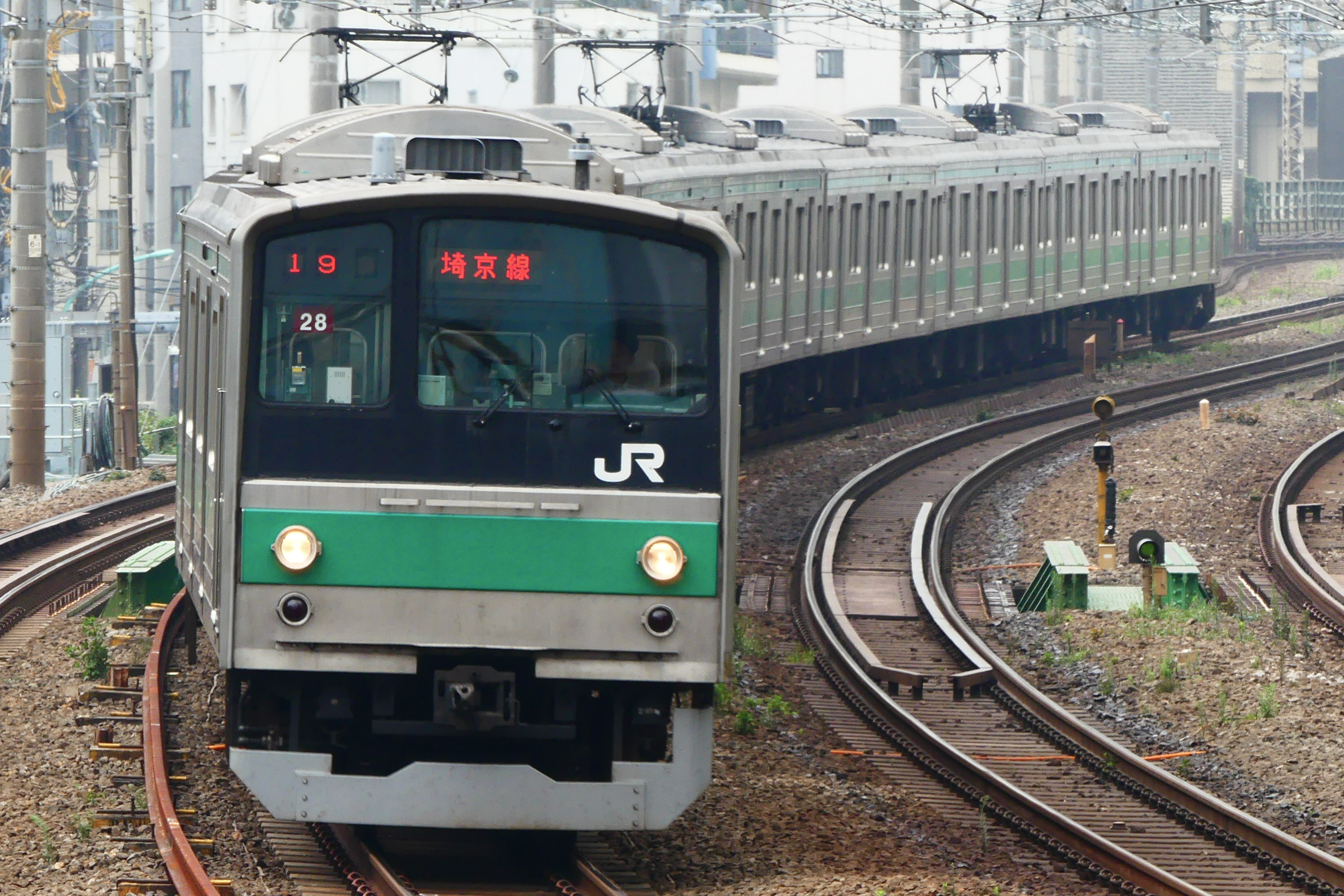
- JR East 205-0 series running on Saikyo Line, 2016
- In service: 1985–present (Japan, only JR West Nara Line still in operation, all JR East lines stopped in 2020); 2013–present (Indonesia, KAI Commuter)
- Replaced: 103 series Toei 6000 series, KRL-I, KRL Rheostatik, KRL INKA-Hitachi, KRL BN-Holec, KRL ABB-Hyundai (Indonesia)
- Constructed: 1985–1991
- Entered service: March 1985
- Refurbished: 1991–2002 (only minor refurbishments)
- Scrapped: 2002–
- Number built: 1,389 vehicles
- Number in service: 24 vehicles (Japan); 492 vehicles (as of February 2020 in Indonesia)
- Number preserved: 1 vehicle
- Number scrapped: 350 vehicles (Japan)
- Formation: 4/6/7/8/10/11 cars per trainset (Japan), 8/10/12 cars per trainset (Indonesia)
- Fleet numbers: Various
- Capacity: 48 seats (bench seats) & 88 standing seats (leading car); 54 seats, 90 standing seats (intermediate car)
- Operators: JNR (1985–1987); JR East (1987–2020); JR West (1987–present); KAI Commuter (2013–present)
- Depots: Nakahara, Kōzu, Kamakura; Bukit Duri, Depok, Bogor (KCI)
- Lines served: Former: JR East: Yamanote Line, Keihin-Tohoku Line, Chuo-Sobu Line, Saikyo Line, Yokohama Line, Musashino Line, Keiyo Line, Nambu Line, Tokaido Line, Sanyo Main Line, Hanwa Line, JR West: Sanyo Main Line, Hanwa Line, KAI Commuter: Loop Line Current: JR West: Nara Line, KAI Commuter: Duri-Tangerang Line; Jakarta Kota-Bogor Line; Rangkasbitung Line; Cikarang Loop Line; Tanjung Priok Line; Yogyakarta–Solo line

Specifications
- Car body construction: Stainless steel
- Car length: 20,000 mm (65 ft 7 in)
- Width: 2,800 mm (9 ft 2 in)
- Doors: 4 pairs per side
- Maximum speed: 110 km/h (68 mph)(Hanwa Line 205-1000 series & Keiyo Line); 100 km/h (62 mph)(other)
- Weight: 34.4 t (MoHa 204); 23.6 t (SaHa 204)
- Acceleration: 1.7 km/(h⋅s) (1.1 mph/s)
- Deceleration: 3.6 km/(h⋅s) (2.2 mph/s)
- Electric system: 1,500 V DC overhead lines
- Current collection: Pantograph
- Bogies: DT50 (motored), TR235D (trailer)
- Safety systems: ATS-P, ATS-SN
- Coupling system: Shibata-Type
- Track gauge: 1,067 mm (3 ft 6 in)

The 205 series was designed in 1982 as a cheap-to-produce train that could complement the 201 series sets which were considered to be expensive to produce due to the latter's thyristor chopper-controlled traction systems. The first set entered service on the Yamanote Line on 1985. It was originally built with resistor-controlled traction systems, which were cheaper to produce than the typical thyristor chopper-controlled, but this was somewhat dated technology due to the advent of variable-frequency drives which had just started being used around this time. It uses a traditional design with an unpainted stainless steel body very much like most trains of the period. Each set has a different colour scheme to indicate which area the sets serve.

The 205 series was used on both JR East and JR West lines, and the 205–0 series will be finally ending operation in JR East on 2020. Following their retirement, 524 205–0 series vehicles were shipped to Jakarta, Indonesia from 2013 to 2020 to continue their operation overseas replacing aging commuter trains and mass improvement of public transportation in Greater Jakarta by train, while there are still 205–0 series operational on JR West lines.

The 205 series was manufactured from 1984 to 1991 and initially built as 10-car trainsets with a test-run conducted in 1984 for the JNR Yamanote Line. It was manufactured by Tokyu Car Corporation, Hitachi for technical components, Nippon Sharyo, Kinki Sharyo, and Kawasaki Heavy Industries. The basic structure is similar to that of the subsequently manufactured vehicles such as the 201 series and the 203 series, with the difference that the window shape is a two-pane window panels with the upper stage descending and the lower stage rising. 205 series trainsets from all four manufacturers were introduced to the Yamanote line in March 1985. In 1991, the Saha 204-0 was introduced as a 6-door intermediate carriage for the Yamanote Line and assigned as the new car No. 10 which was then coupled to form 11-car Yamanote Line trainsets from December 1991.

In 2005, the Saha 204 intermediate carriages, were transferred to the Saikyo Line upon retirement from Yamanote Line. Some of the existing Yamanote Line 205 series were transferred to the Keiyo line to continue operation until 2011. The trip number indicator of each leading car was initially introduced as a traditional roller-binding display as commonly used by other JNR rolling stocks, but in 1985 a LCD type trip number indicator display was installed for the first time to be later installed on the 0-subseries mass-produced vehicles.

- JR East 205–0 series gallery
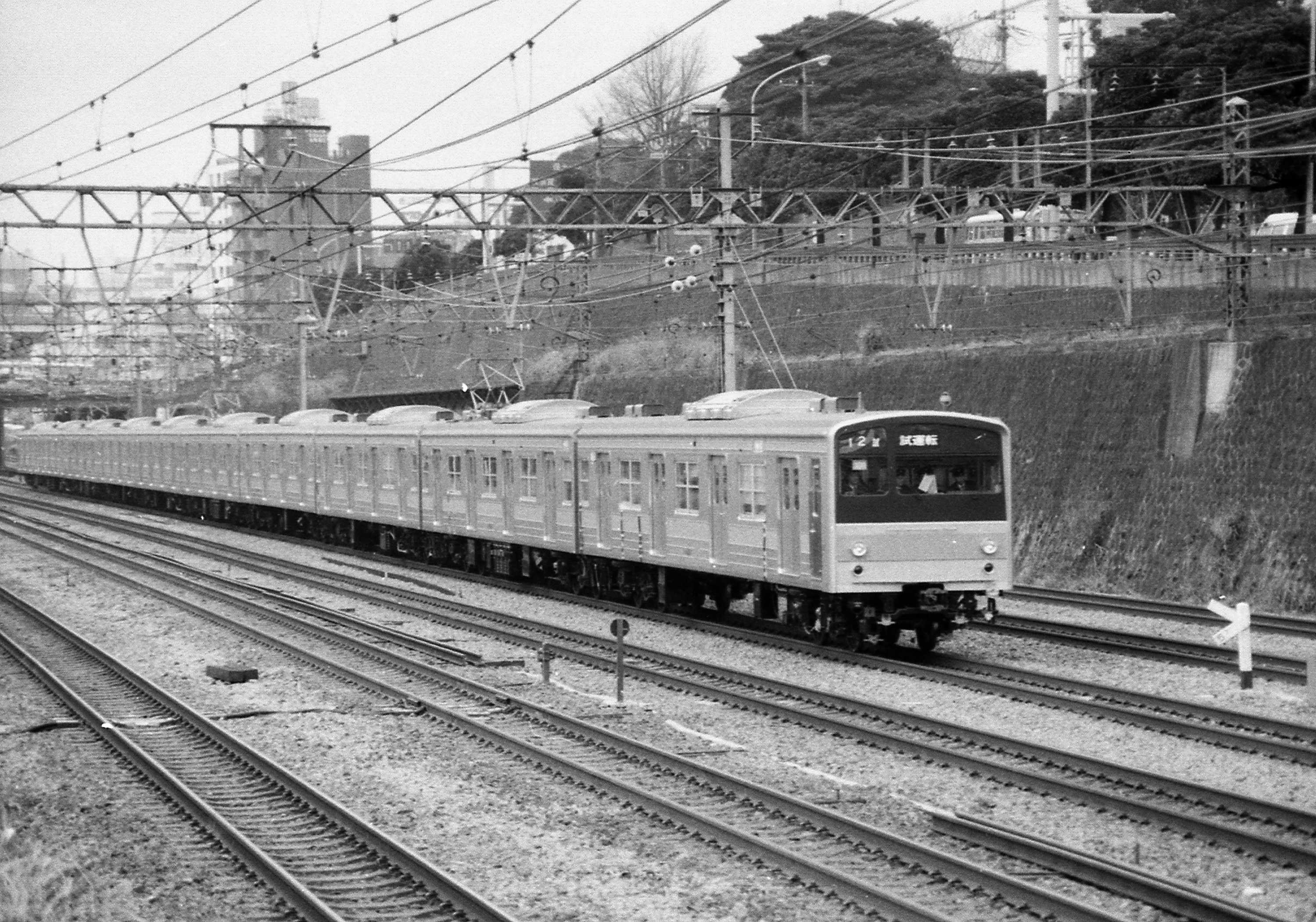
Yamanote Line 205-0 series set on a trial run on the Tokaido Main Line, March 1985

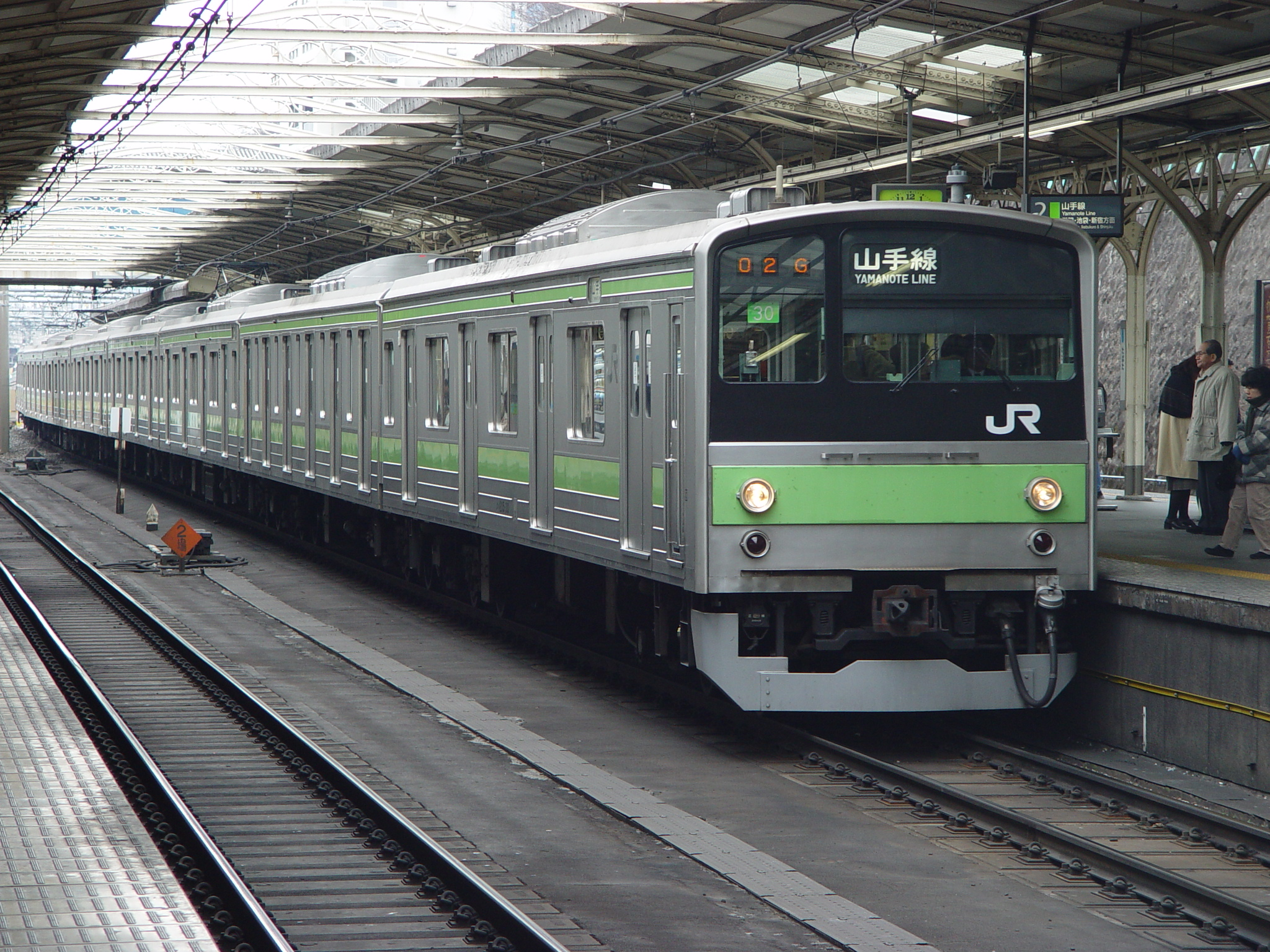
Yamanote Line 205–0 series set 30 in February 2003

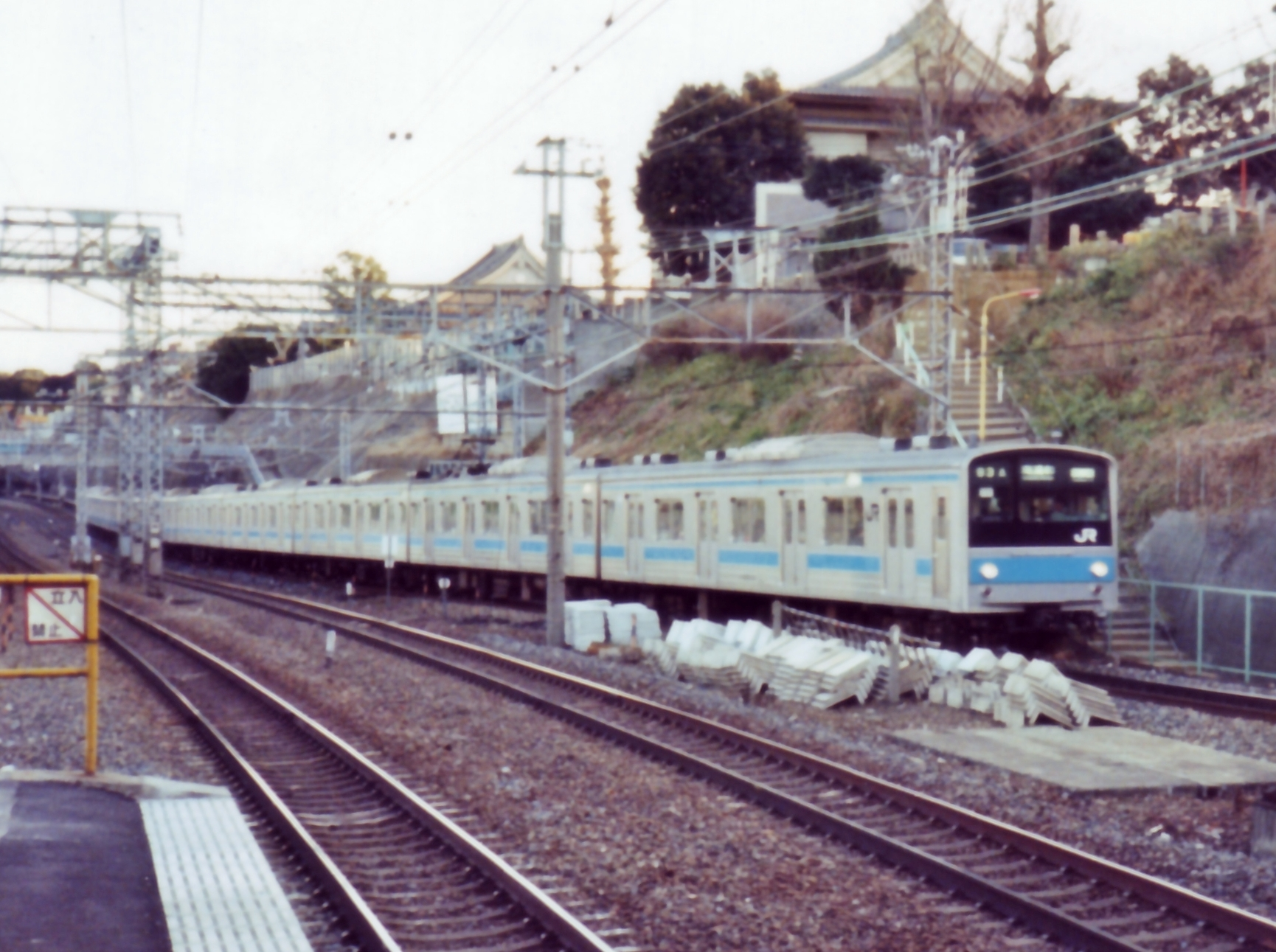
A Keihin-Tohoku Line 205–0 series in February 1992

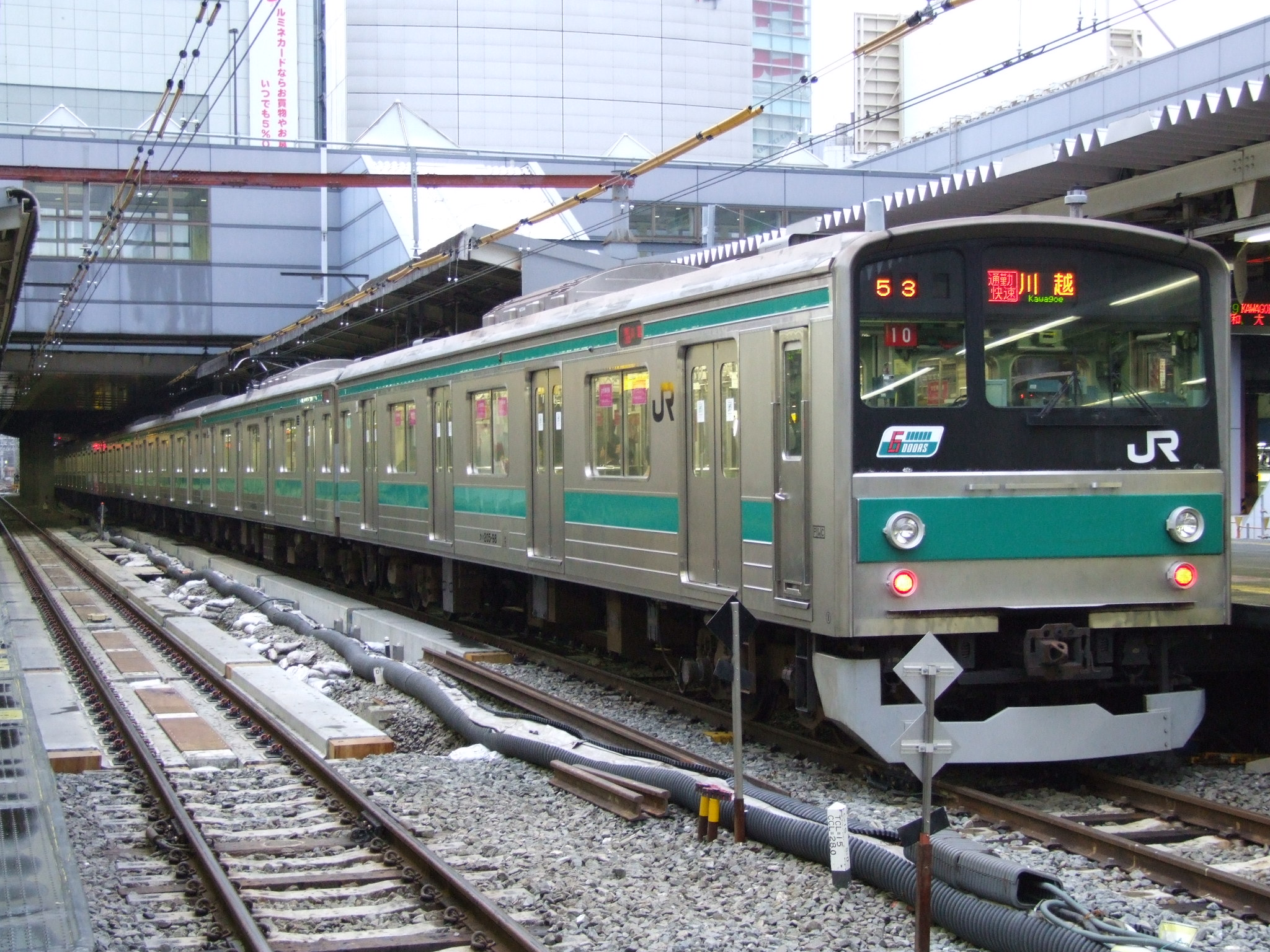
A Saikyo Line 205–0 series in November 2007

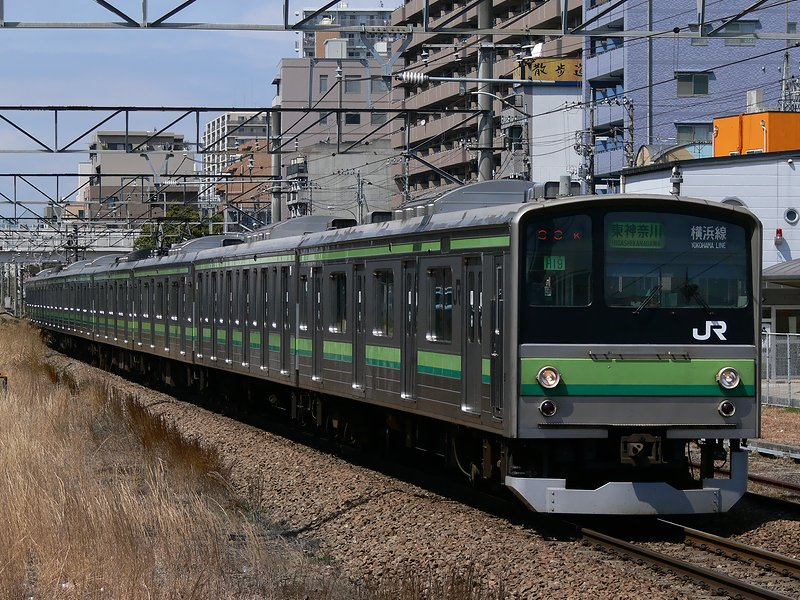
A Yokohama Line 205–0 series in April 2008

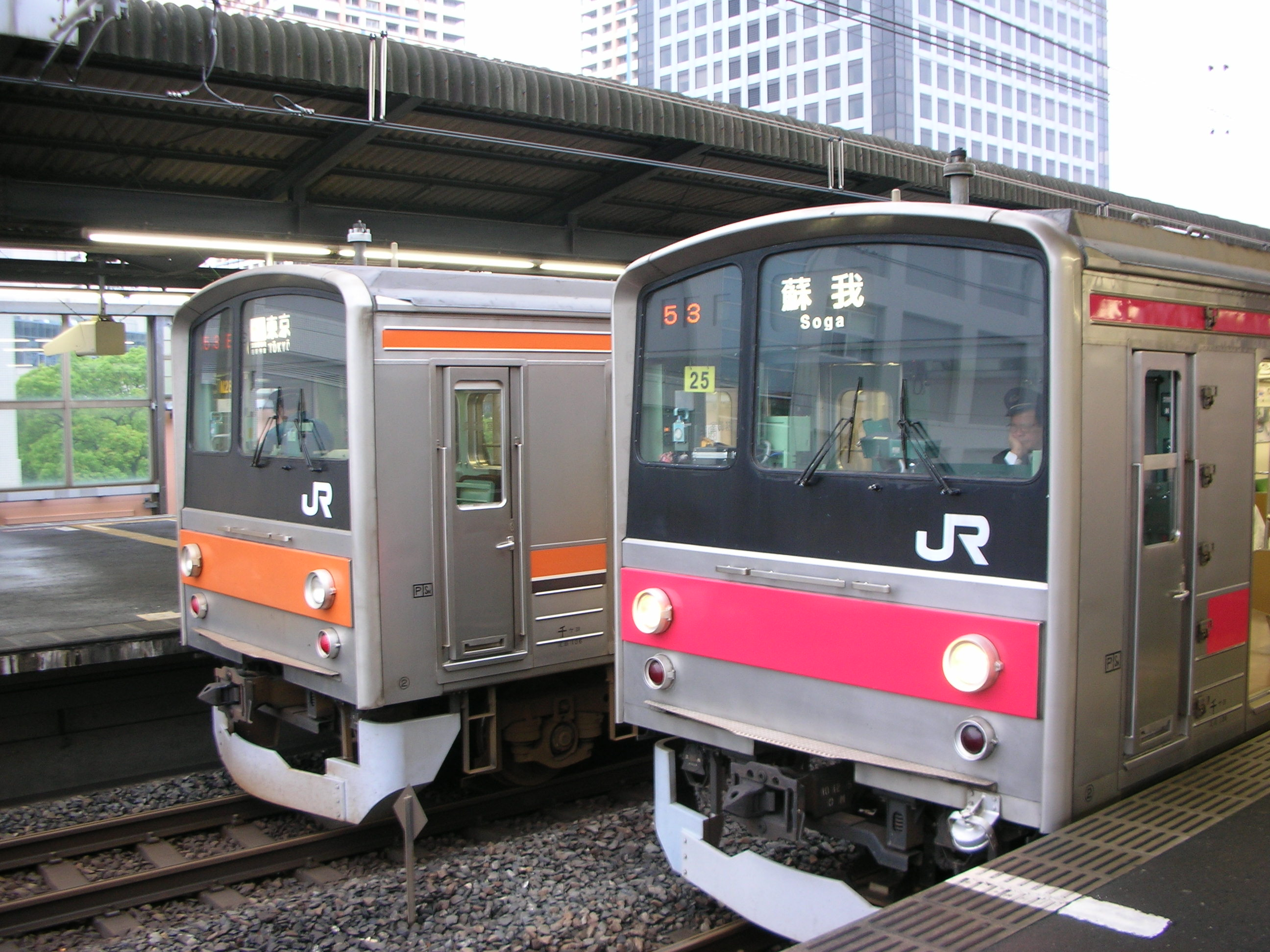
Musashino Line (left) and Keiyo Line (right) 205–0 series trains in May 2006

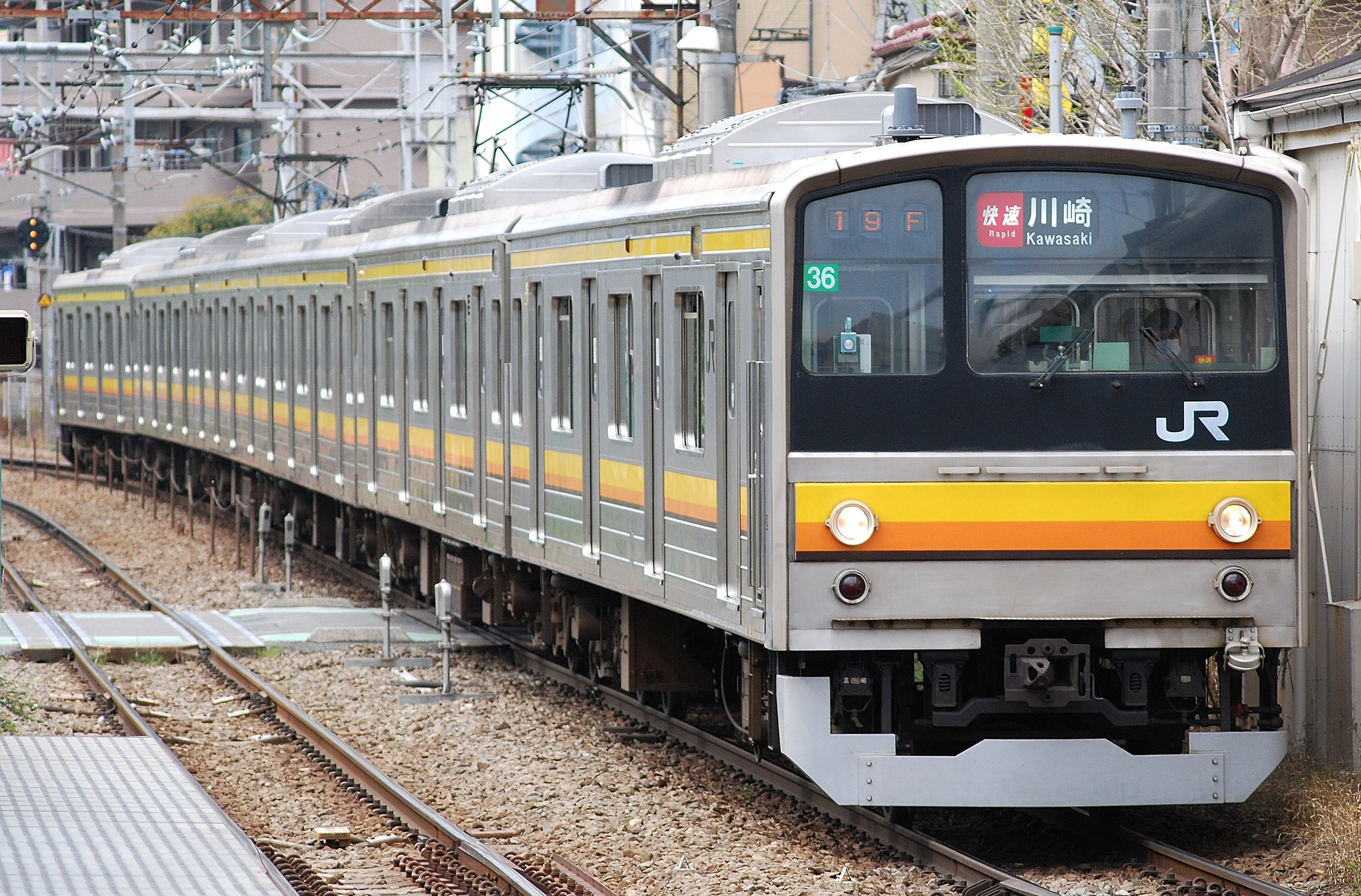
A Nambu Line 205–0 series in April 2011

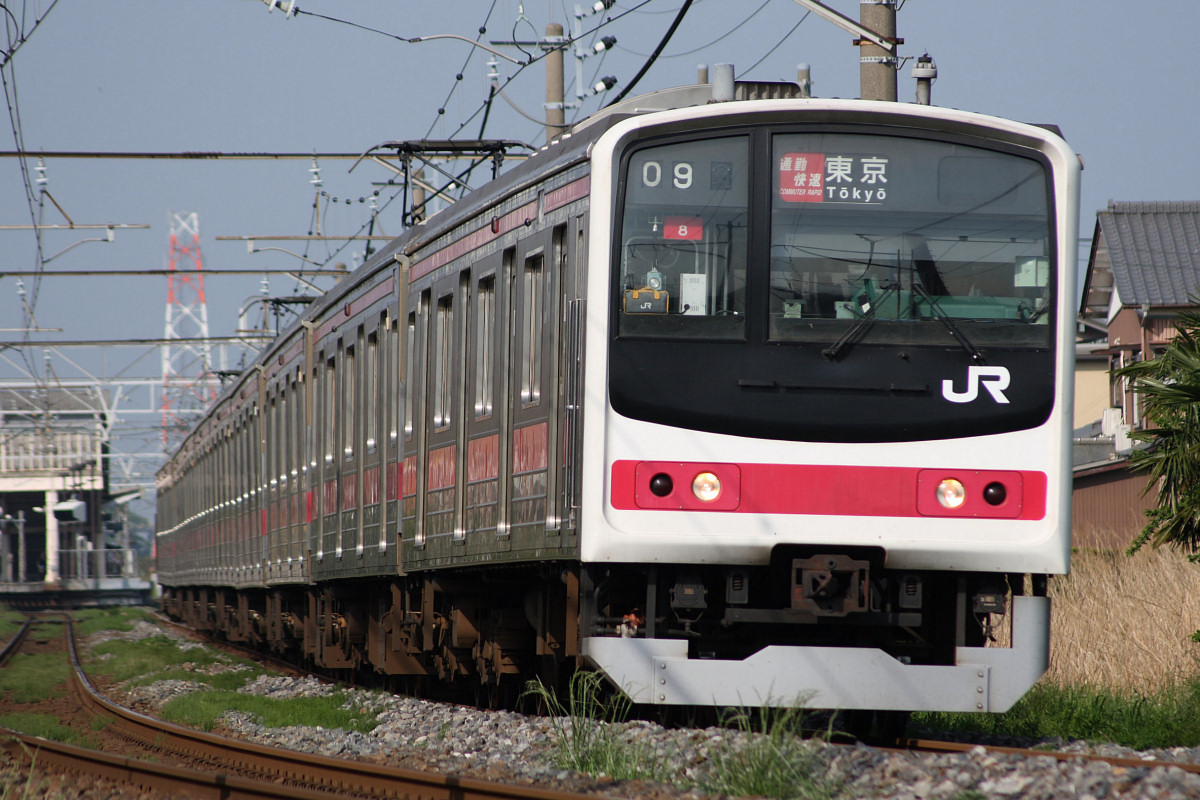
A Keiyo Line 205–0 series (later design) in May 2008
- JR West 205–0 series gallery
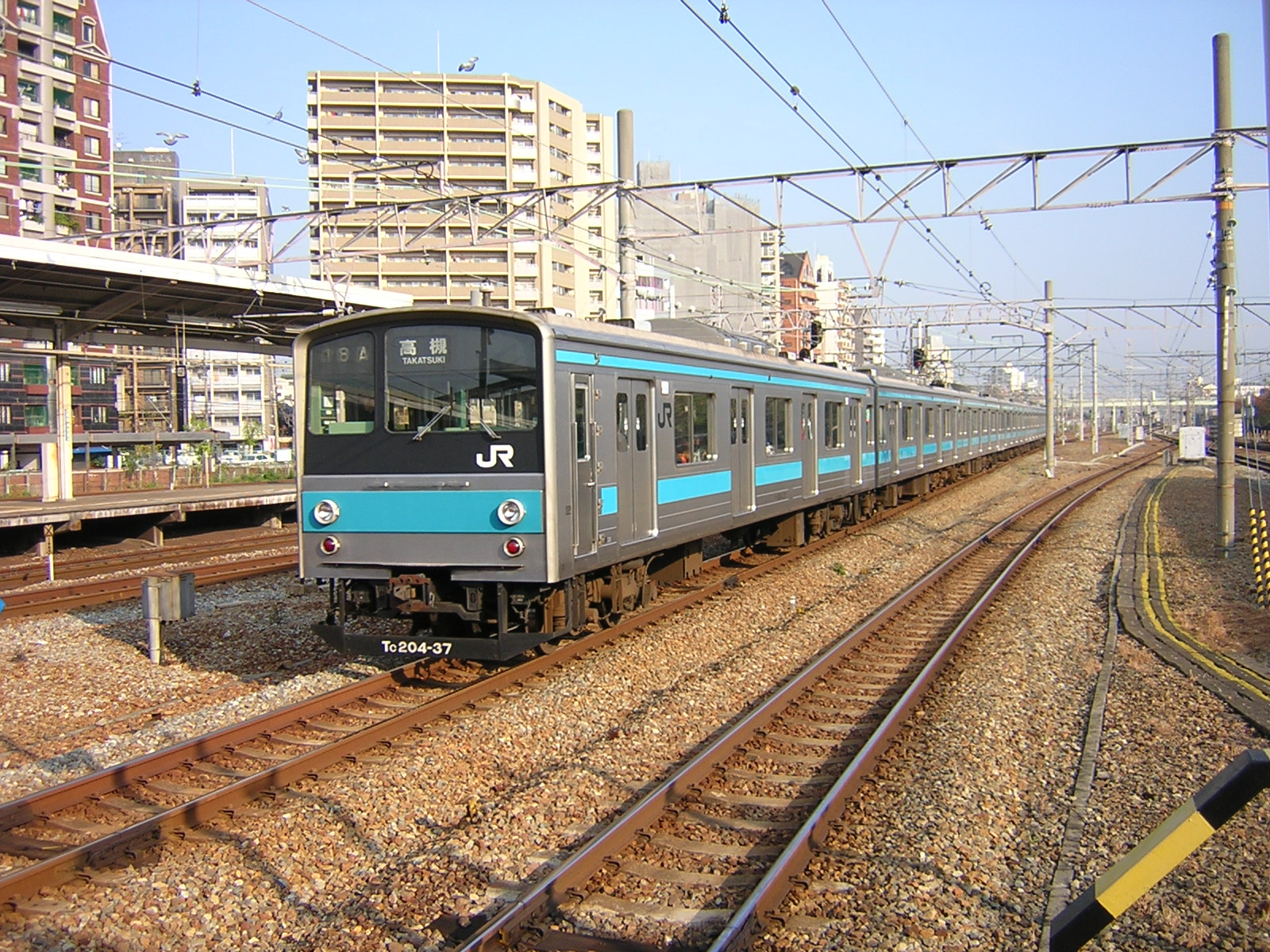
A JR-West 205–0 series in original livery in November 2003

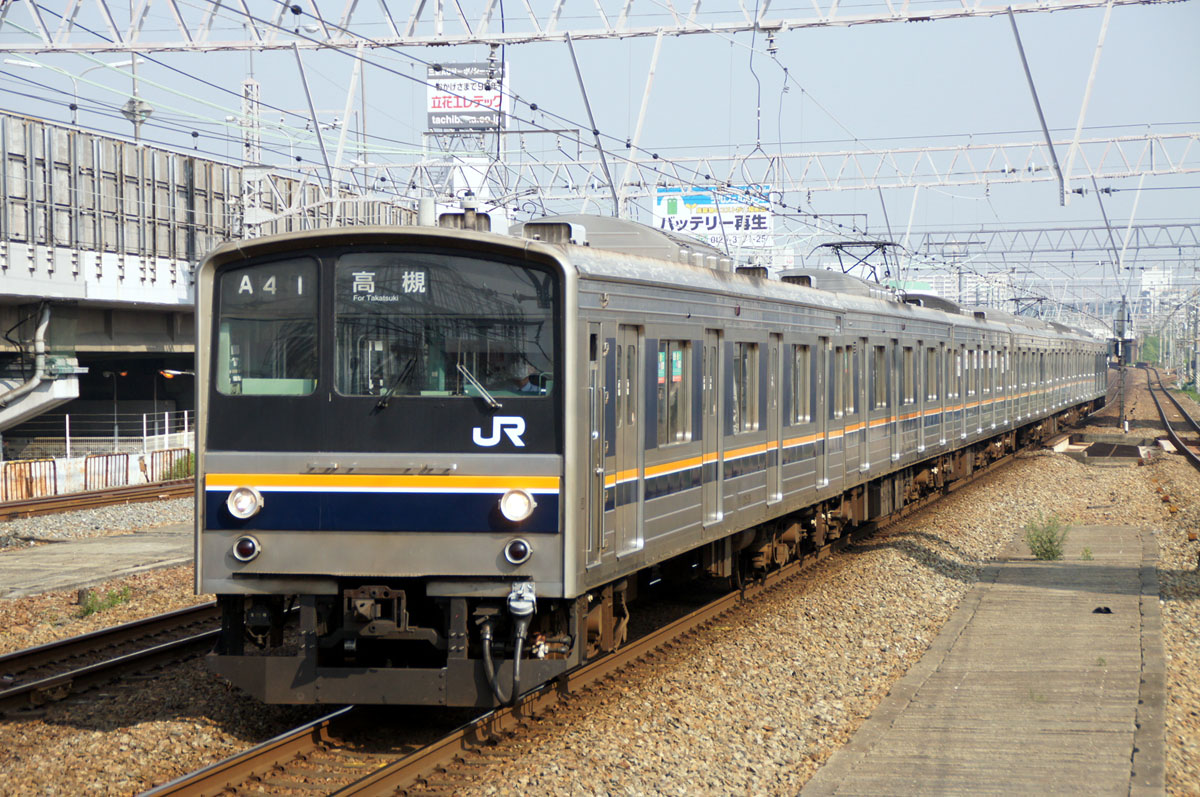
A JR-West 205–0 series in Tokaido Main Line livery in May 2011

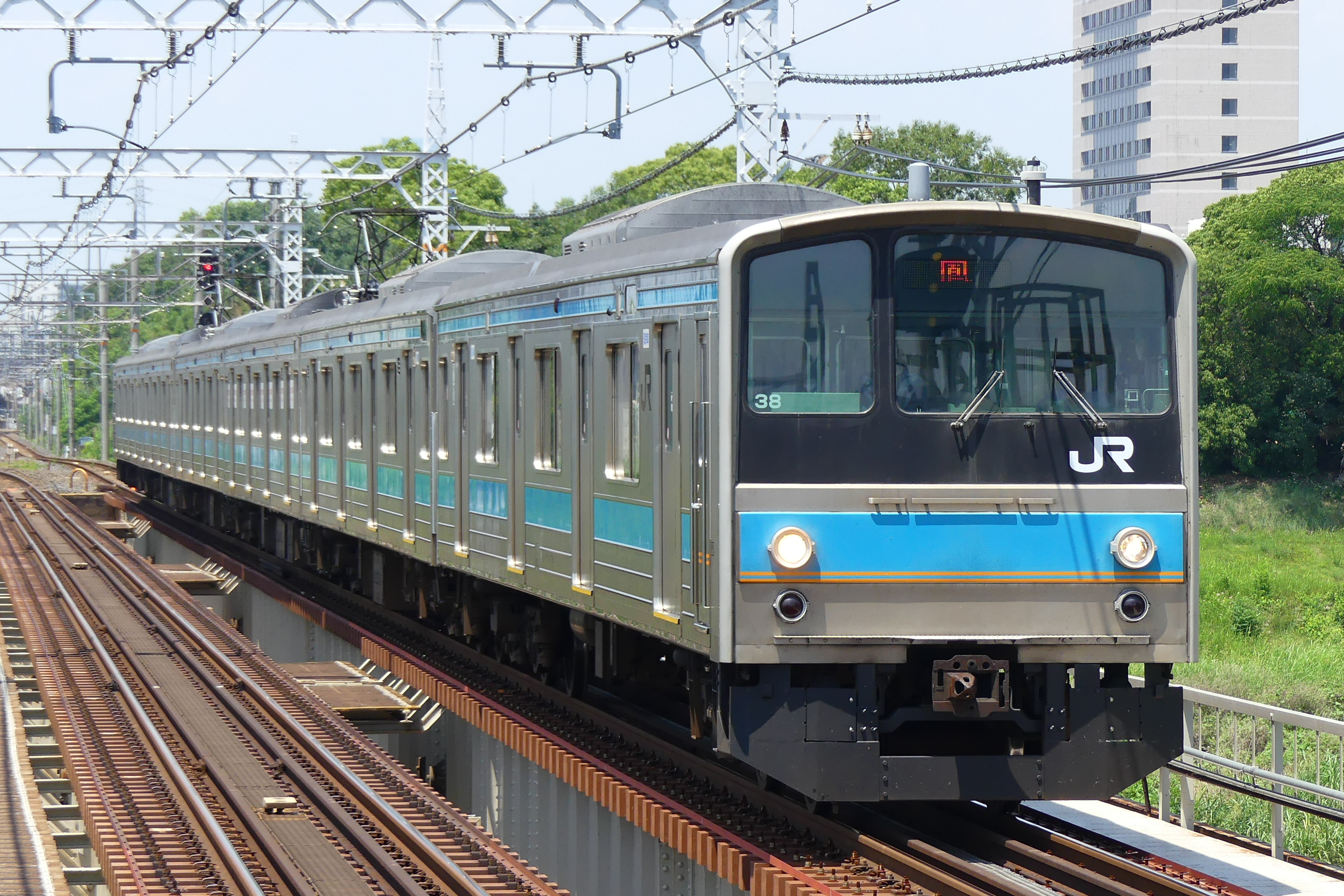
A JR-West 205–0 series in new Hanwa Line livery in July 2017
- KAI Commuter 205-0 series gallery
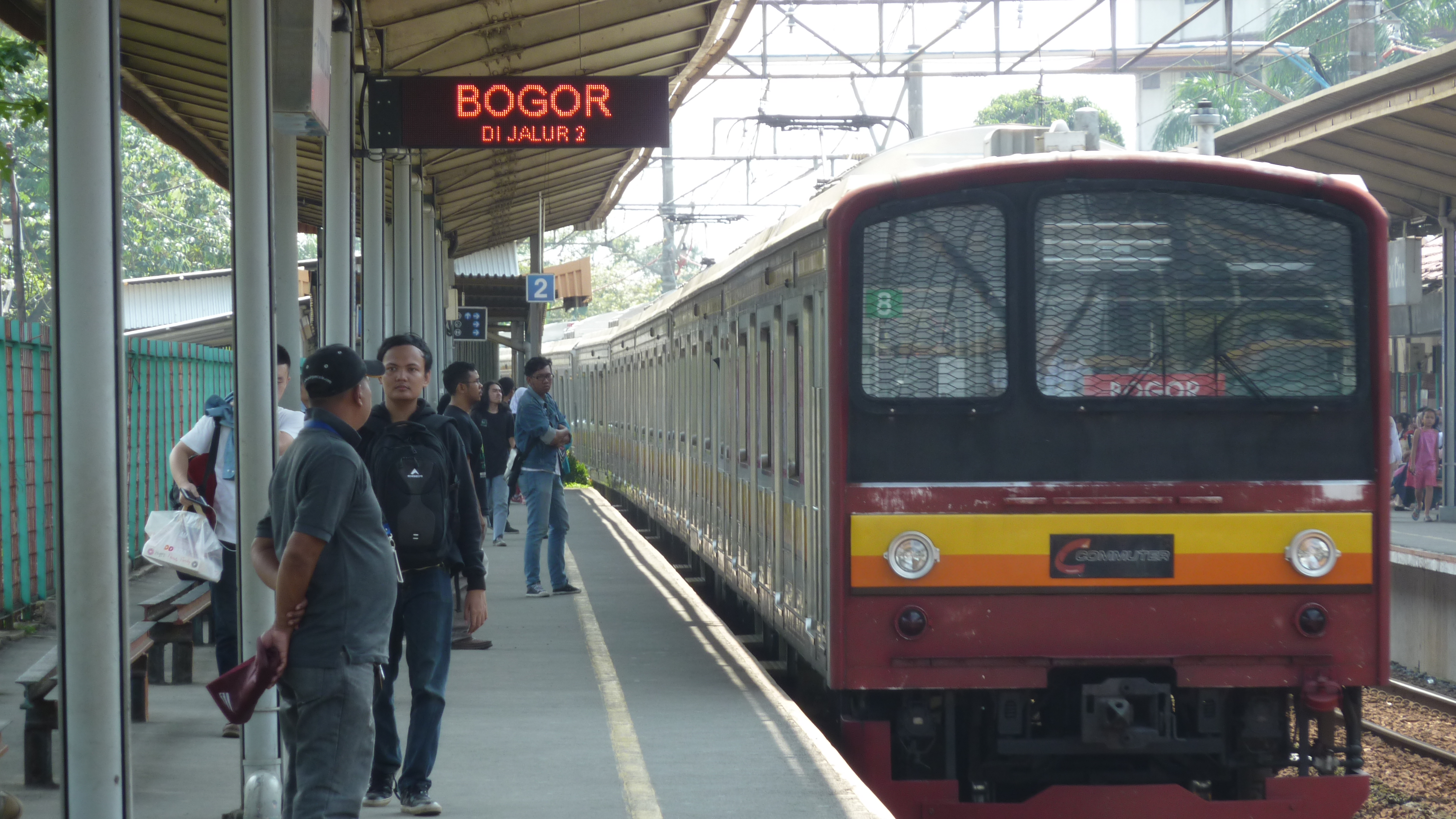
Ex-Nambu Line 205-0 series (NaHa 8) arriving Pondok Cina Station, May 18, 2016

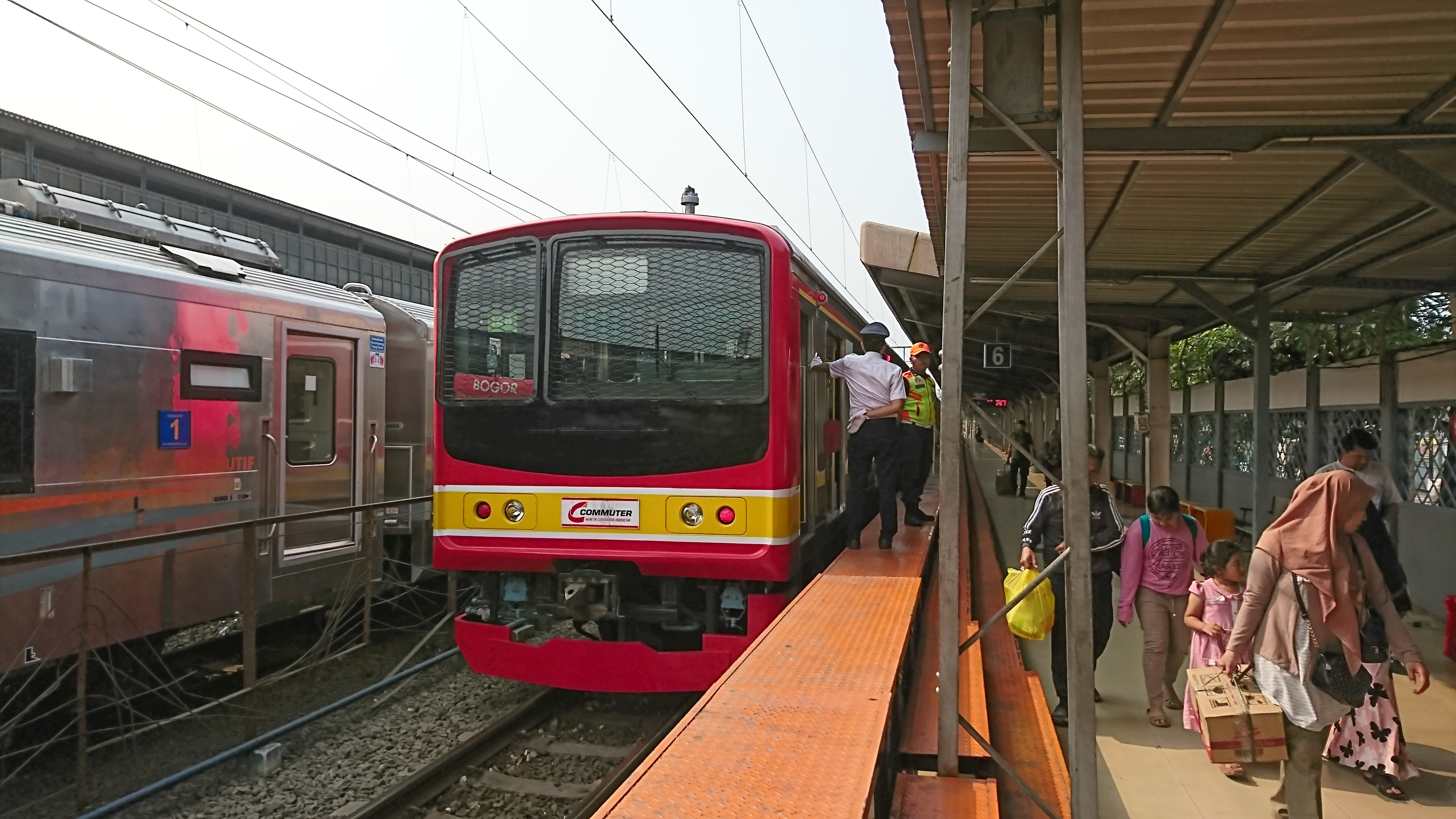
Ex-Musashino Line 205-0 series set M64 (147+148) on Pasar Senen Station

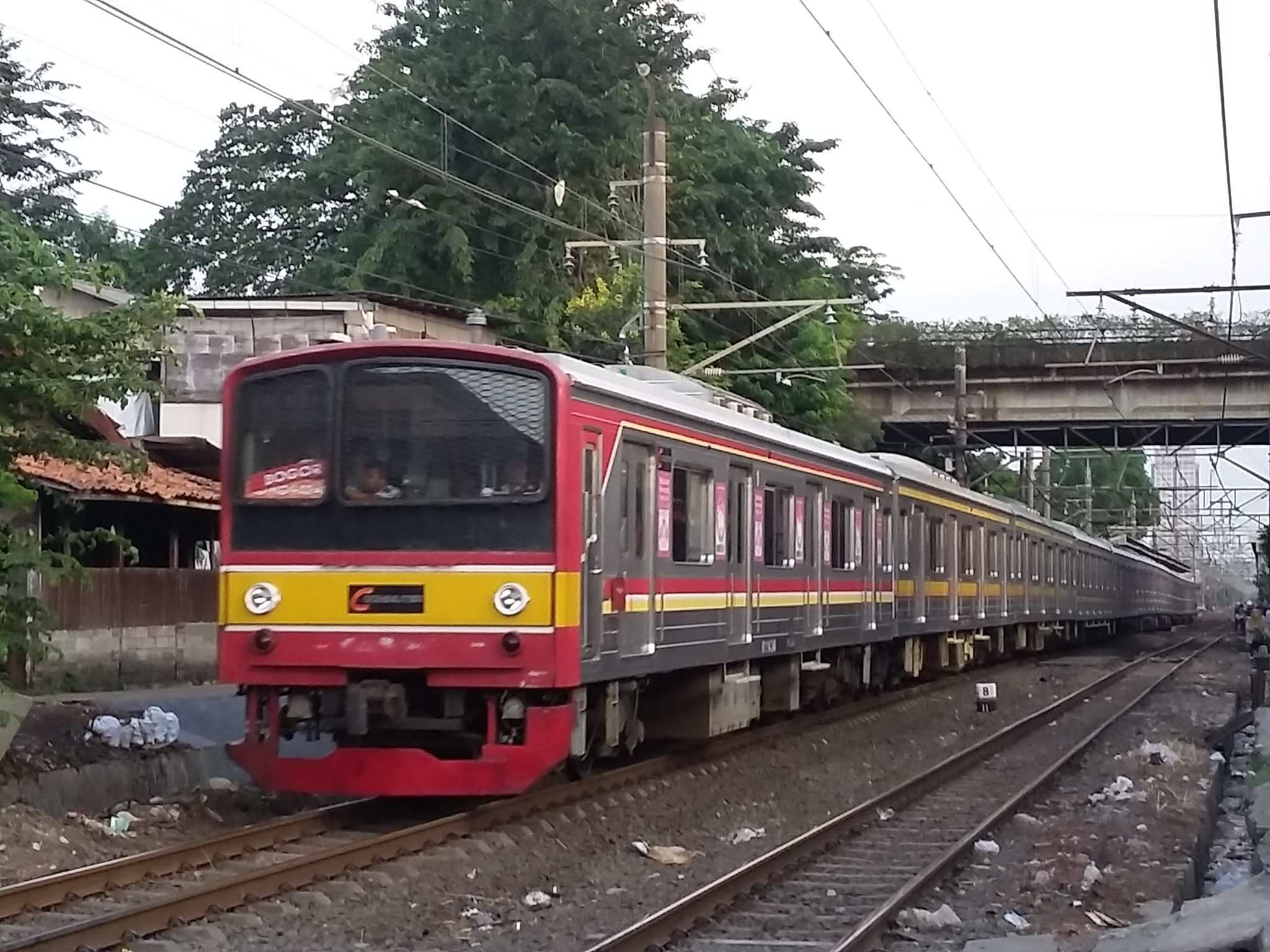
Ex-Nambu Line 205-0 series in Tebet, South Jakarta, April 28, 2016. Notice two additional cars from 205-131F and still wearing Nambu Line livery.

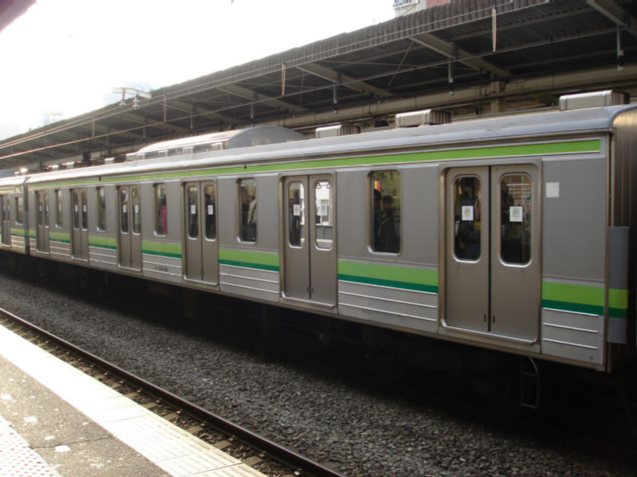
A 205-0 series 6-door car in December 2004

== 205-500 series ==
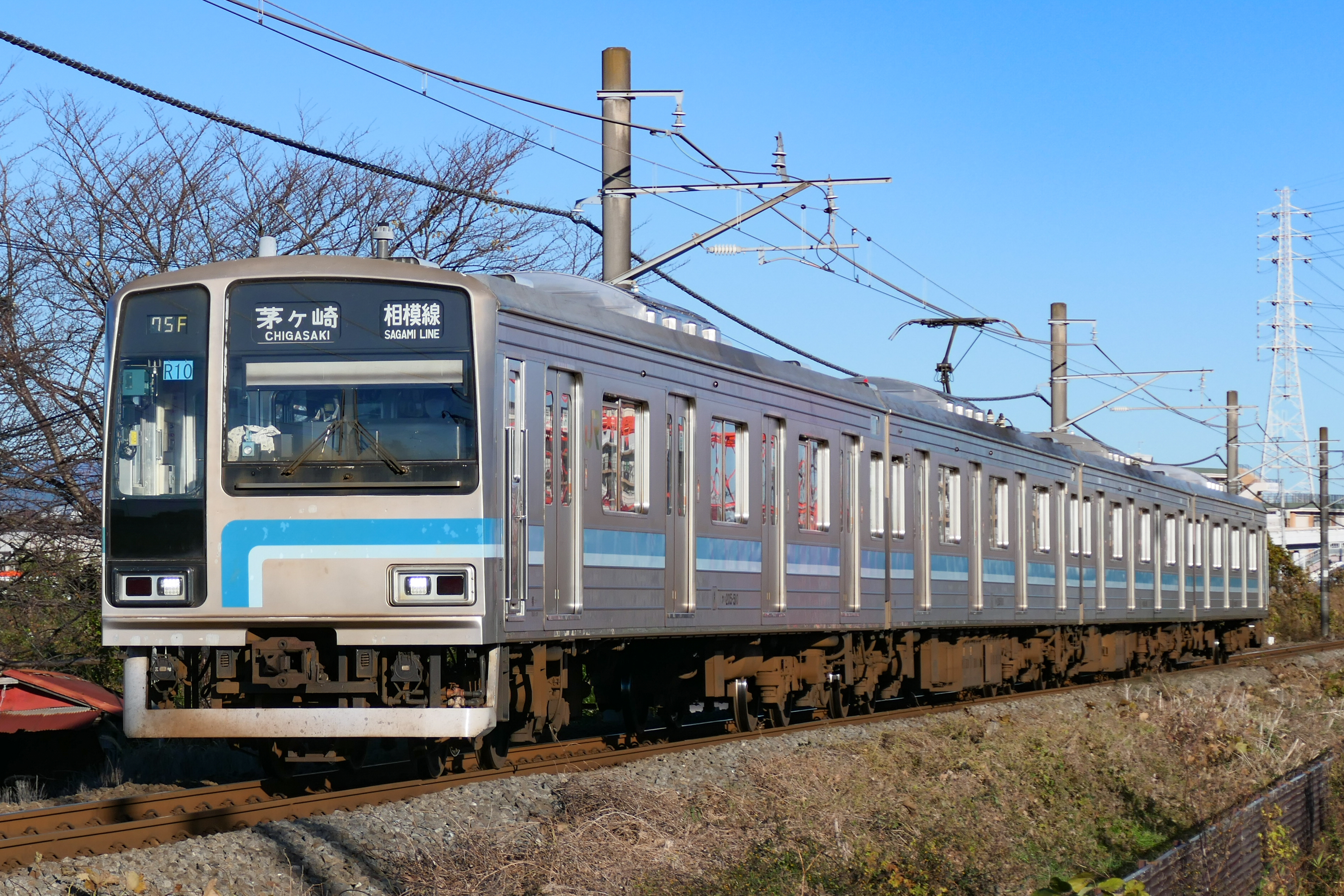
A Sagami Line 205-500 series trainset in November 2021

The 205-500 series 4-car sets were introduced into service by JR East on the Sagami Line in 1991, when the line was fully electrified. These sets featured a number of design changes over the original 205 series, such as passenger-operable doors as well as a revamped front-end design. Following the introduction of the newer E131-500 series trains, all sets were withdrawn from service by February 2022.

== 205-600 series ==
205-600 series
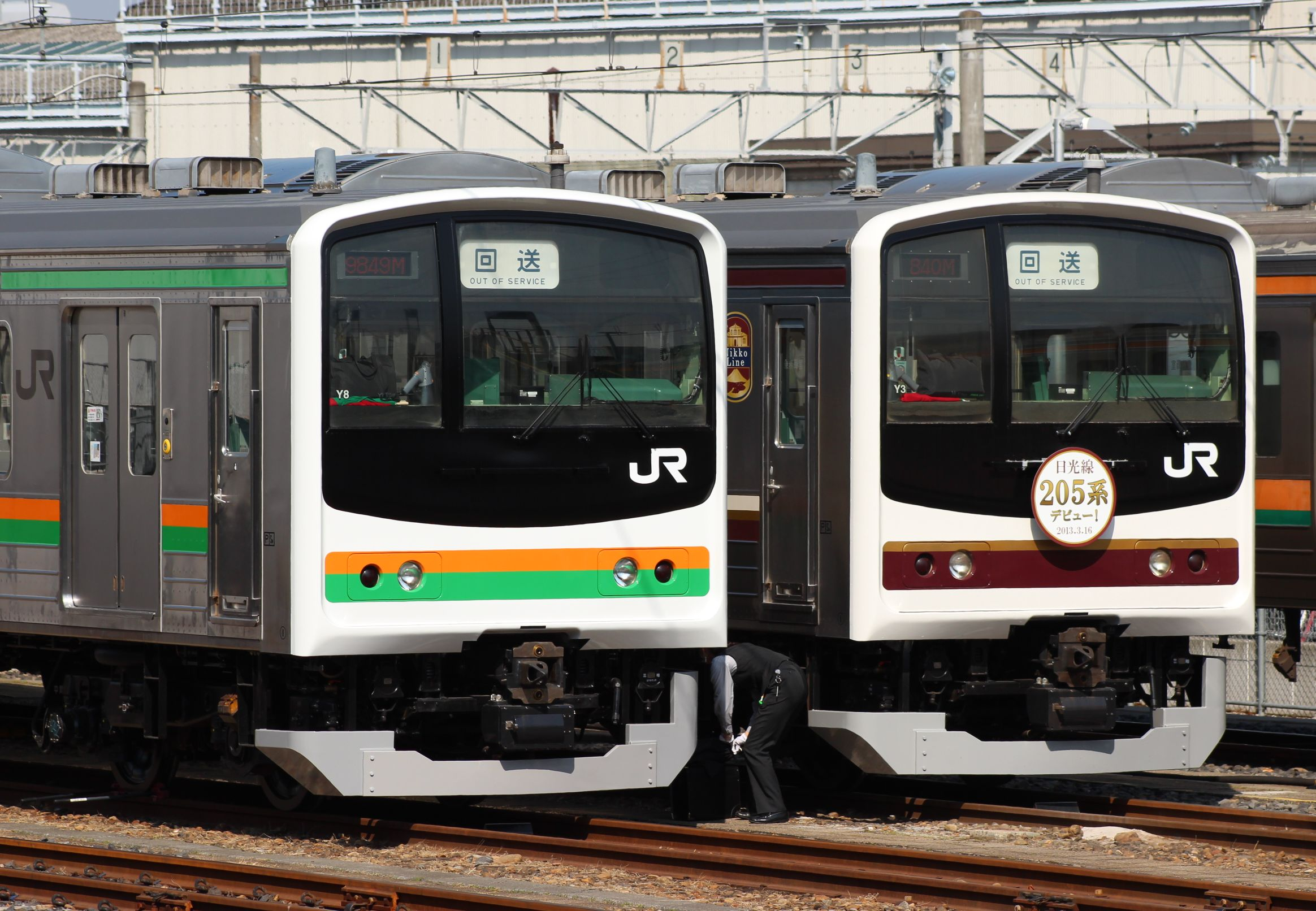
- 205-600 sets Y8 (left) and Y3 (right) in March 2013
- In service: March 2013–March 2022; 2018–March 2022 (Iroha Train Service)
- Replaced: 107 series
- Entered service: 16 March 2013
- Refurbished: 2012–2013; 2018
- Scrapped: 2022-2023
- Number in service: None
- Successor: E131-600 series
- Formation: 4 cars per set
- Fleet numbers: Y1–Y12
- Operator: JR East
- Depot: Oyama
- Lines served: Utsunomiya Line, Nikko Line

Specifications
- Car body construction: Stainless steel
- Car length: 20,000 mm (65 ft 7 in)
- Width: 2,800 mm (9 ft 2 in)
- Doors: 4 pairs per side
- Maximum speed: 100 km/h (62 mph)
- Acceleration: 1.7 km/(h⋅s) (1.1 mph/s)
- Deceleration: 3.6 km/(h⋅s) (2.2 mph/s)
- Electric system: 1,500 V DC overhead lines
- Current collection: Pantograph
- Bogies: DT50 (motored), TR235D (trailer)
- Safety systems: ATS-P, ATS-SN
- Track gauge: 1,067 mm (3 ft 6 in)

The 205-600 subseries was created in 2013, when cars from former Keiyo Line and Saikyo Line ten-car sets were reformed between 2012 and 2013 to create twelve four-car sets for use on Nikko Line and Utsunomiya Line services, entering service from 16 March 2013, replacing the ageing 107 series and 211 series sets. The four Nikko Line sets are finished in a livery with "classic ruby brown", "gold", and "cream" bodyside stripes. The Utsunomiya Line sets are finished in a livery with Shonan green and orange bodyside stripes. They were withdrawn on 11 March 2022 ahead of the introduction of newer E131-600 series trainsets.

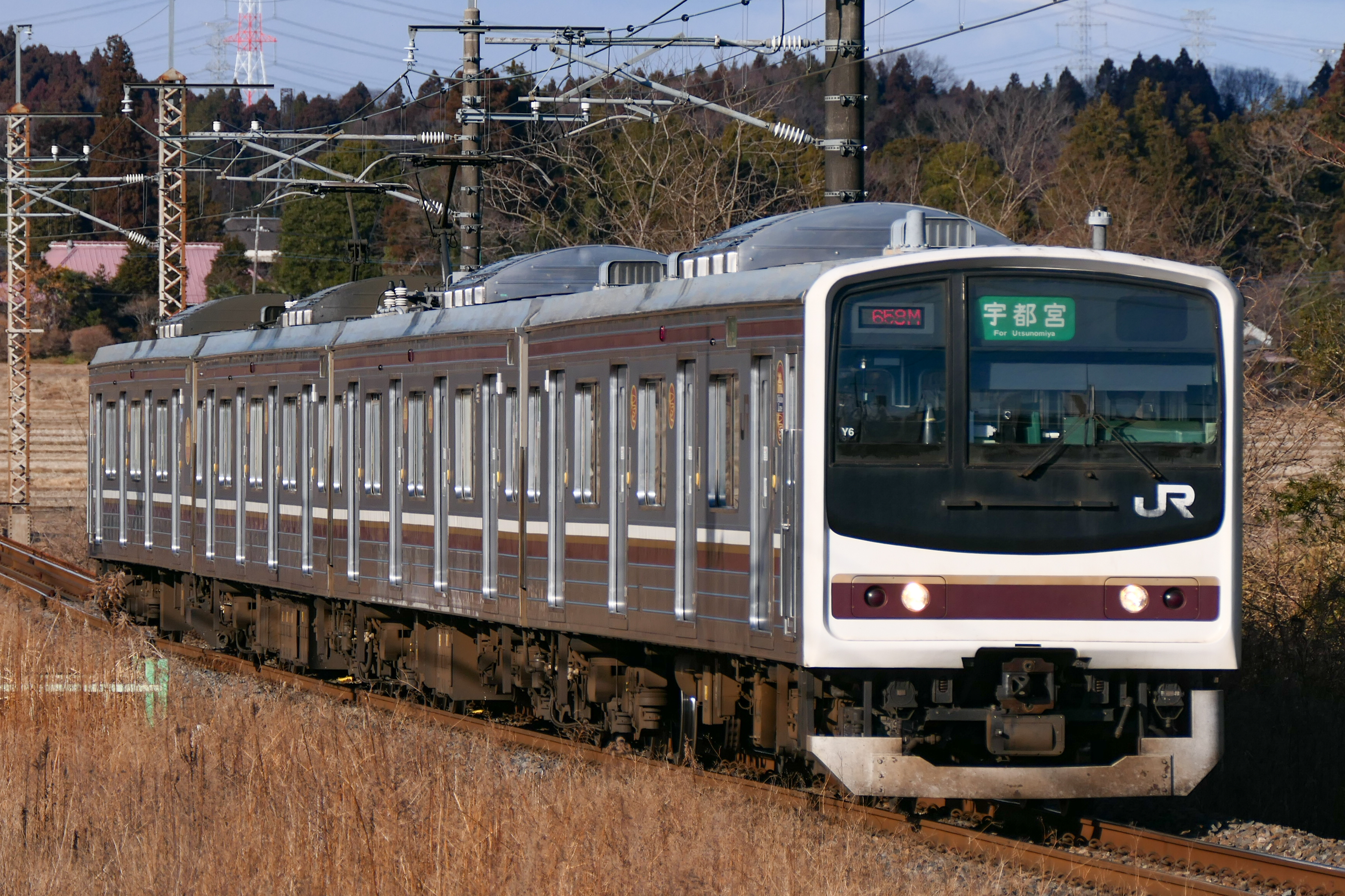
Set Y6 (former Keiyo Line set) on the Utsunomiya Line in February 2022

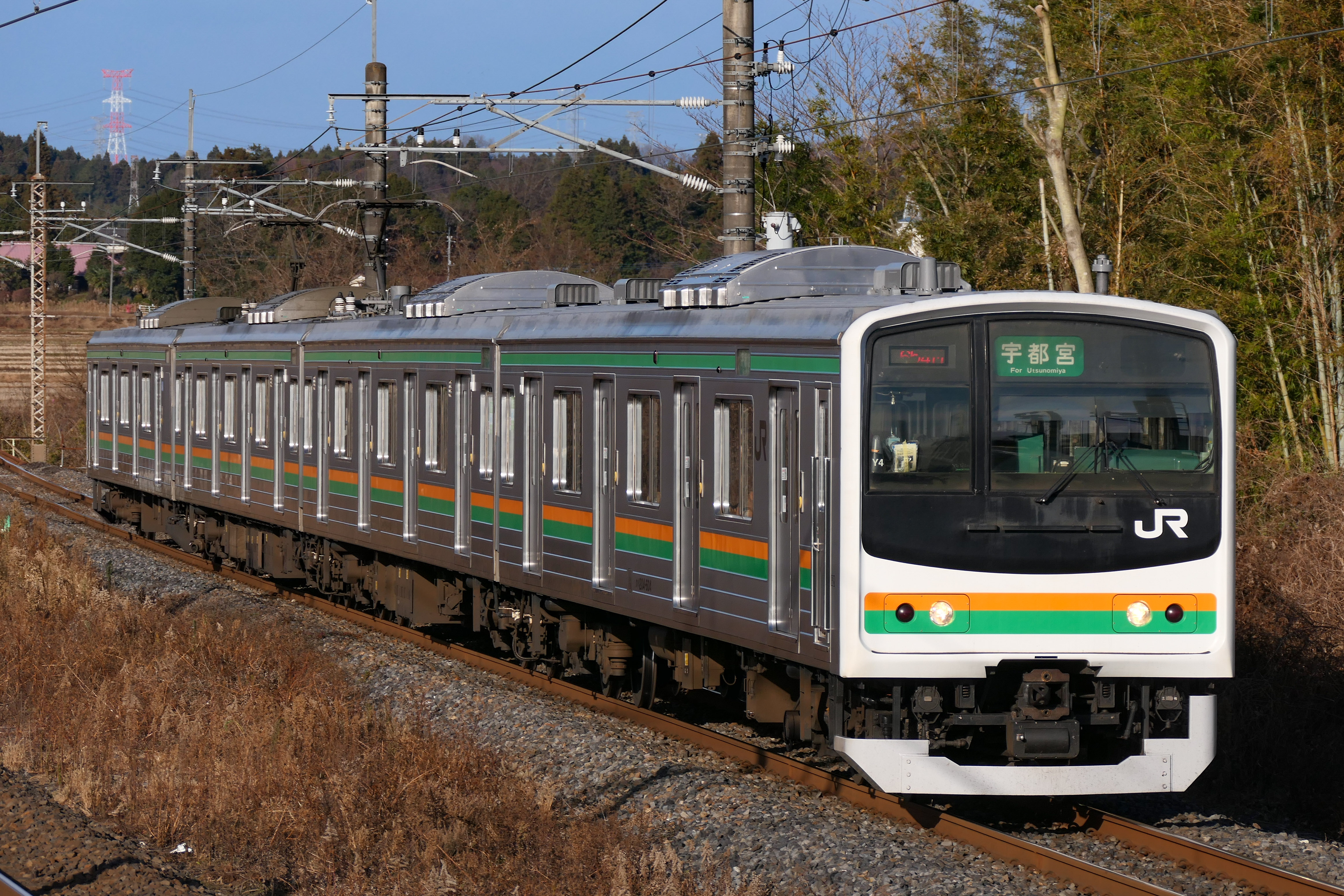
Set Y4 (former Keiyo Line set) on the Utsunomiya Line in December 2020

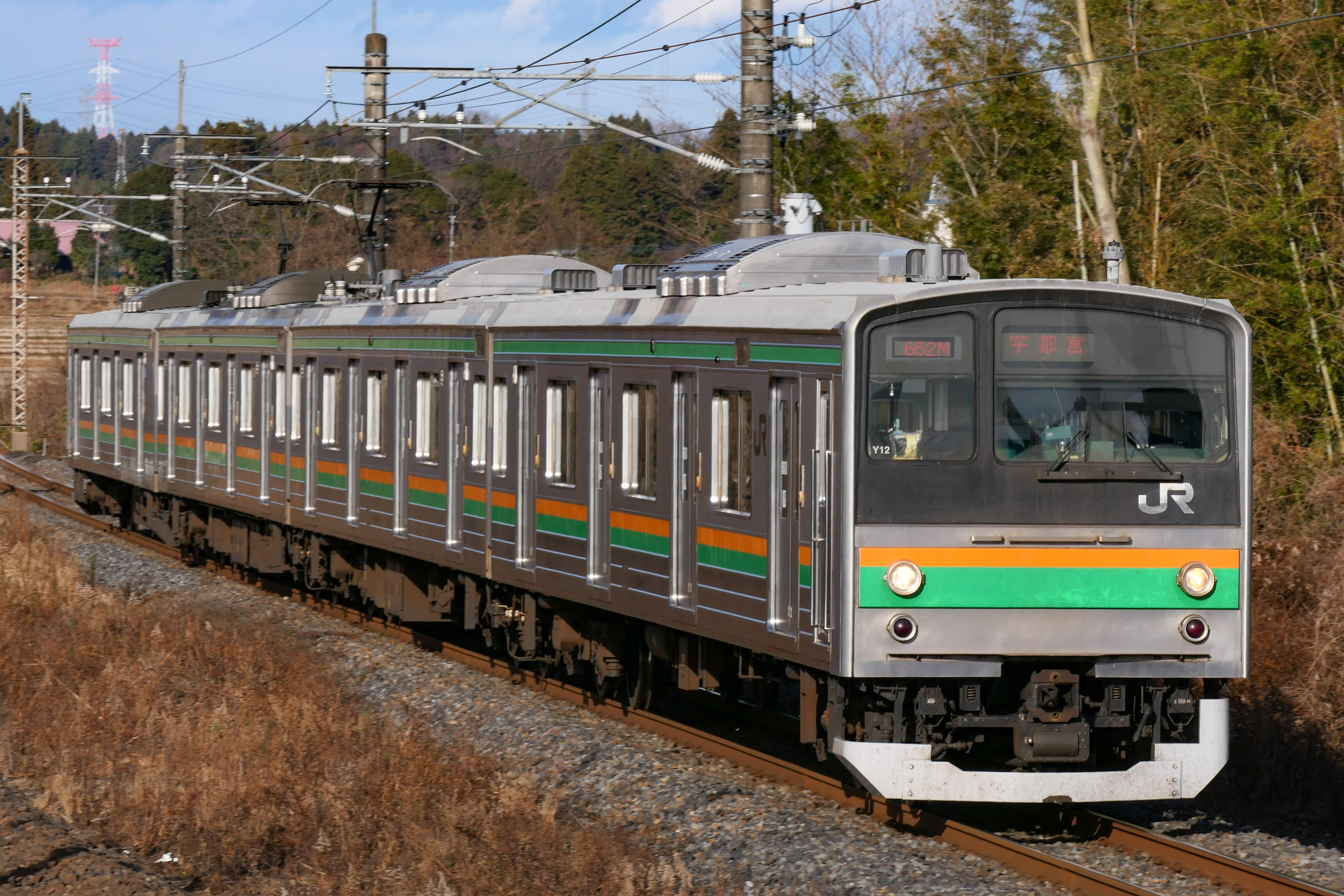
Set Y12 (former Saikyo Line set) on the Utsunomiya Line in December 2020

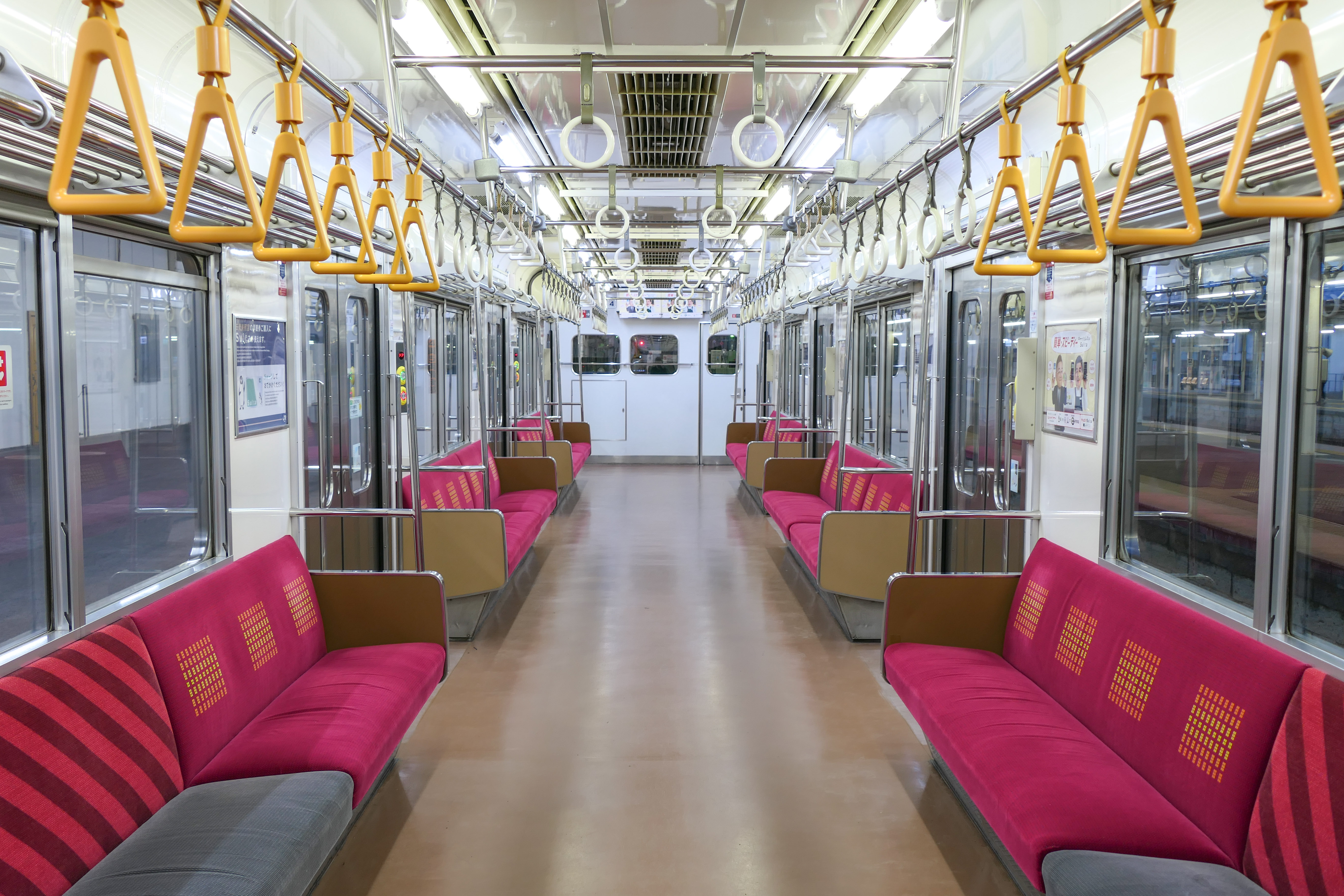
Interior

=== Formations ===
The four-car sets, numbered Y1 to Y12, were formed as shown below, with two motored (M) cars and two non-powered trailer (T) cars.

Car No.	1	2	3	4
Designation	Tc'	M'	M	Tc
Numbering	KuHa 204-600	MoHa 204-600	MoHa 205-600	KuHa 205-600
Weight (t)	25.3	34.5	33.1	26.4
Capacity (Total/seated)	136/48	144/54		139/42

- The MoHa 205-600 cars are equipped with two PS33F single-arm pantographs.
- The KuHa 205-600 cars have a wheelchair-accessible toilet.

=== Interior ===
Passenger accommodation consists of longitudinal bench seating throughout. A universal access toilet was added to the KuHa 205-600 car at the time of conversion.

=== Iroha ===
In 2018, set Y3 was refurbished for Iroha Joyful Train services on the Nikko Line. Two doors were removed per car, and box seating and luggage racks were introduced.

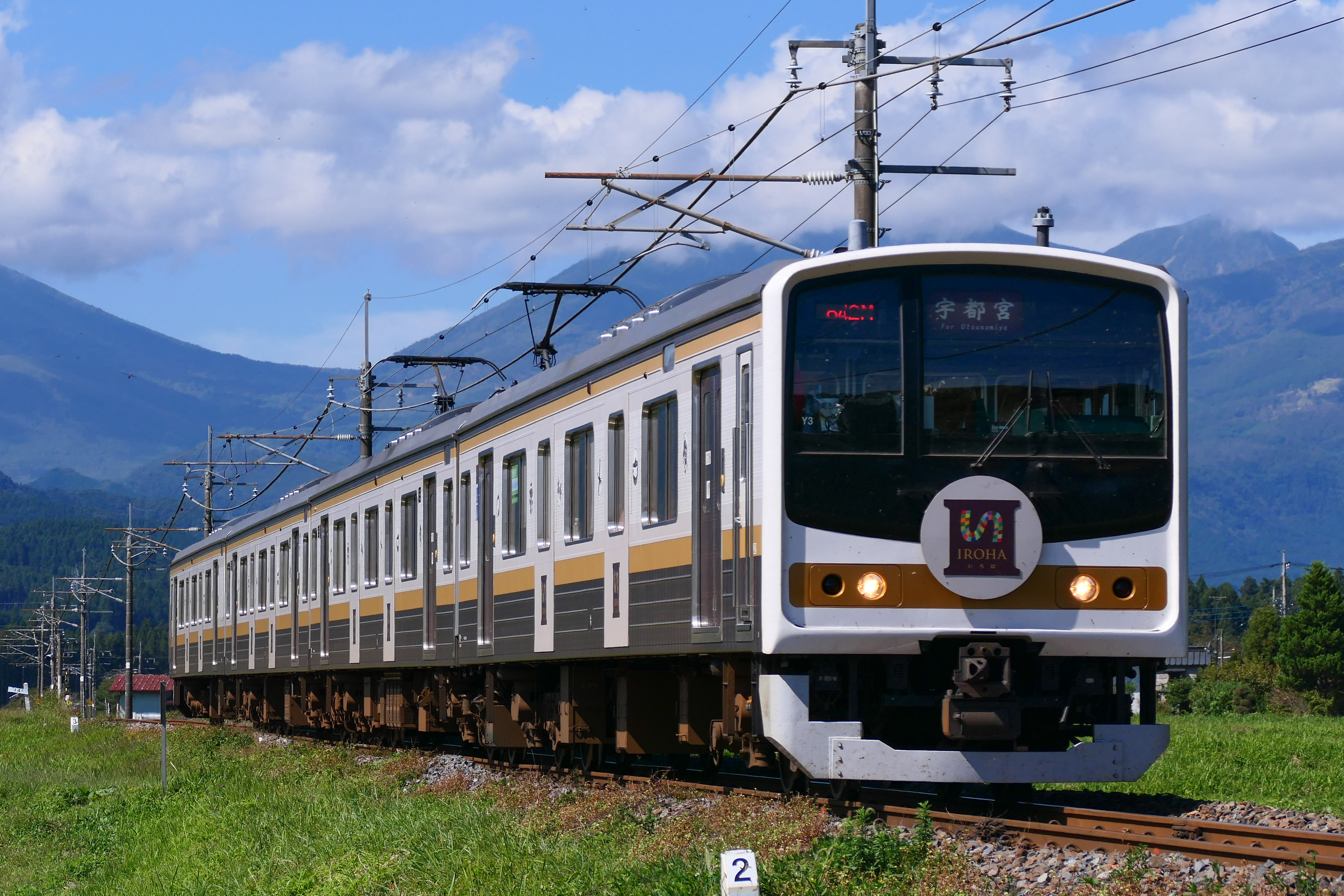
Exterior

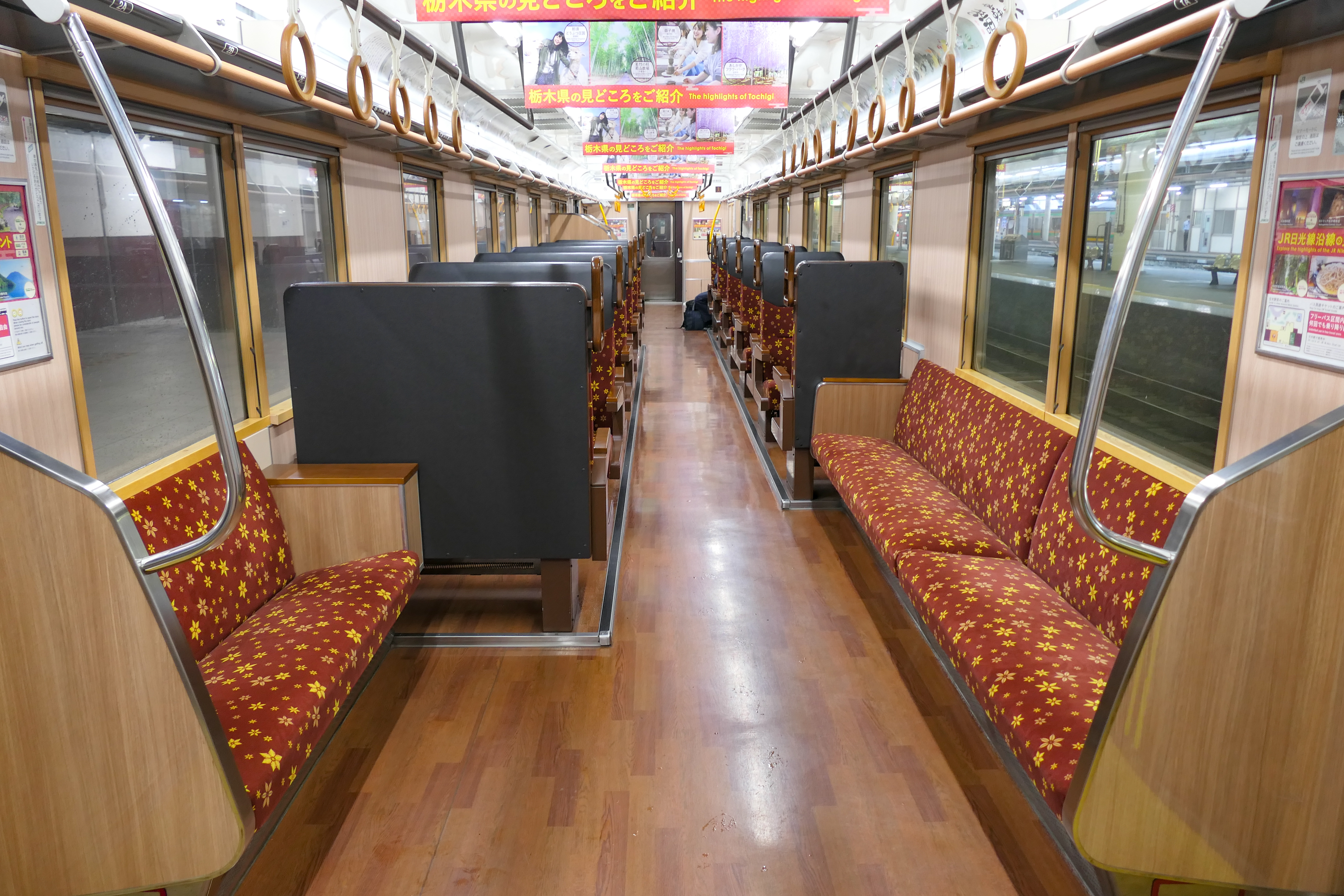
Interior

=== Fleet list ===
Set No.	Livery/line colour	Car numbers				Former set No.	Former car numbers			
Y1	Utsunomiya	KuHa 204-601	MoHa 204-601	MoHa 205-601	KuHa 205-601	Keiyo 2	KuHa 204-109	MoHa 204-295	MoHa 205-295	KuHa 205-109
Y2	Nikko	KuHa 204-602	MoHa 204-602	MoHa 205-602	KuHa 205-602	Keiyo 1	KuHa 204-108	MoHa 204-292	MoHa 205-292	KuHa 205-108
Y3	Iroha	KuHa 204-603	MoHa 204-603	MoHa 205-603	KuHa 205-603	Keiyo 4	KuHa 204-111	MoHa 204-301	MoHa 205-301	KuHa 205-111
Y4	Utsunomiya	KuHa 204-604	MoHa 204-604	MoHa 205-604	KuHa 205-604	Keiyo 3	KuHa 204-110	MoHa 204-298	MoHa 205-298	KuHa 205-110
Y5	Utsunomiya	KuHa 204-605	MoHa 204-605	MoHa 205-605	KuHa 205-605	Keiyo 6	KuHa 204-113	MoHa 204-307	MoHa 205-307	KuHa 205-113
Y6	Nikko	KuHa 204-606	MoHa 204-606	MoHa 205-606	KuHa 205-606	Keiyo 5	KuHa 204-112	MoHa 204-304	MoHa 205-304	KuHa 205-112
Y7	Utsunomiya	KuHa 204-607	MoHa 204-607	MoHa 205-607	KuHa 205-607	Keiyo 8	KuHa 204-115	MoHa 204-313	MoHa 205-313	KuHa 205-115
Y8	Utsunomiya	KuHa 204-608	MoHa 204-608	MoHa 205-608	KuHa 205-608	Keiyo 7	KuHa 204-114	MoHa 204-310	MoHa 205-310	KuHa 205-114
Y9	Utsunomiya	KuHa 204-609	MoHa 204-609	MoHa 205-609	KuHa 205-609	Keiyo 10	KuHa 204-117	MoHa 204-319	MoHa 205-319	KuHa 205-117
Y10	Nikko	KuHa 204-610	MoHa 204-610	MoHa 205-610	KuHa 205-610	Keiyo 9	KuHa 204-116	MoHa 204-316	MoHa 205-316	KuHa 205-116
Y11	Utsunomiya	KuHa 204-611	MoHa 204-611	MoHa 205-611	KuHa 205-611	Kawagoe (HaE) 16	KuHa 204-125	MoHa 204-341	MoHa 205-341	KuHa 205-125
Y12	Utsunomiya	KuHa 204-612	MoHa 204-612	MoHa 205-612	KuHa 205-612	Kawagoe (HaE) 17	KuHa 204-124	MoHa 204-338	MoHa 205-338	KuHa 205-124

== 205-1000 series (JR East) ==
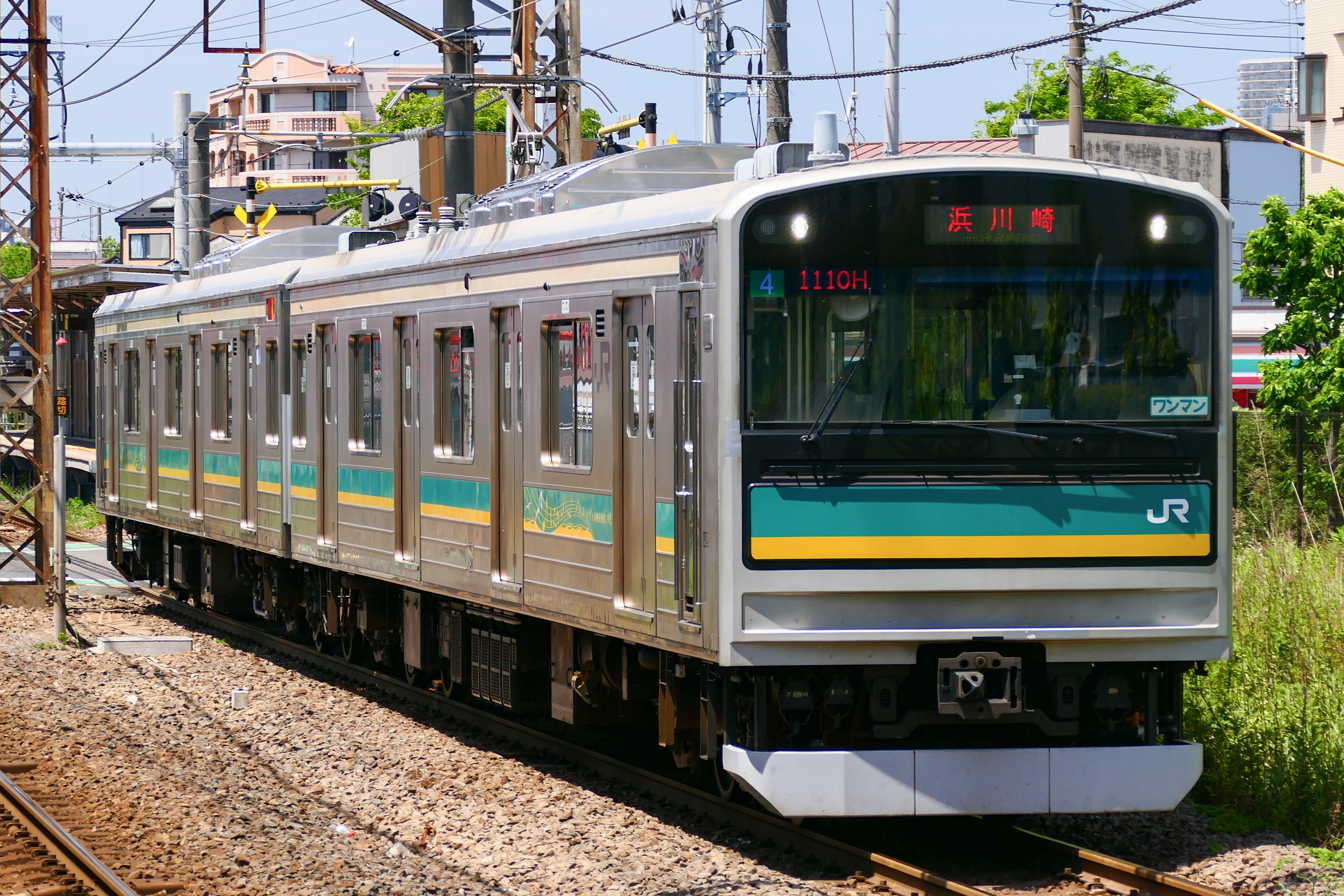
A Nambu Branch Line 205-1000 series trainset in May 2023

The 205–1000 series of JR East operates as 2-car trainsets rebuilt from some former 205–0 series cars, which were used on the Nambu Branch Line since 2002, replacing the last standing cars of the ageing 101 series trains until 2003. As of 2024, three two-car sets are in operation.

← Hama-kawasaki Shitte →
Car No.	1	2
Designation	KuMoHa 204	KuMoHa 205

== 205-1000 series (JR West) ==
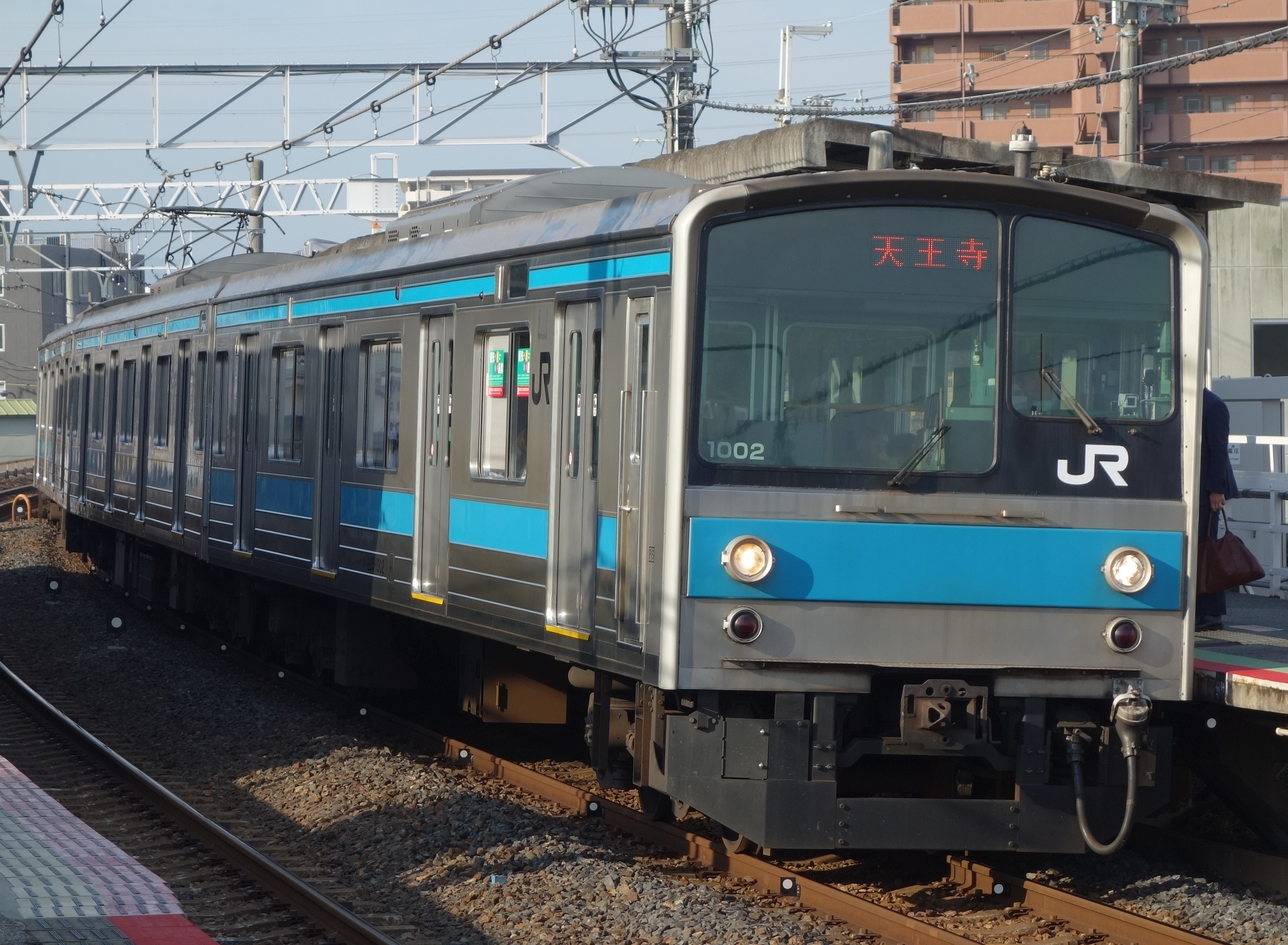
A JR West 205-1000 series trainset on the Hanwa Line, June 2016

The 205–1000 series of JR West was built into 4-car trainsets in 1988, they formerly operated in Hanwa Line services from March 1988 until they ended their operations in March 2018, and then they were transferred ahead to the Nara Line for local train services since 18 March 2018. Features include having a different windshield panel design, which is likely inverted their directions to avoid confusion of the pre-existing 205–0 series, which were formerly Tokaido Line Local Services in same blue stripe during that time.

As of 2024, nine 4-car sets are in operation, bearing the set numbers NE401 to NE409.

← Kyoto Nara →
Car No.	1	2	3	4
Designation	KuHa 204	MoHa 204	MoHa 205	KuHa 205

== 205-1100 series ==
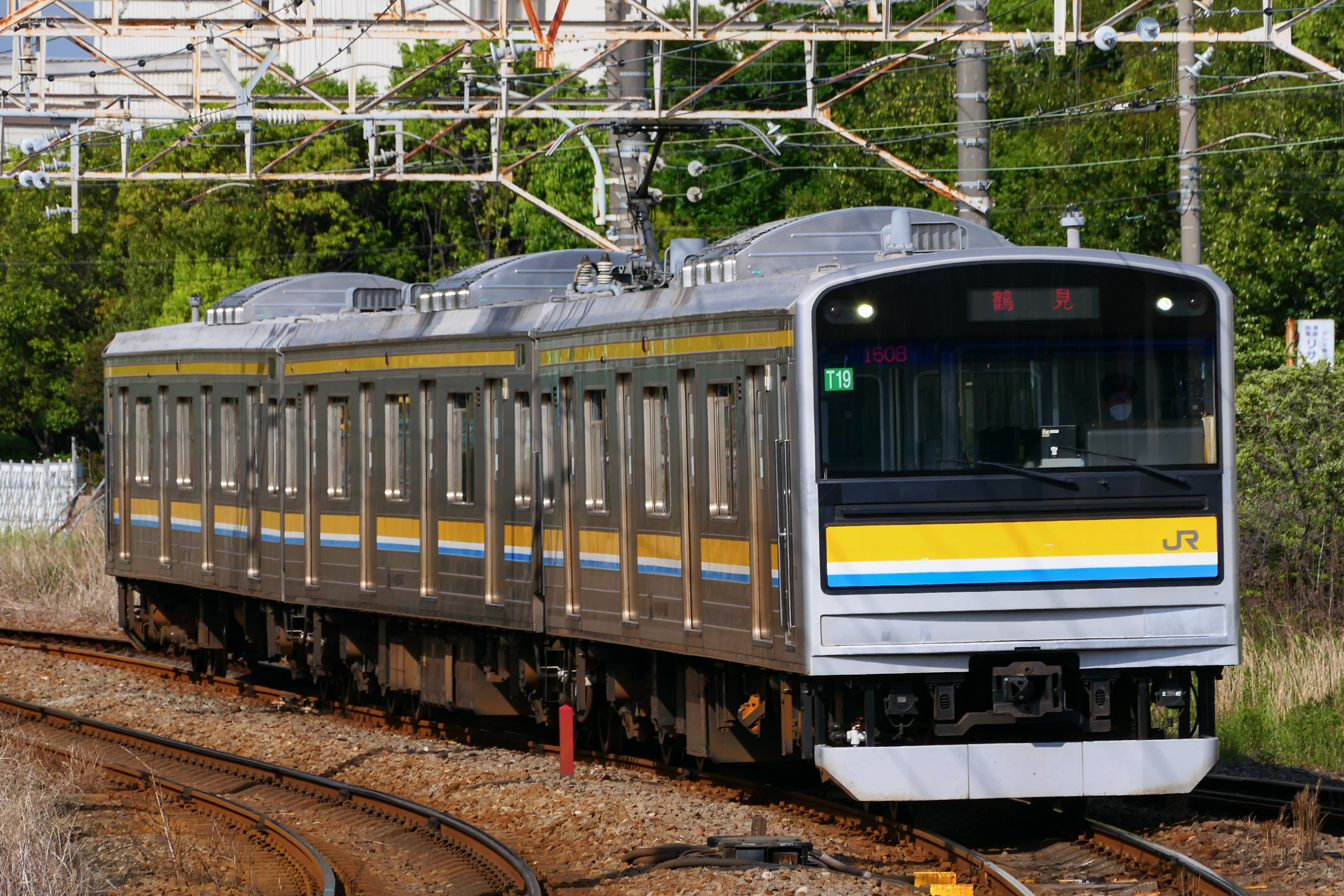
A Tsurumi Line 205-1100 series trainset in May 2023

The 205–1100 series of JR East operates as 3-car trainsets rebuilt from former 205–0 series cars, which were introduced on the Tsurumi Line since August 2004, replacing the aging 103 series cars until their retirement in 2006. As of 2024, three 3-car sets are in operation.

← Okawa Tsurumi→
Car No.	1	2	3
Designation	KuHa 205	MoHa 205	KuMoHa 204

== 205-1200 series ==
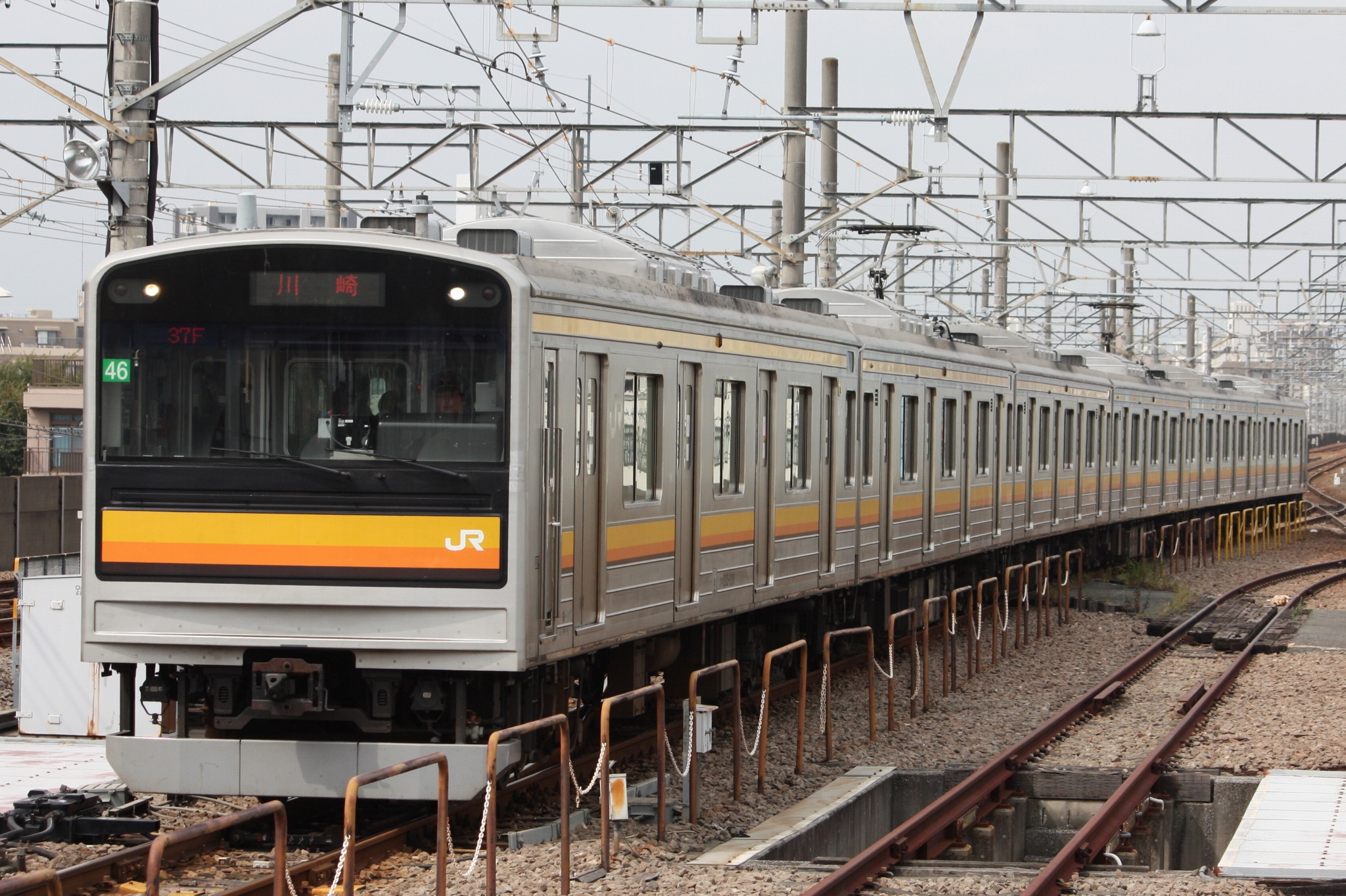
A Nambu Line 205-1200 series trainset in October 2014

The 205–1200 series of JR East operates as six-car trainsets rebuilt from former 205–0 series cars, used on the Nambu Line services from 2004 until they were replaced by the new E233-8000 series trainsets until January 2016.

== 205-3000 series ==
205-3000 series
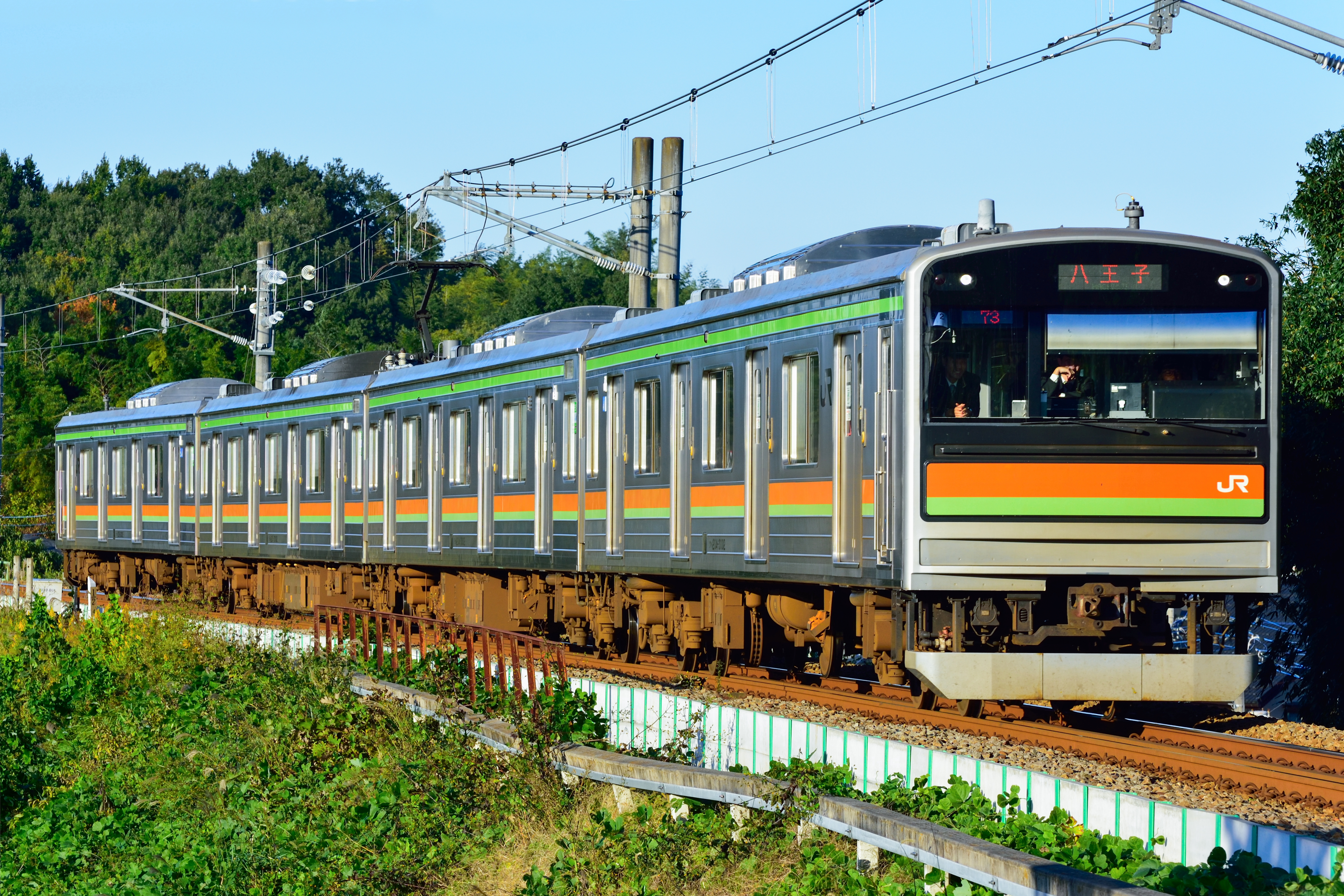
- JR East 205-3000 series EMU set 82 between Komiya and Kita-Hachioji stations on the Hachiko Line
- In service: 2003–July 2018
- Replaced: 103-3000 series
- Constructed: 1985–1986
- Refurbished: 2003–2005
- Scrapped: 2018–2019
- Number built: 20 vehicles (5 sets)
- Number in service: 0 vehicles (6 cars converted to Fujikyu 6000 series)
- Number scrapped: 14 vehicles
- Successor: 209-3500 series, E231-3000 series
- Formation: 4 cars per set
- Operator: JR East
- Depot: Kawagoe
- Lines served: Hachiko Line; Kawagoe Line

Specifications
- Doors: 4 pairs per side
- Maximum speed: 100 km/h (62 mph)
- Bogies: DT50 (motored), TR235D (trailer)
- Safety systems: ATS-P, ATS-SN
- Track gauge: 1,067 mm (3 ft 6 in)

The 205–3000 series are 4-car trainsets rebuilt from former 205–0 series cars, which were used on the Kawagoe Line and Hachiko Line from 2003 up until 2018.

=== Formation ===
From November 2003 until July 2018, five 4-car sets were allocated to Kawagoe Depot for use on Hachiko Line and Kawagoe Line through services. These sets were formed as follows with two motored ("M") cars and two non-powered trailer ("T") cars.

	← Kawagoe Hachiōji →			
Car No.	4	3	2	1
Designation	Tc	M	M'	Tc'
Numbering	KuHa 209-3000	MoHa 209-3000	MoHa 208-3000	KuHa 208-3000

- Car 3 was originally fitted with a PS21 lozenge type pantograph, but they were converted into a PS33C single-arm type between April 2004 to February 2005.

== 205-3100 series ==
205-3100 series
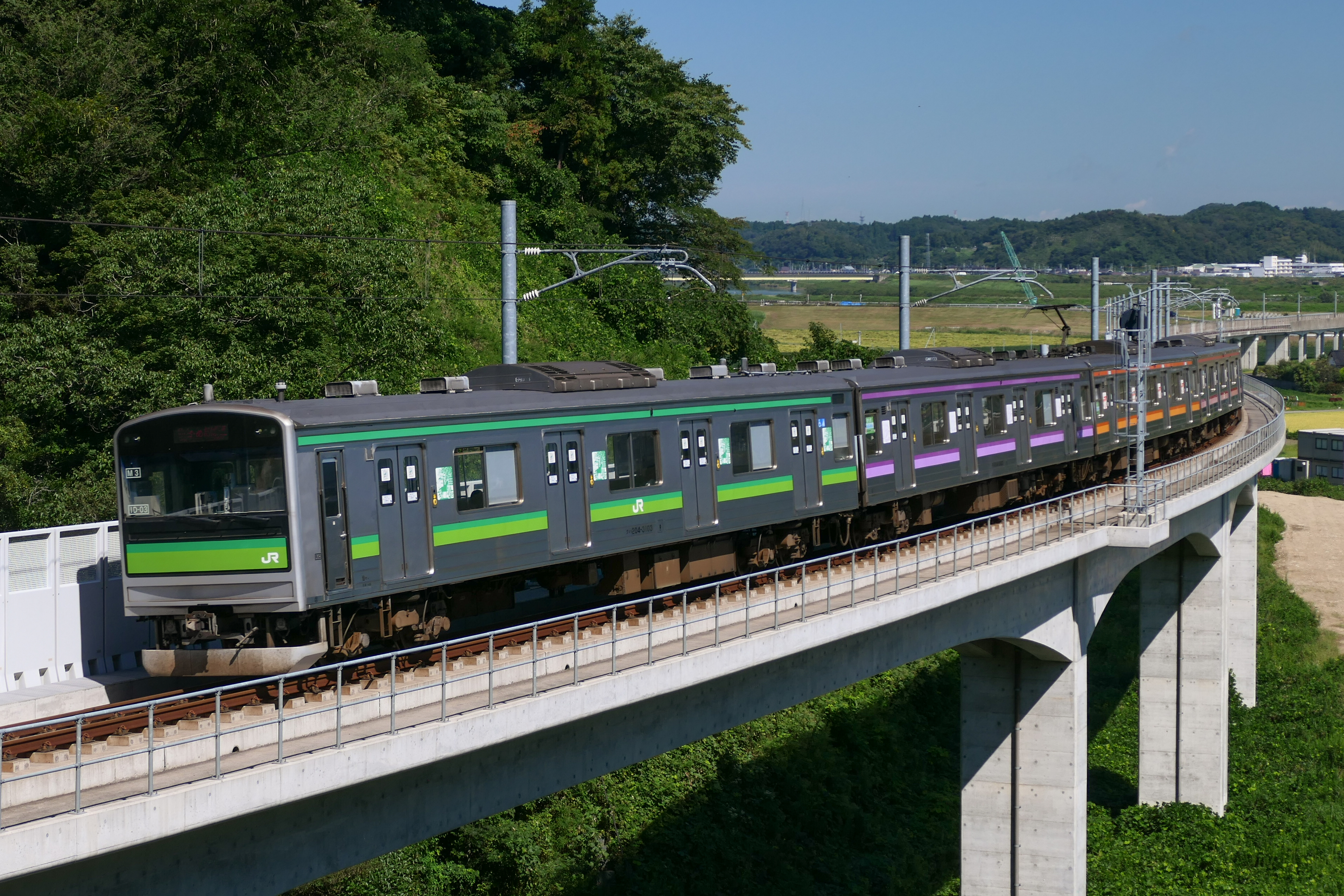
- 205-3100 series (set M3) in September 2021
- In service: 2002–2026
- Replaced: 103 series
- Constructed: 1985–1986
- Entered service: 2002
- Refurbished: 2002–2004
- Scrapped: 2011–
- Number built: 76 vehicles (19 sets)
- Number in service: None
- Number scrapped: 8 vehicles (2 sets), due to damage from Great Eastern Japan Earthquake
- Successor: E131-800 series
- Formation: 4 cars per set
- Fleet numbers: M1–M19
- Operator: JR East
- Depot: Miyagino
- Line served: Senseki Line

Specifications
- Car length: 20,000 mm (65 ft 7 in)
- Width: 2,800 mm (9 ft 2 in)
- Doors: 4 pairs per side
- Maximum speed: 100 km/h (60 mph)
- Acceleration: 1.7 km/h/s
- Deceleration: 3.6 km/h/s
- Electric system: 1,500 V DC overhead lines
- Current collection: Pantograph
- Bogies: DT50 (motored), TR235D (trailer)
- Safety systems: ATACS, ATS-Ps
- Track gauge: 1,067 mm (3 ft 6 in)

The 205‑3100 series are 4-car trainsets designated for operation on the Senseki Line.

With the start of the revised timetable on 14 March 2026, the 205‑3100 series was withdrawn from regular service on the Senseki Line.

=== Formations ===
As of April 2020, 17 4-car sets are allocated to Miyagino Depot. These sets are formed as follows with two motored ("M") cars and two non-powered trailer ("T") cars.

	← Ishinomaki Aoba-dori →			
Designation	Tc	M	M'	Tc'
Numbering	KuHa 205-3100	MoHa 205-3100	MoHa 204-3100	KuHa 204-3100

- The MoHa 205 car has two single-arm pantographs.

=== Special liveries ===
Two 4-car sets are designated as "Mangattan Liner" sets which feature artwork by local manga artist Shotaro Ishinomori.

=== Disposal ===
Two 4-car sets, M7 and M9, were scrapped after damage from the 2011 Great East Japan Earthquake.

=== Gallery ===
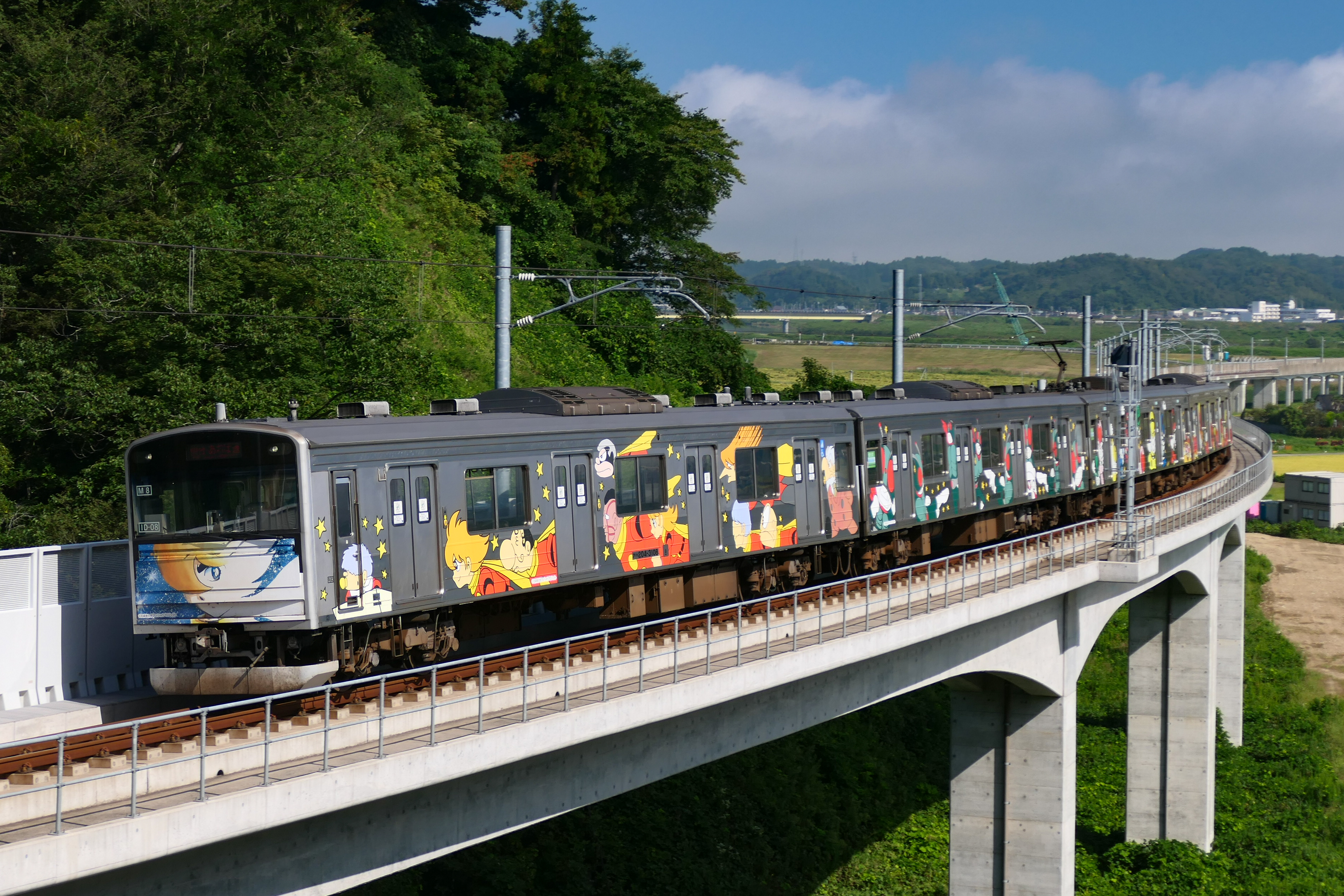
Senseki Line "Mangattan Liner" trainset (set M8) in September 2021

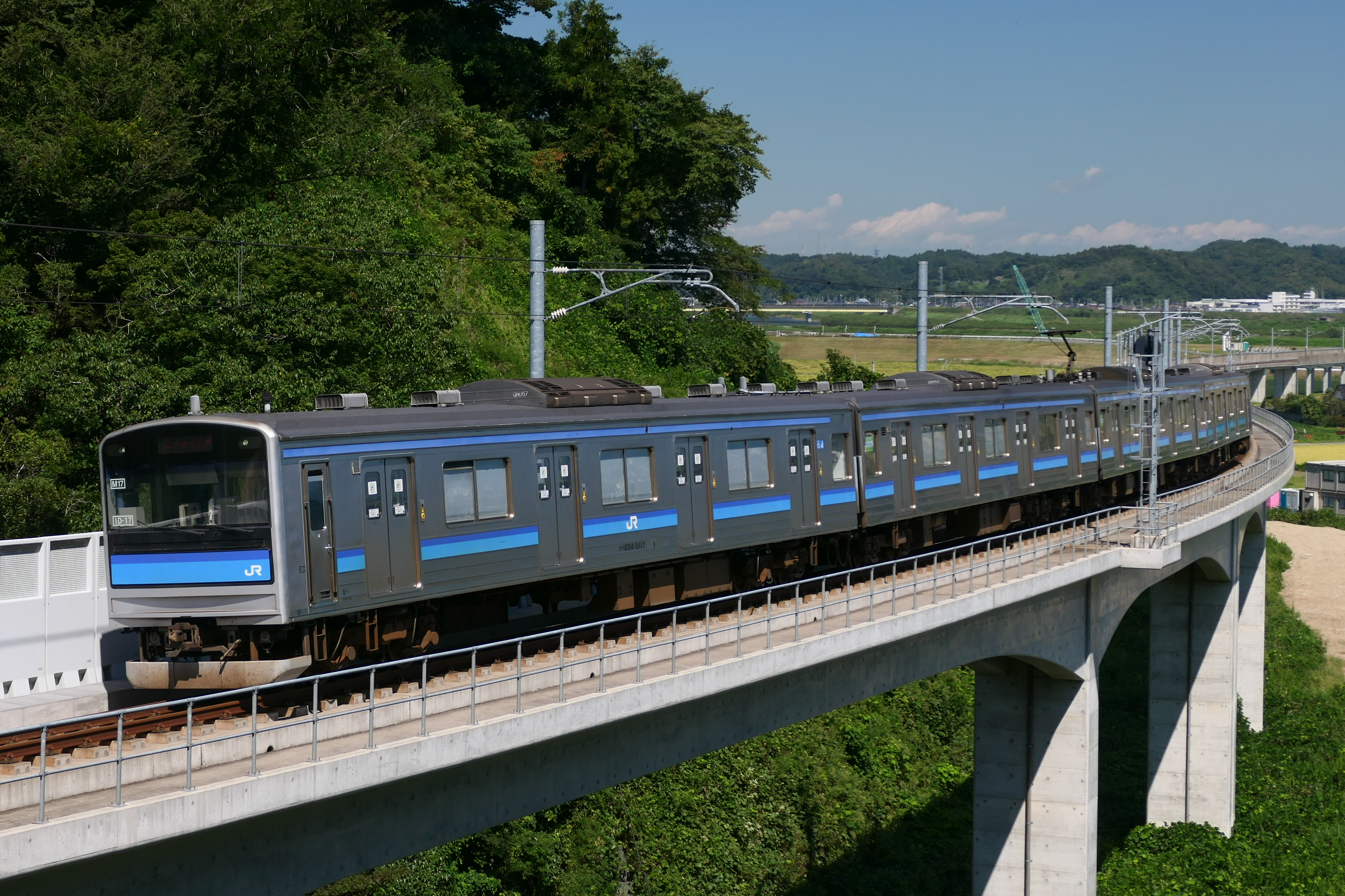
Same series (Set M17) With Standard JR livery

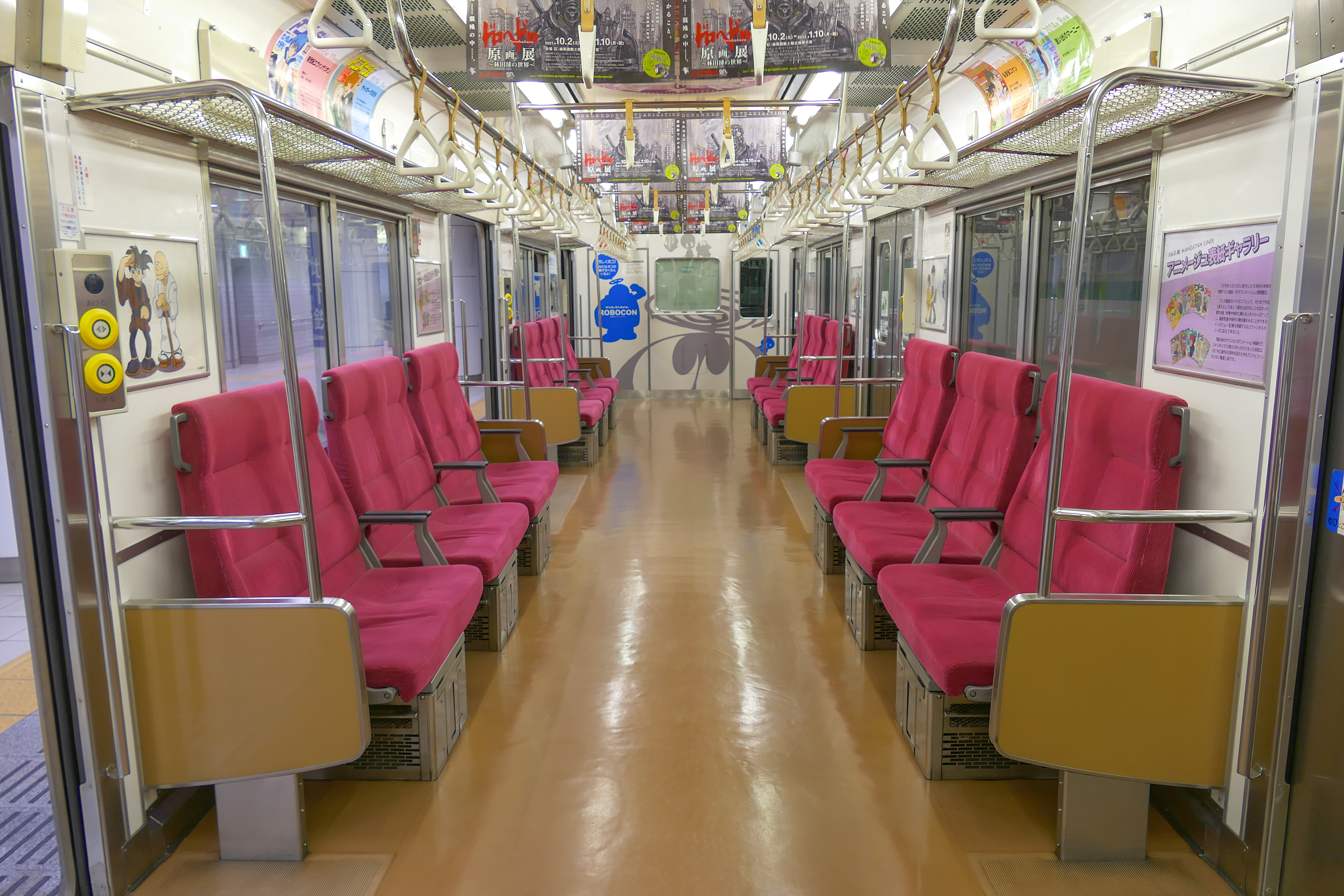
Interior

== 205-5000 series ==
205-5000 series
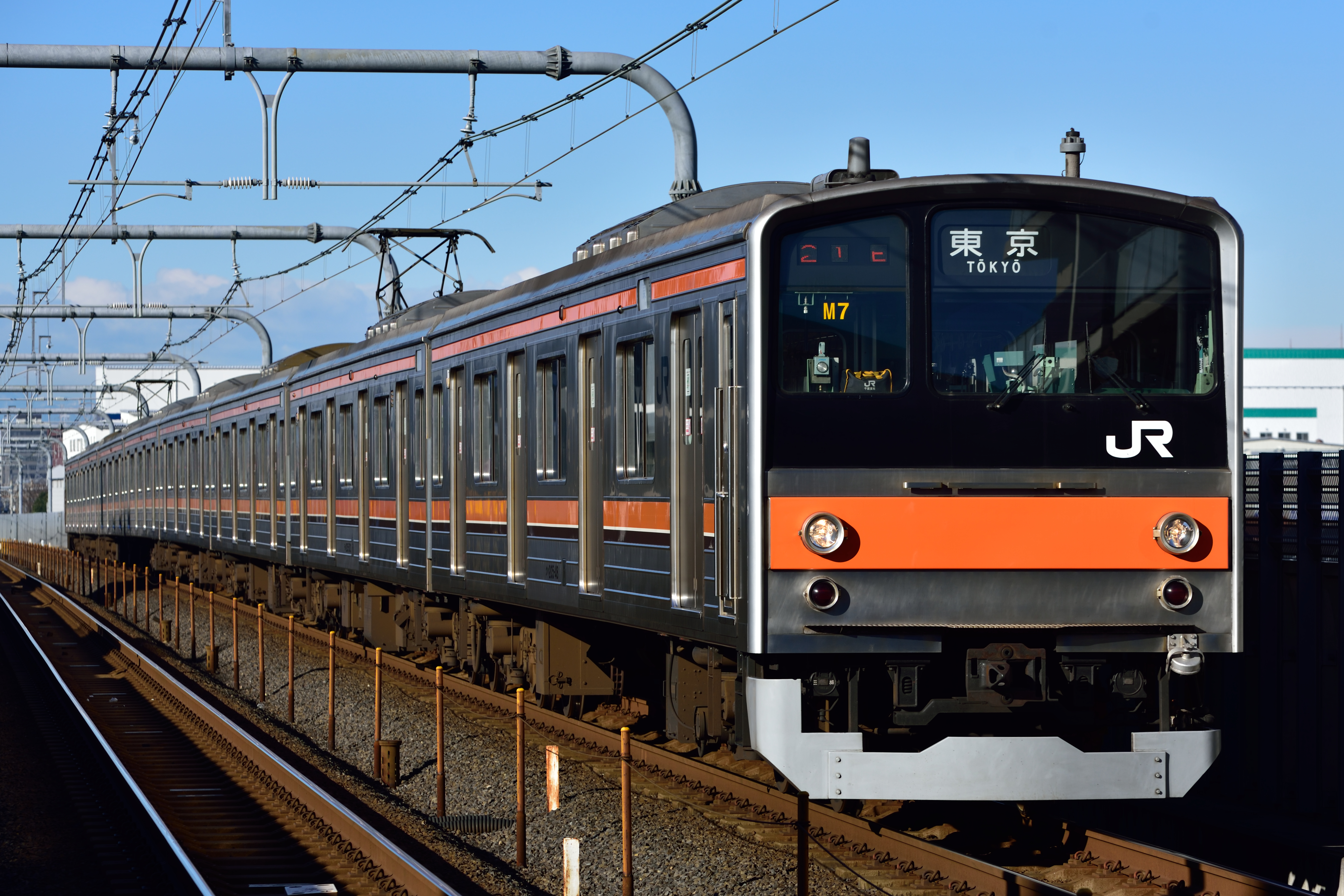
- JR East 205 series EMU set M7 approaching Koshigaya Laketown Station on a Musashino Line service to Tokyo, 2017.
- In service: 2002–October 2020 (Japan); 2018–present (Indonesia)
- Replaced: 103 series (Japan), Tokyo Metro 5000 series, Toyo Rapid 1000 series (Indonesia)
- Constructed: 1985–1991
- Entered service: 2002
- Refurbished: 2002–2005; 2008
- Number built: 288 vehicles (36 sets)
- Number in service: 288 vehicles (36 sets) (as of December 2020, Indonesia)
- Formation: 8 cars per set (Japan); 8, 10 or 12 cars per set (Indonesia)
- Fleet numbers: M1-M36 (Japan), 5-145 (Indonesia)
- Operators: JR East (2002–October 2020); KAI Commuter (March 2018–present)
- Depots: Keiyō, Bukit Duri, Depok, Bogor, Klaten
- Lines served: Former: Musashino Line; Keiyo Line; KAI Commuter Loop Line; Current: KAI Commuter Cikarang Loop Line; KAI Commuter Bogor Line; KAI Commuter Rangkasbitung Line; KAI Commuter Tangerang Line; KAI Commuter Yogyakarta Line (2 Trainset); KAI Commuter Tanjung Priok Line

Specifications
- Car body construction: Stainless steel
- Car length: 20,000 mm (65 ft 7 in)
- Width: 2,800 mm (9 ft 2 in)
- Doors: 4 pairs per side
- Maximum speed: 100 km/h (62 mph)
- Weight: 33.3 t (MoHa 204); 31.1 t (MoHa 205)
- Traction system: IGBT-VVVF toyo denki SC71 traction motors
- Power output: 120 kW × 4 three-phase induction motor
- Acceleration: 3.2 km/(h⋅s) (2.0 mph/s)
- Deceleration: 3.6 km/(h⋅s) (2.2 mph/s)
- Electric system: 1,500 V DC overhead lines
- Current collection: Pantograph
- Bogies: DT70 (motored), TR235D (trailer)
- Safety systems: ATS-P, ATS-SN
- Track gauge: 1,067 mm (3 ft 6 in)

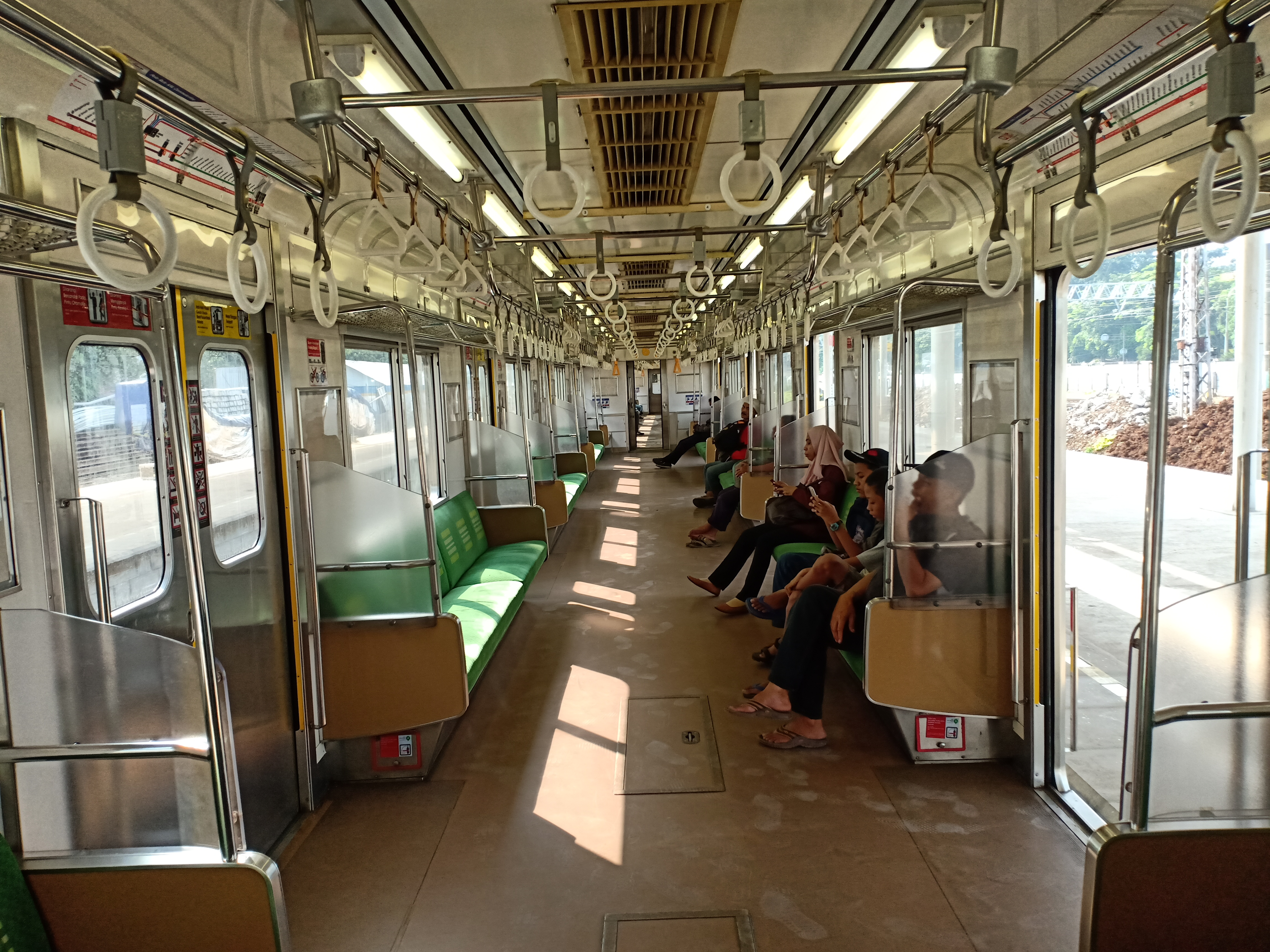
Interior of 205 set 29 (formerly set M15) in June 2018

The 205–5000 series are fitted with two-level insulated gate bipolar transistor variable frequency drives as a traction system which produce a distinctive, high-pitched whine and it is one of the latest refurbished trains among 205-series which is specifically unique compared to the other refurbished 205 series classification which their former Yamanote Line 205–0 series cars were modified with new VVVF-controlled AC motors between 2002 and 2008, used on the Musashino Line & some parts of Keiyō Line to be scheduled for ending operations on the late 2020 prior to the acquisition all of these trainsets for overseas use to be shipped to Jakarta, Indonesia to be operated by Kereta Commuter Indonesia from 2018 to 2020.

Upon resale & overseas use, there are 288 vehicles (36 eight-car trainsets) for 205–5000 series withdrawn from the Musashino Line are scheduled to be shipped to Jakarta between March 2018 and 2020.

=== Formations ===
==== KAI Commuter sets ====
As of December 2020, four 8-car sets, six 10-car sets, and fifteen 12-car sets are allocated to Bukit Duri, Depok, and Klaten Depot for use on the Duri-Tangerang Line, Jakarta Kota-Bogor Line, Jatinegara-Bogor Line, Rangkasbitung Line, Jakarta Kota-Cikarang Line, and Yogyakarta Line through services. These sets are formed as follows with four motored ("M") cars and four non-powered ("T") cars.

The 8-car 205 series subsection 5000 without middle cabin formation is as follows.

	← Jakarta Kota, Jatinegara Bogor, Tanjung Priok →							
Car No.	1	2	3	4	5	6	7	8
Designation	Tc	M	M'	T		M	M'	Tc'
Numbering	KuHa 205-0	MoHa 205-5000	MoHa 204-5000	SaHa 205-0		MoHa 205-5000	MoHa 204-5000	KuHa 204-0

The 10-car 205 series subsection 5000 with middle cabin formation is as follows.

	← Jakarta Kota, Tanah Abang, Angke Bogor, Nambo, Cikarang, Rangkasbitung →									
Car No.	1	2	3	4	5	6	7	8	9	10
Designation	Tc	M	M'	M	M'	Tc'	Tc	M	M'	Tc'
Numbering	KuHa 205-0	MoHa 205-5000	MoHa 204-5000	MoHa 205-5000	MoHa 204-5000	KuHa 204-0	KuHa 205-0	MoHa 205-5000	MoHa 204-5000	KuHa 204-0

The 10-car 205 series subsection 5000 without middle cabin formation is as follows.

	← Jakarta Kota, Angke, Tanah Abang Bogor, Nambo, Cikarang, Rangkasbitung, Tangerang →									
Car No.	1	2	3	4	5	6	7	8	9	10
Designation	Tc	M	M'	T	T	M	M'	M	M'	Tc'
Numbering	KuHa 205-0	MoHa 205-5000	MoHa 204-5000	SaHa 205-0	SaHa 205-0	MoHa 205-5000	MoHa 204-5000	MoHa 205-5000	MoHa 204-5000	KuHa 204-0
Designation	Tc	T	M	M'	T	T	M	M'	T	Tc'
Numbering	KuHa 205-0	SaHa 205-0	MoHa 205-5000	MoHa 204-5000	SaHa 205-0	SaHa 205-0	MoHa 205-5000	MoHa 204-5000	SaHa 205-0	KuHa 204-0

The 12-car 205 series subsection 5000 with middle cabin formation is as follows.

	← Jakarta Kota, Duri Bogor, Cikarang, Tangerang →											
Car No.	1	2	3	4	5	6	7	8	9	10	11	12
Designation	Tc	M	M'	T		M	M'	Tc'	Tc	M	M'	Tc'
Numbering	KuHa 205-0	MoHa 205-5000	MoHa 204-5000	SaHa 205-0		MoHa 205-5000	MoHa 204-5000	KuHa 204-0	KuHa 205-0	MoHa 205-5000	MoHa 204-5000	KuHa 204-0

The 12-car 205 series subsection 5000 without middle cabin formation is as follows.

	← Jakarta Kota, Duri Bogor, Cikarang, Tangerang →											
Car No.	1	2	3	4	5	6	7	8	9	10	11	12
Designation	Tc	M	M'	T		M	M'	T		M	M'	Tc'
Numbering	KuHa 205-0	MoHa 205-5000	MoHa 204-5000	SaHa 205-0		MoHa 205-5000	MoHa 204-5000	SaHa 205-0	SaHa 204-0	MoHa 205-5000	MoHa 204-5000	KuHa 204-0

- Cars 2 and 6 (for 8 car, 12 car, and some of the 10 car), 3 and 7 (for 10 car), and 10 (12 car) each have one lozenge-type pantograph.
- Car 4 is designated as a mildly air-conditioned car.

=== Gallery ===
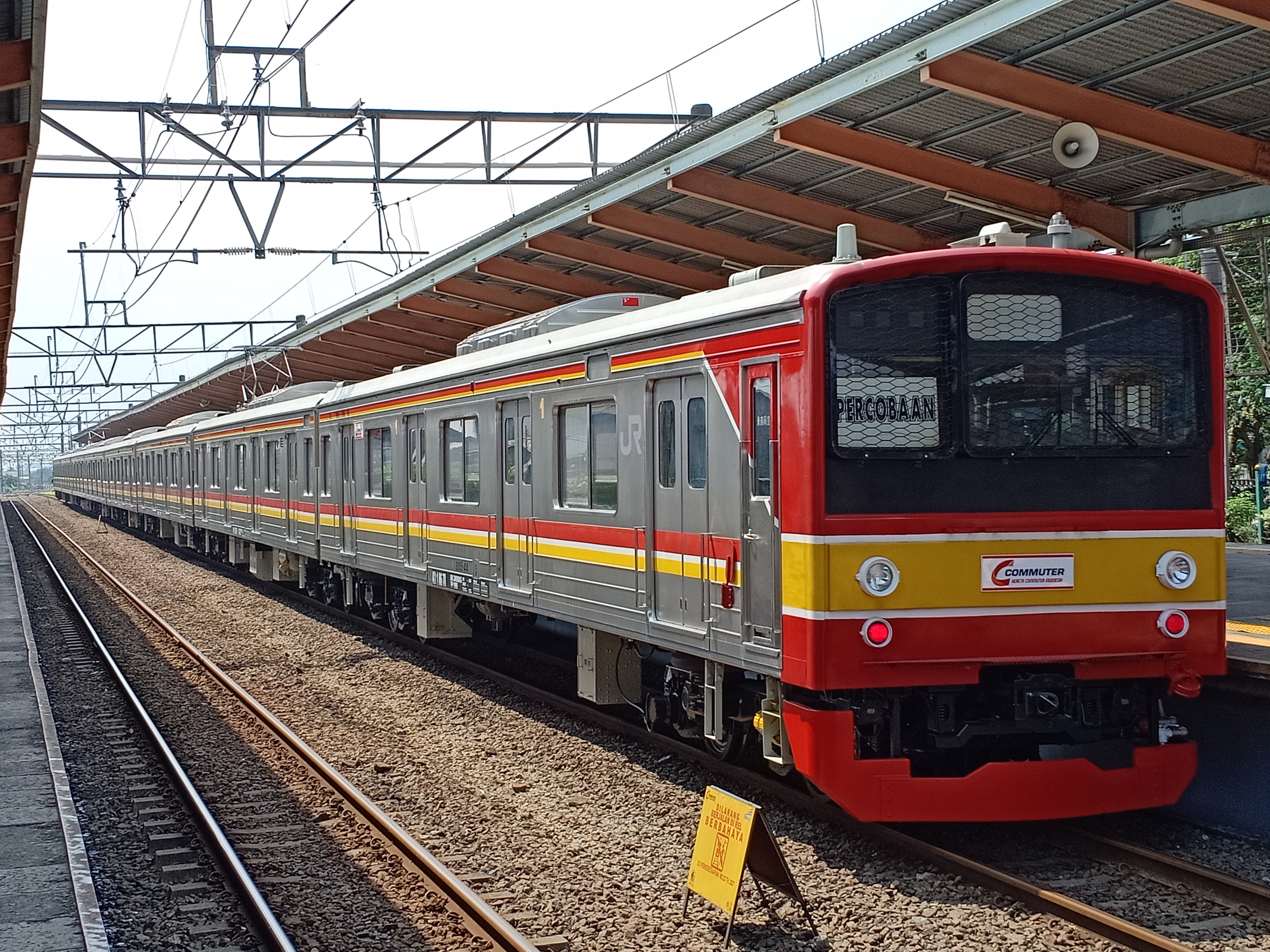
8-car 205 series set 44 (formerly Musashino Line set M3), May 2018.

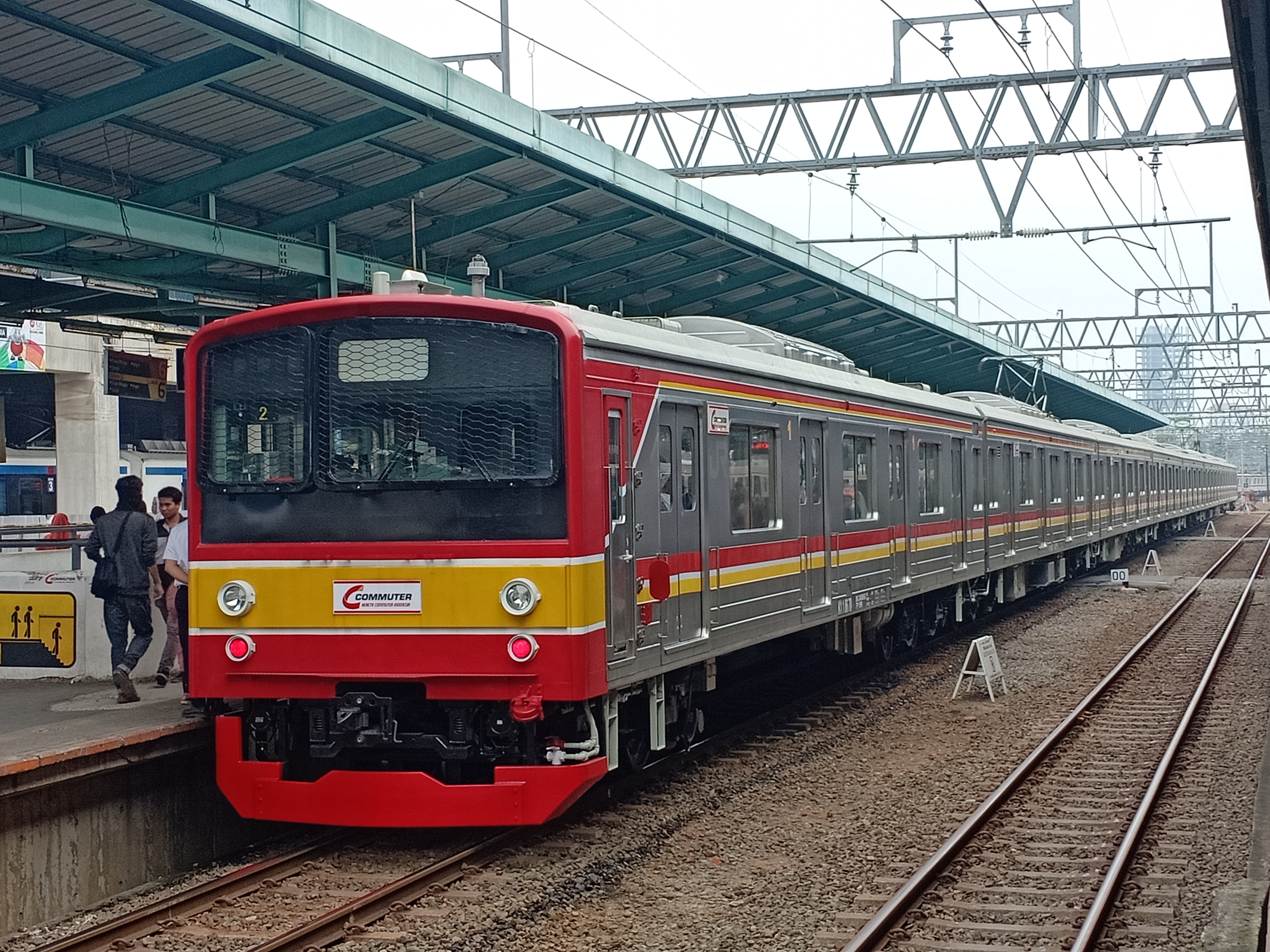
8-car 205 series set 29 (formerly Musashino Line set M15) at Manggarai, June 2018.

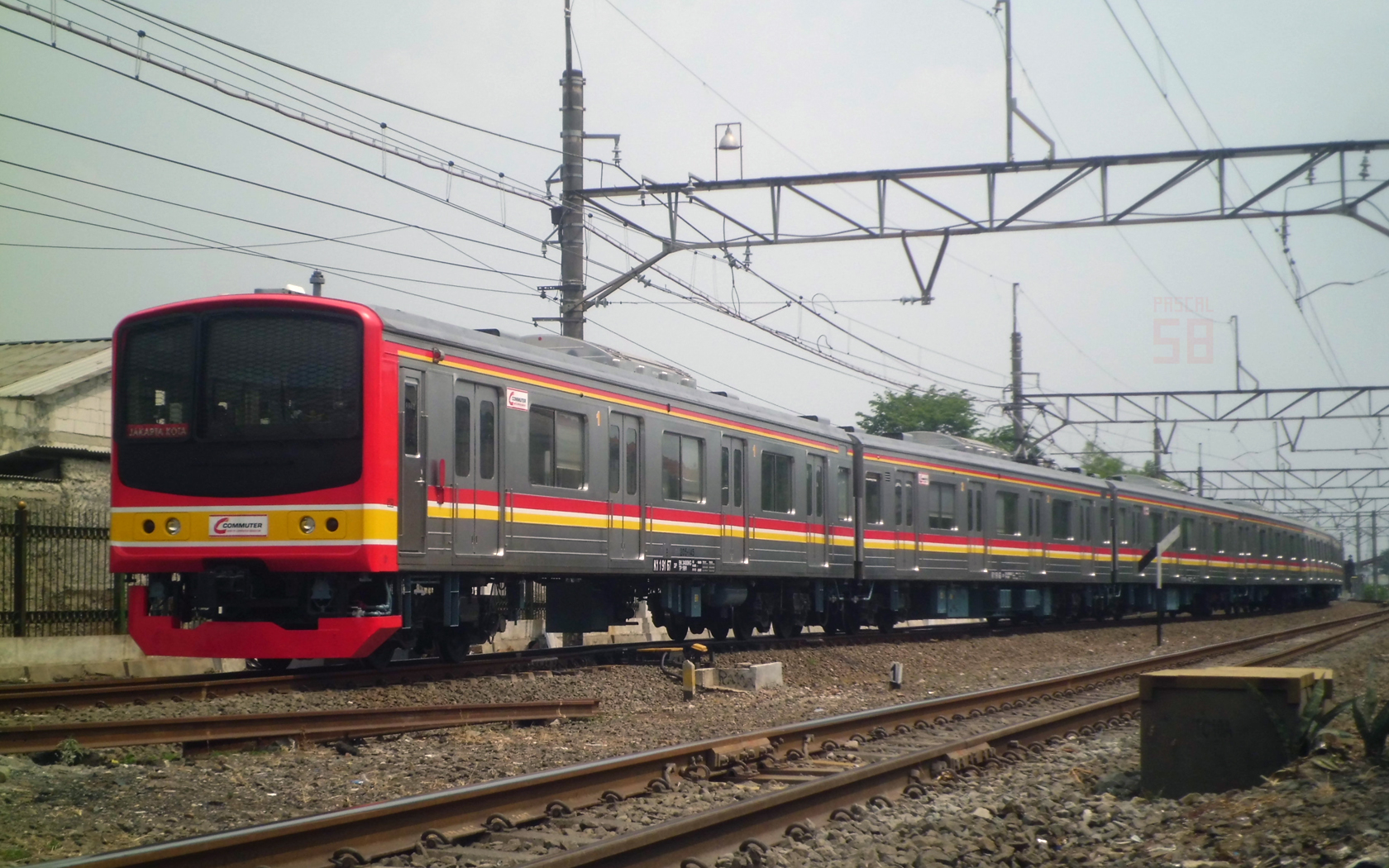
12-car 205 series set 145 (formerly Musashino Line set M35), September 2019.

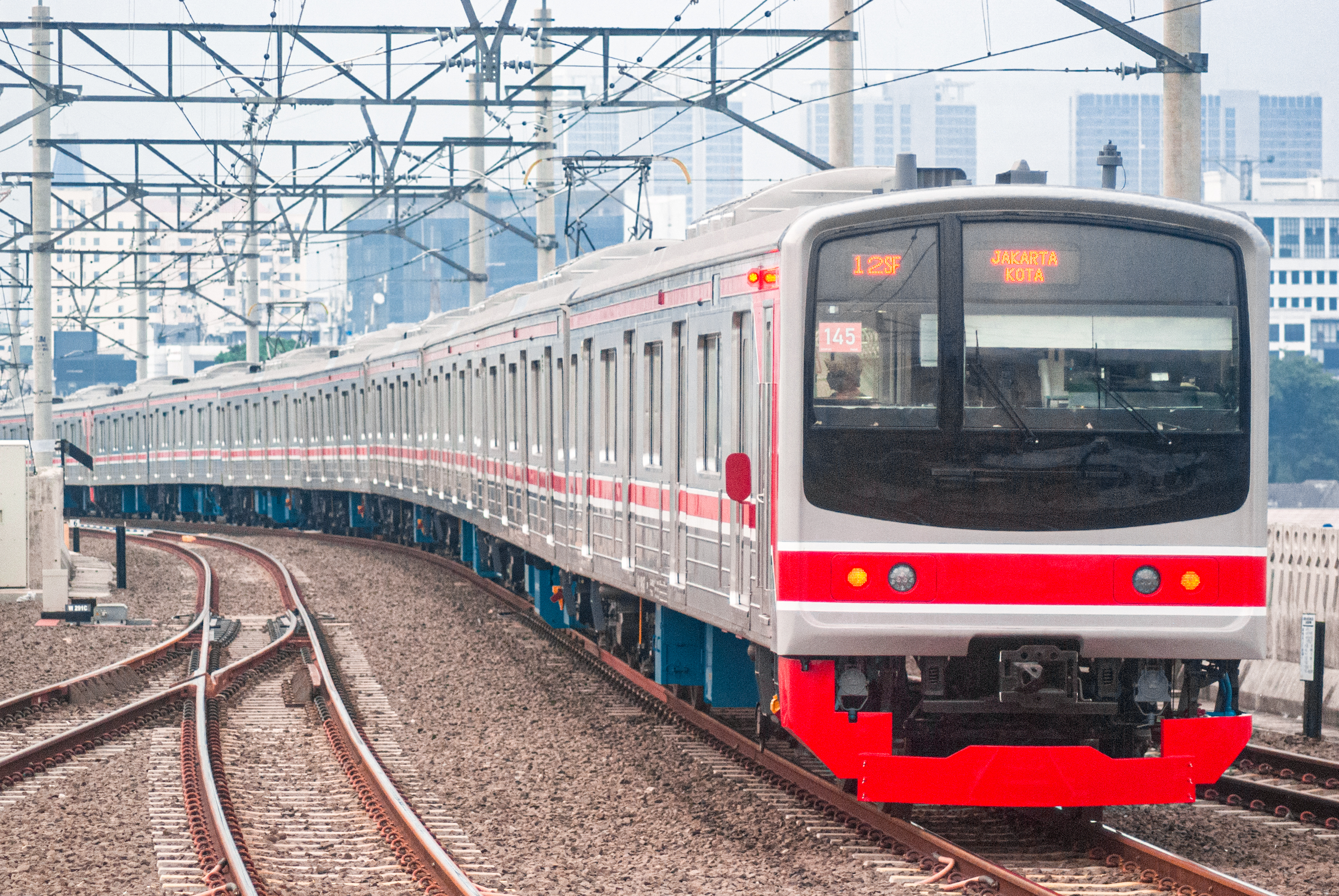
12-car 205 series set 145 (formerly Musashino Line set M35), December 2022.

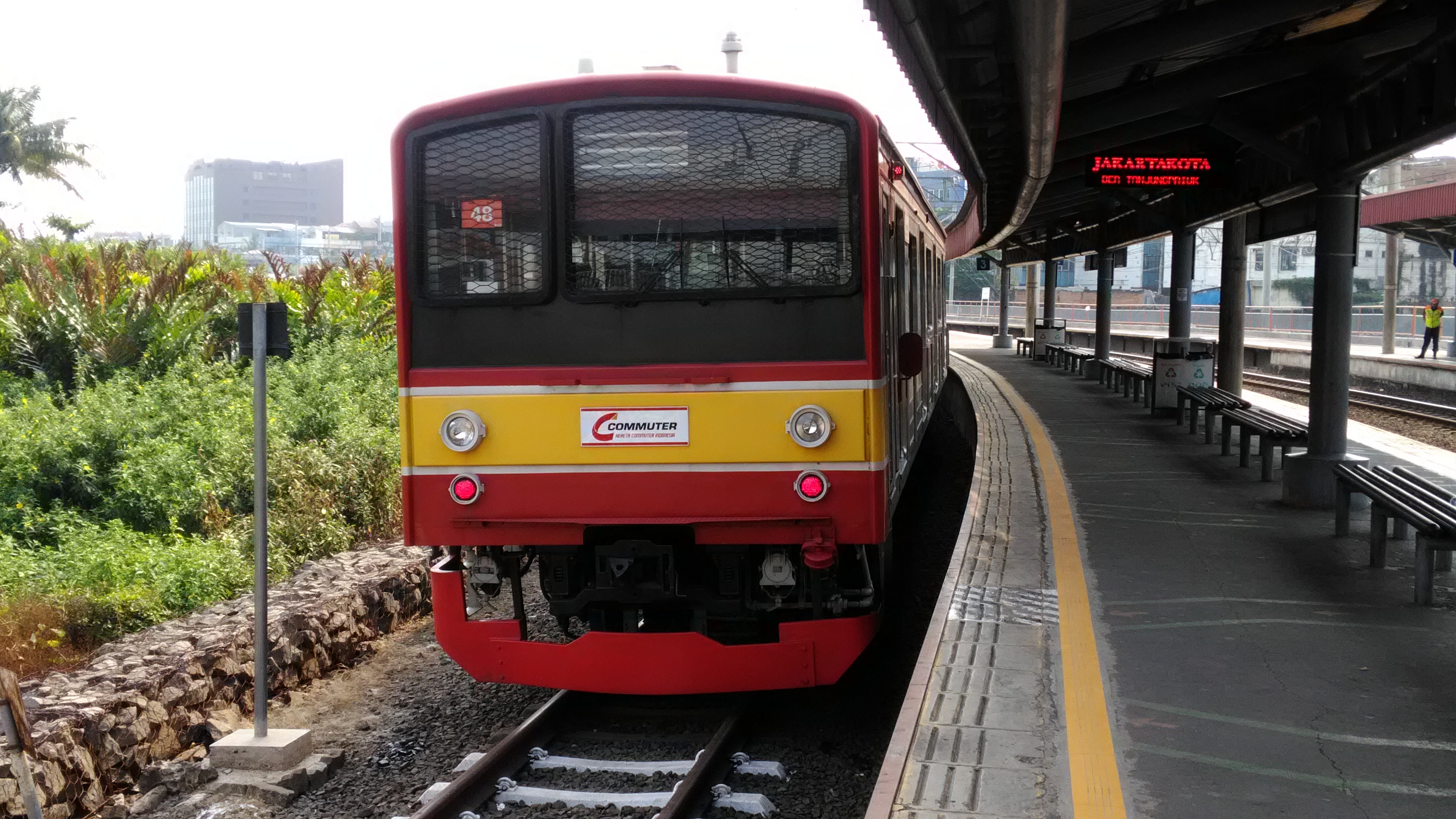
8-car 205 series set 48 (formerly Musashino Line set M7) at Kampung Bandan, October 2019

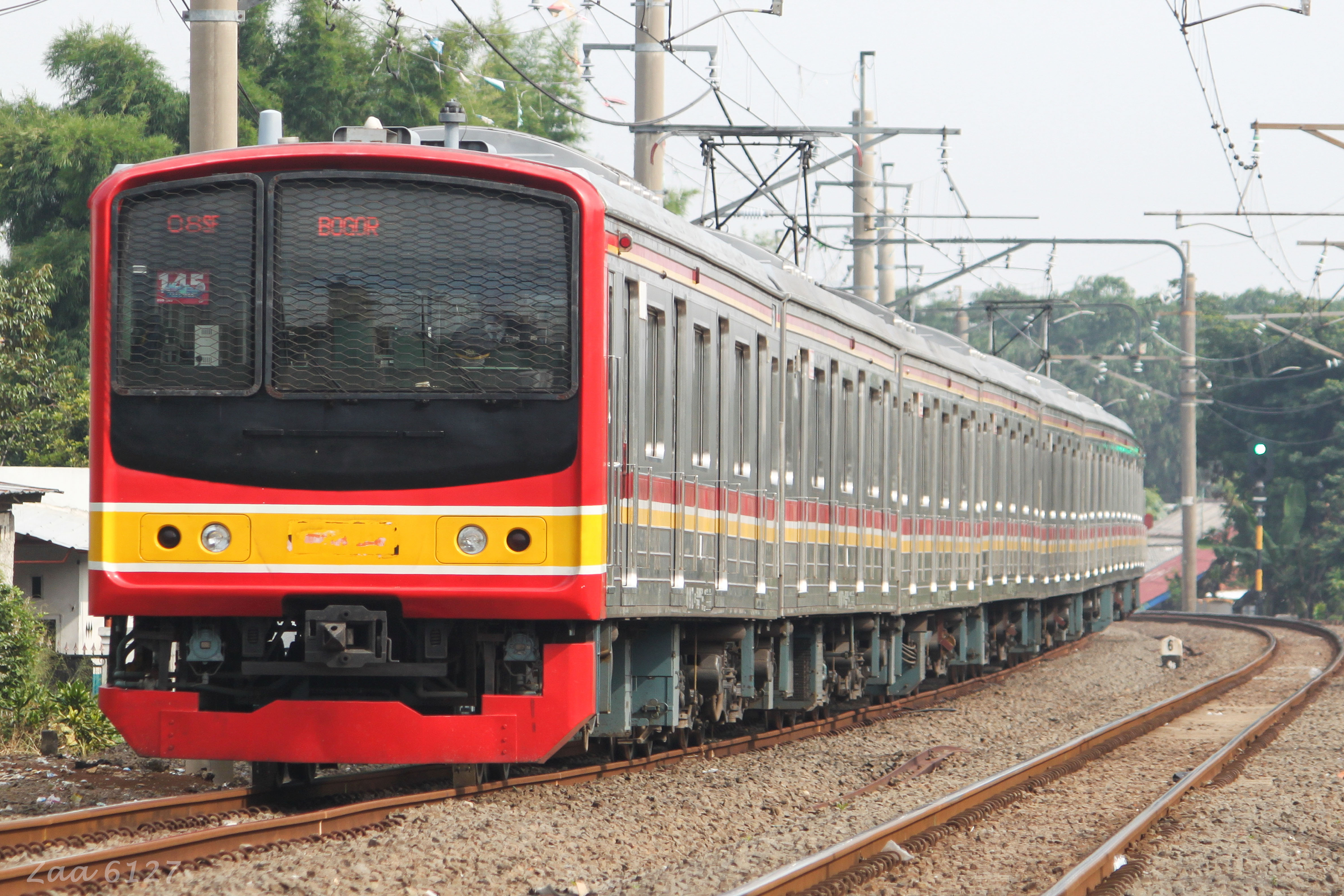
DP 145 carriage crosses the Cilebut area, 2021

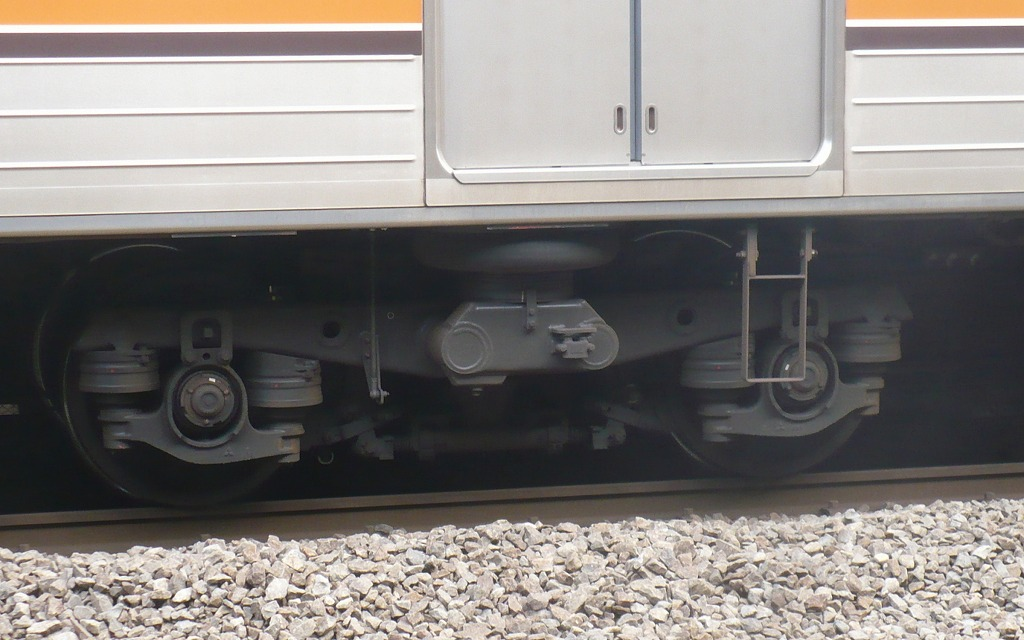
Bogie type DT70 as used on the 205–5000 series

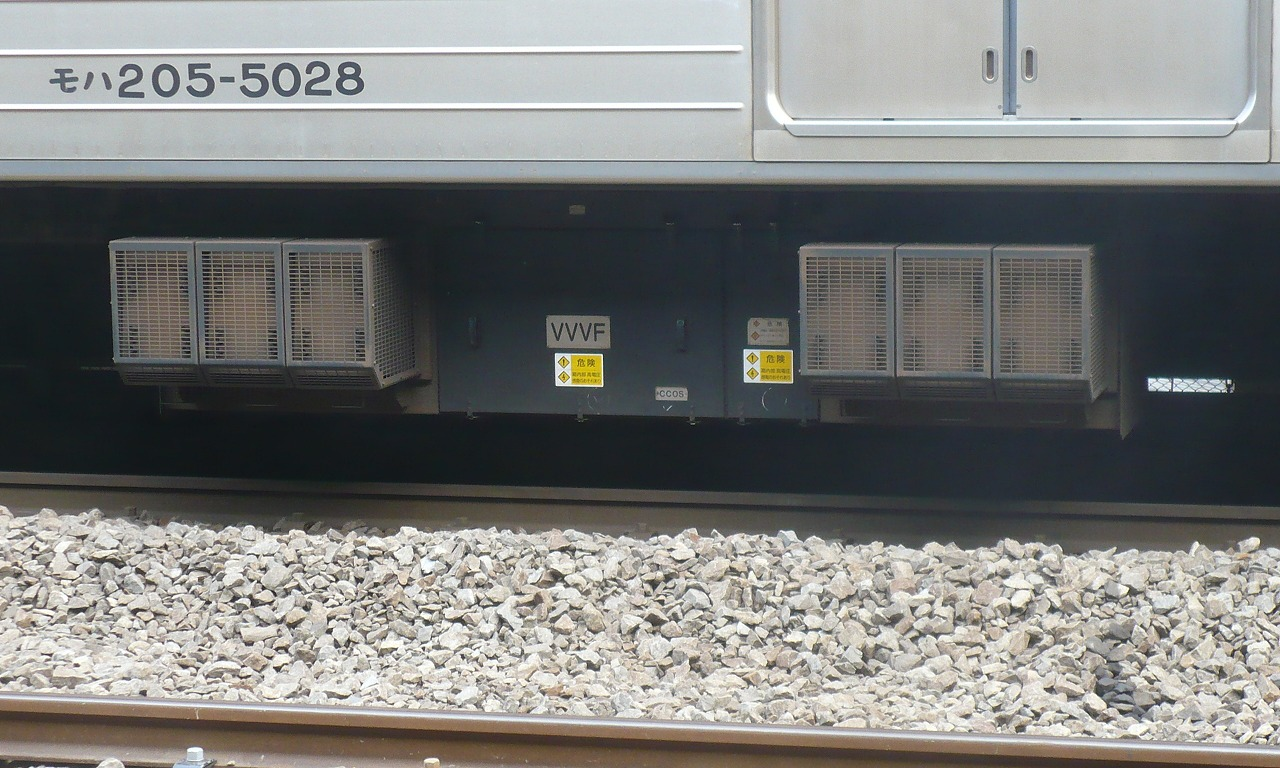
VVVF inverter equipment as used on refurbished unit

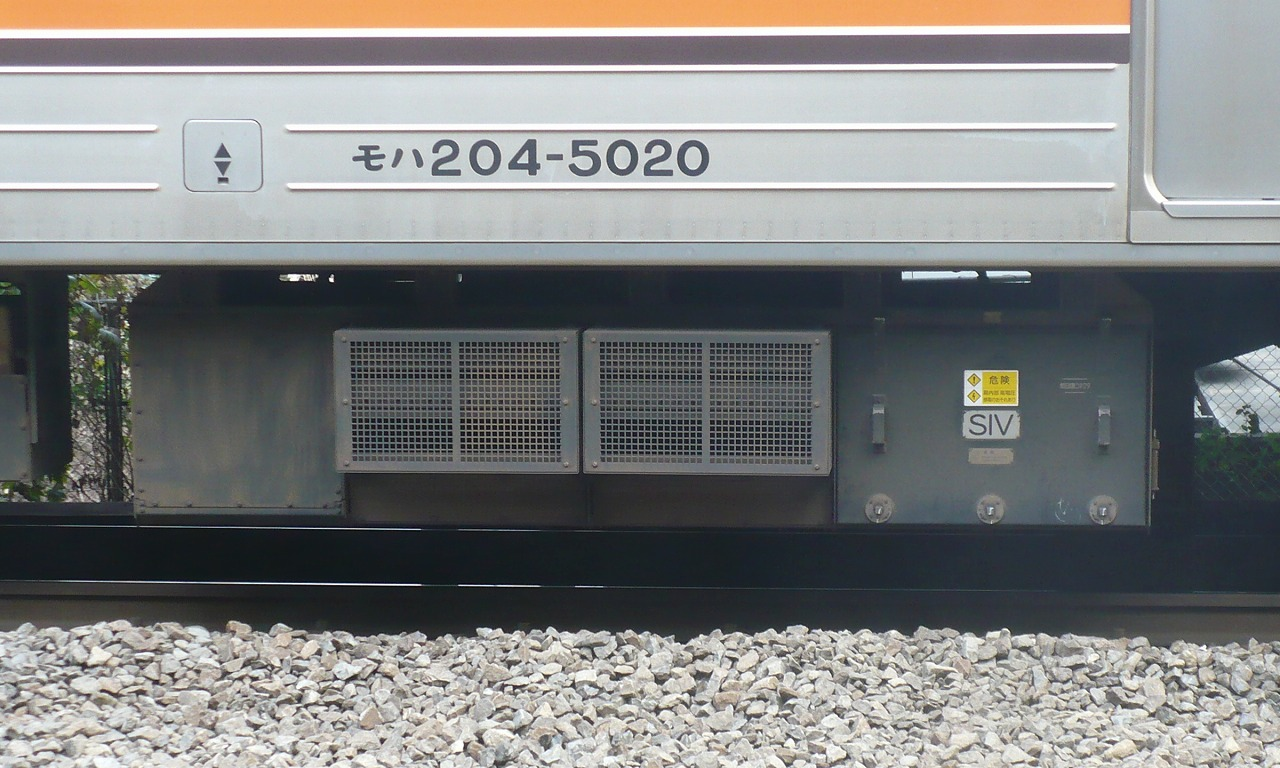
SIV equipment as used on the 205–5000 series

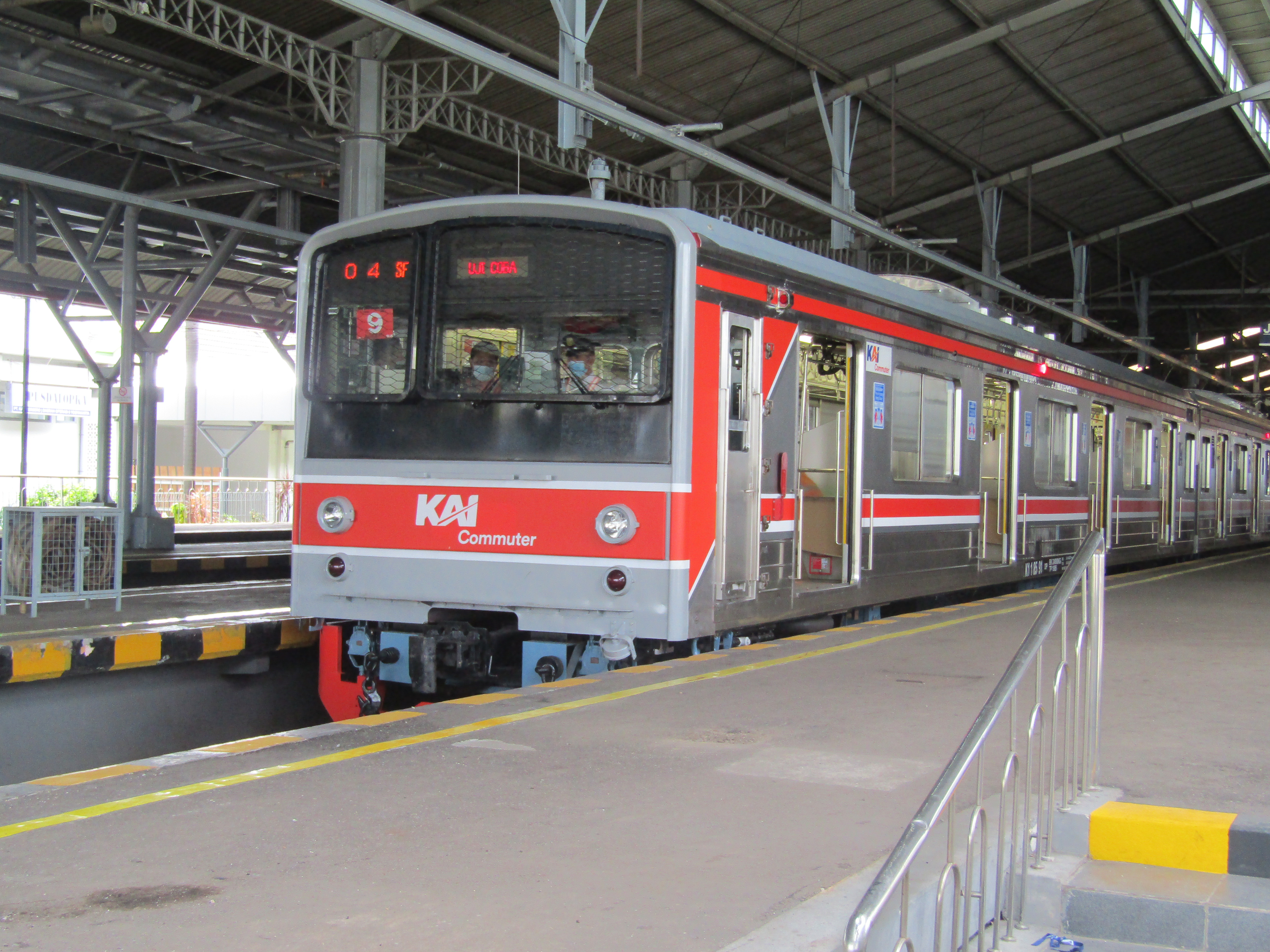
Ex-JR East 205 series Musashino Line EMU set SLO9 (M23) at Tugu Yogyakarta Station, 2020. The following train is now operated in Bogor Line.

Commuter line Yogyakarta with JR 205 46 ex Musashino Line passing at Lempuyangan Station for delivery trainset to Yogyakarta Station

== Withdrawal and resale ==
=== Fuji Kyuko ===
A number of former 205 series trains were sold to Fuji Kyuko in 2011 and modified to become 3-car 6000 series sets, entering service from February 2012. Four more withdrawn JR East 205 series cars (KuHa 205-107 + MoHa 205-287 + MoHa 204-287 + KuHa 204–107) were resold to Fuji Kyuko following withdrawal in November 2016.

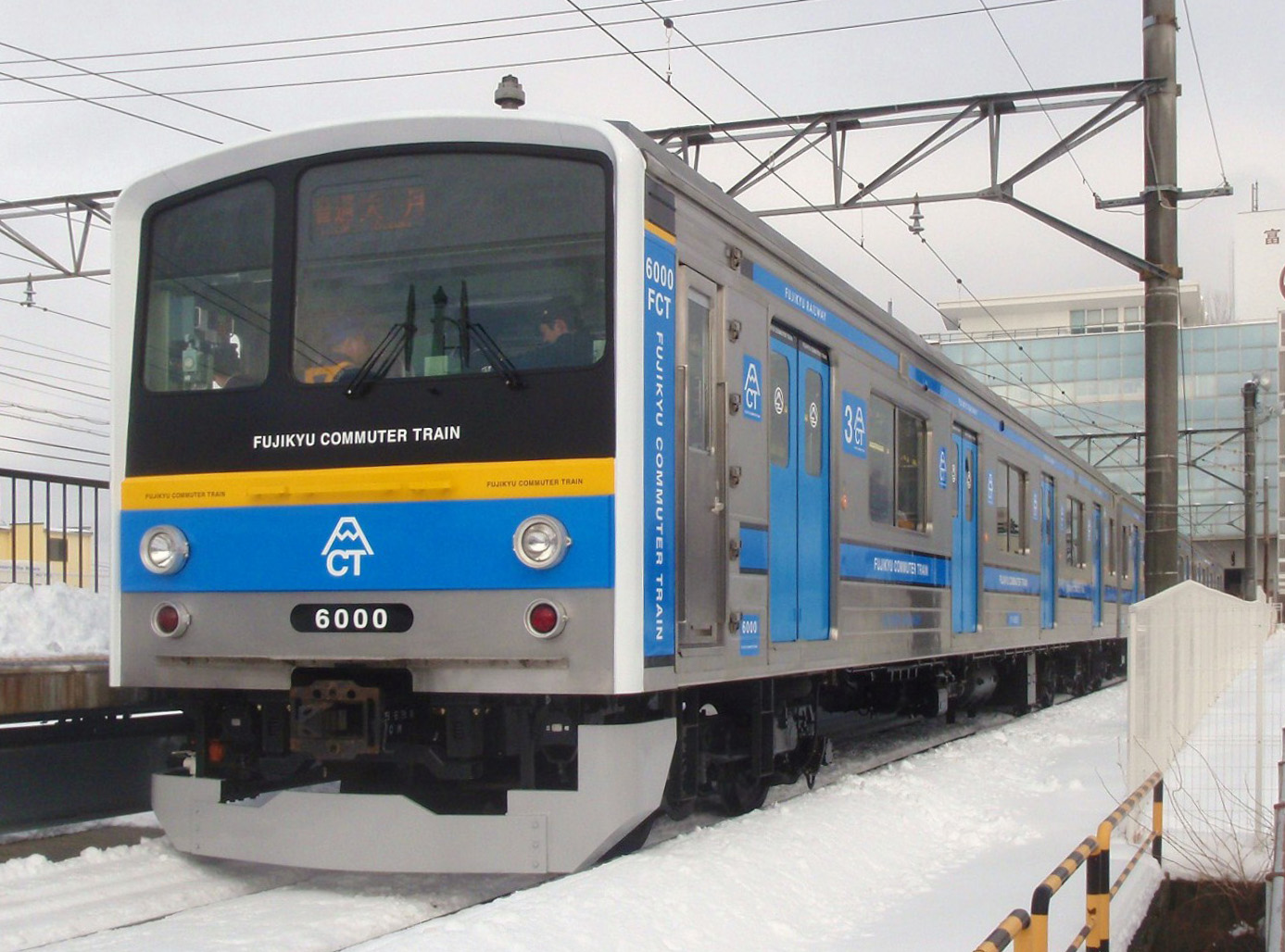
Fujikyu 6000 series in February 2012

=== Indonesia ===
A total of 812 vehicles (102 sets) from withdrawn Saikyo Line, Yokohama Line, Nambu Line, and Musashino Line sets were exported to Kereta Commuter Indonesia in Jakarta between late 2013 up to October 2020. In Japan, the 205 series which were imported to Indonesia operates in the formation of 6, 8, or 10 trains. However, in Indonesia, the 205 series is rearranged so that it can be operated with a formation of 10 or 12 trains, so that only the series from the Saikyo line still uses its original formation when operating in Japan, while the series formations from the Yokohama, Nambu and Musashino lines are almost entirely is already no longer original.

==== Former Saikyo Line/Kawagoe Line/Rinkai Line sets ====
A total of 18 withdrawn Saikyo Line ten-car sets (180 vehicles) were shipped to Kereta Commuter Indonesia (KCI) in Jakarta, Indonesia, in 2013, and entered service from March 2014. The sets in use are former Kawagoe sets 1, 4, 7, 11 to 15, 18, 20, 22 to 26, and 30 to 32. All except sets 26, 30, and 32 include pairs of SaHa 204 cars with six pairs of doors per side. Sets 30 to 32 were originally Yamanote Line sets, distinguished by their smaller door windows. Set 23 was the first set to have a pair of LCD screens inside all cars, except SaHa 204 cars. Set 23 was also the first set to have working LED destination display in KuHa 204 and KuHa 205 cars. Set 15 and 32 were involved in a train accident in Juanda Station, Jakarta.

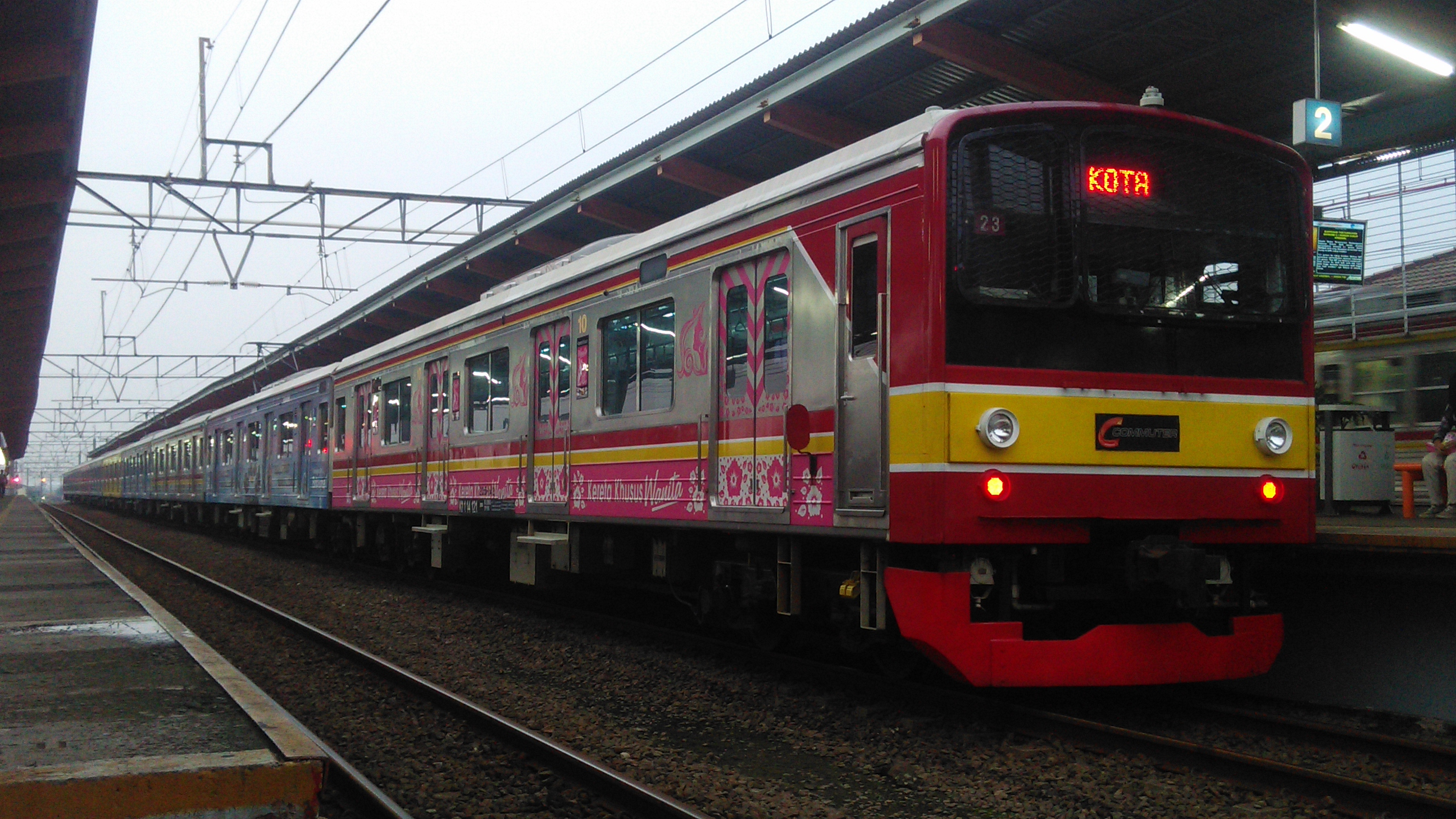
10-car 205 series set BOO 142 (formerly Saikyo Line set HaE 23), June 2016.

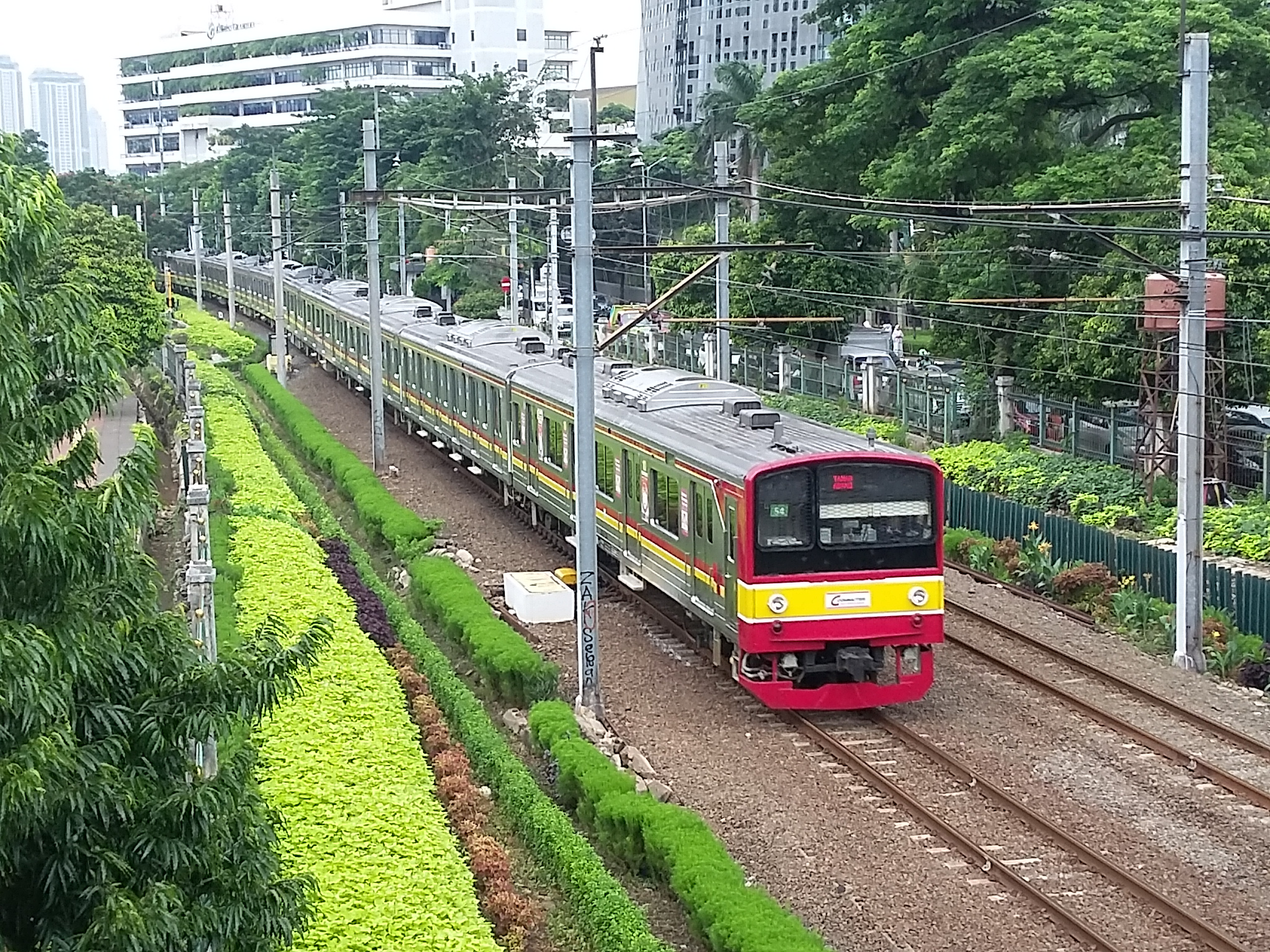
Set BOO123, which is a combination of five cars from former Saikyo Line set HaE 15, three cars from former Saikyo Line set HaE 32, and two cars from former Yokohama Line set KuRa H4, pictured in March 2018.

==== Former Yokohama Line sets ====
From July 2014, 22 withdrawn Yokohama Line eight-car sets, which in use are former trainset numbers 1, 2, 4, 6, 7 to 9; 11 to 15; 17 to 19; 21 to 25; and lastly 27 and 28, with a total of 176 vehicles were shipped to Jakarta and operated as 10-car or 12-car sets.

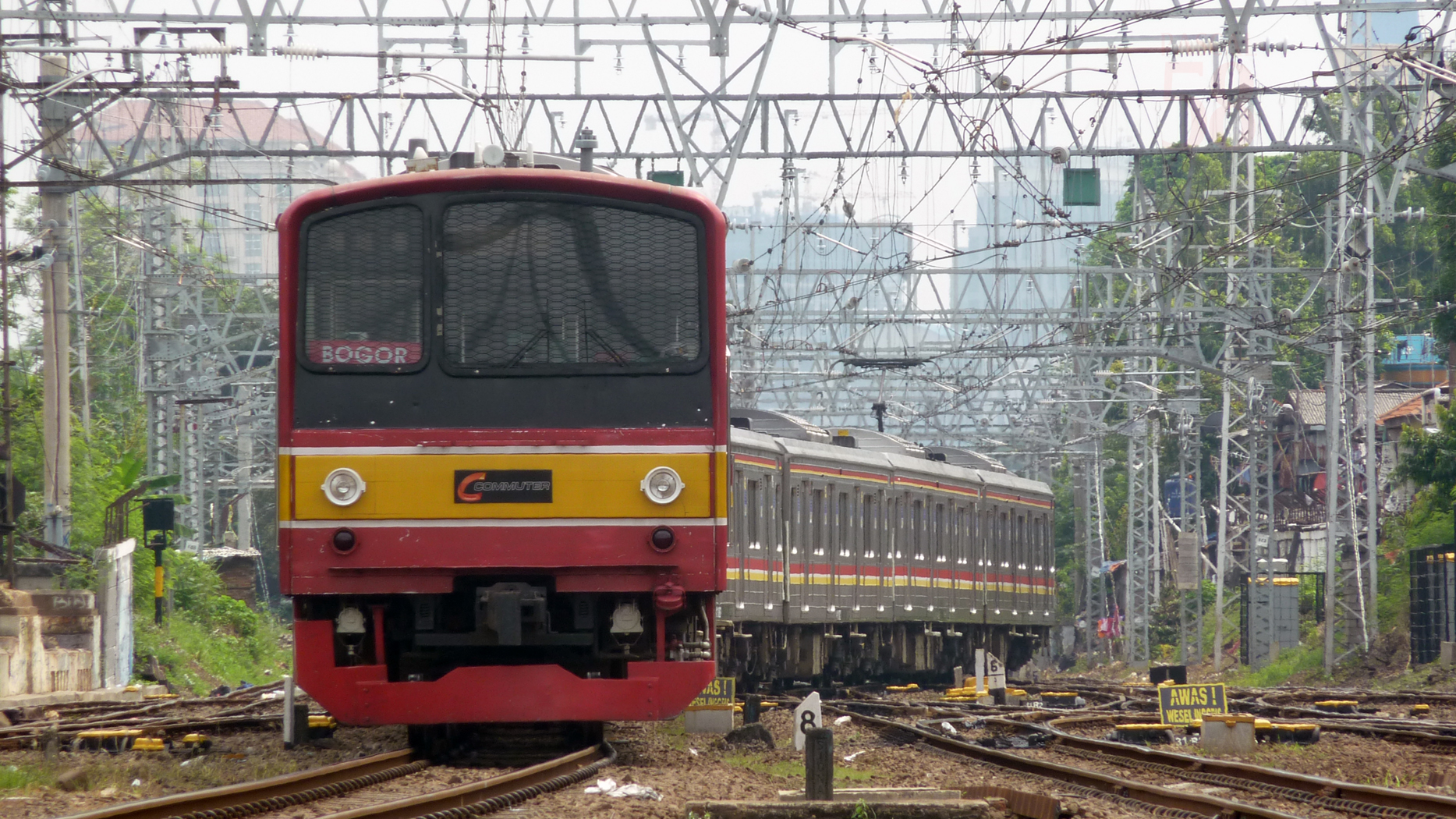
10-car 205 series set 62 (formerly Yokohama Line set H2) in Manggarai Station, July 2016.

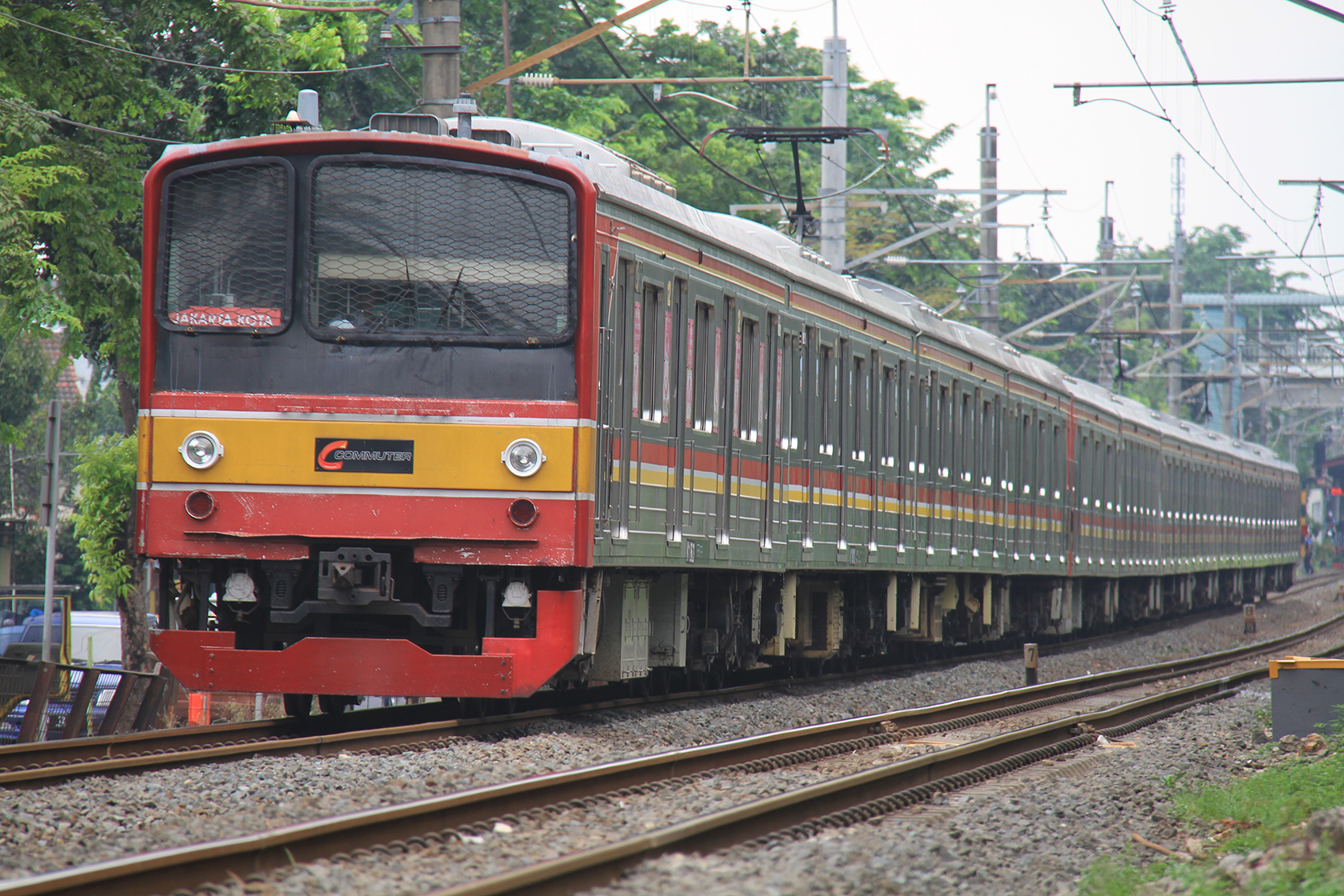
12-car 205 series sets 30 and 74 (formerly Yokohama Line sets H27 and H14), October 2016.

==== Former Nambu Line sets ====
In 2015, 20 withdrawn Nambu Line six-car sets (120 vehicles) were shipped to Jakarta. The former Nambu Line sets are used on 12-car operations.

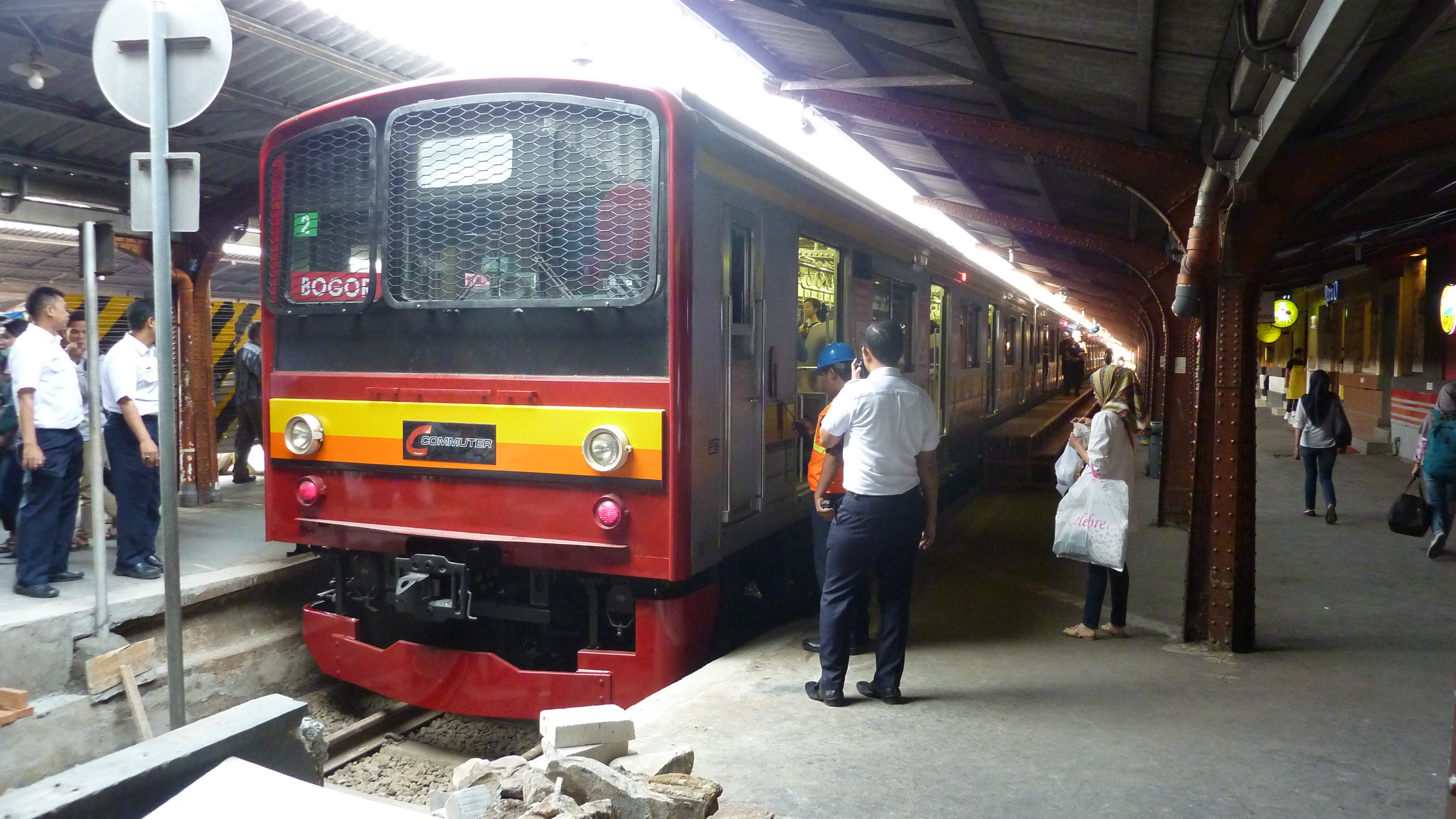
12-car 205 series sets BUD 88 and BUD 86 (formerly Nambu Line set 2 and 4), September 2015.

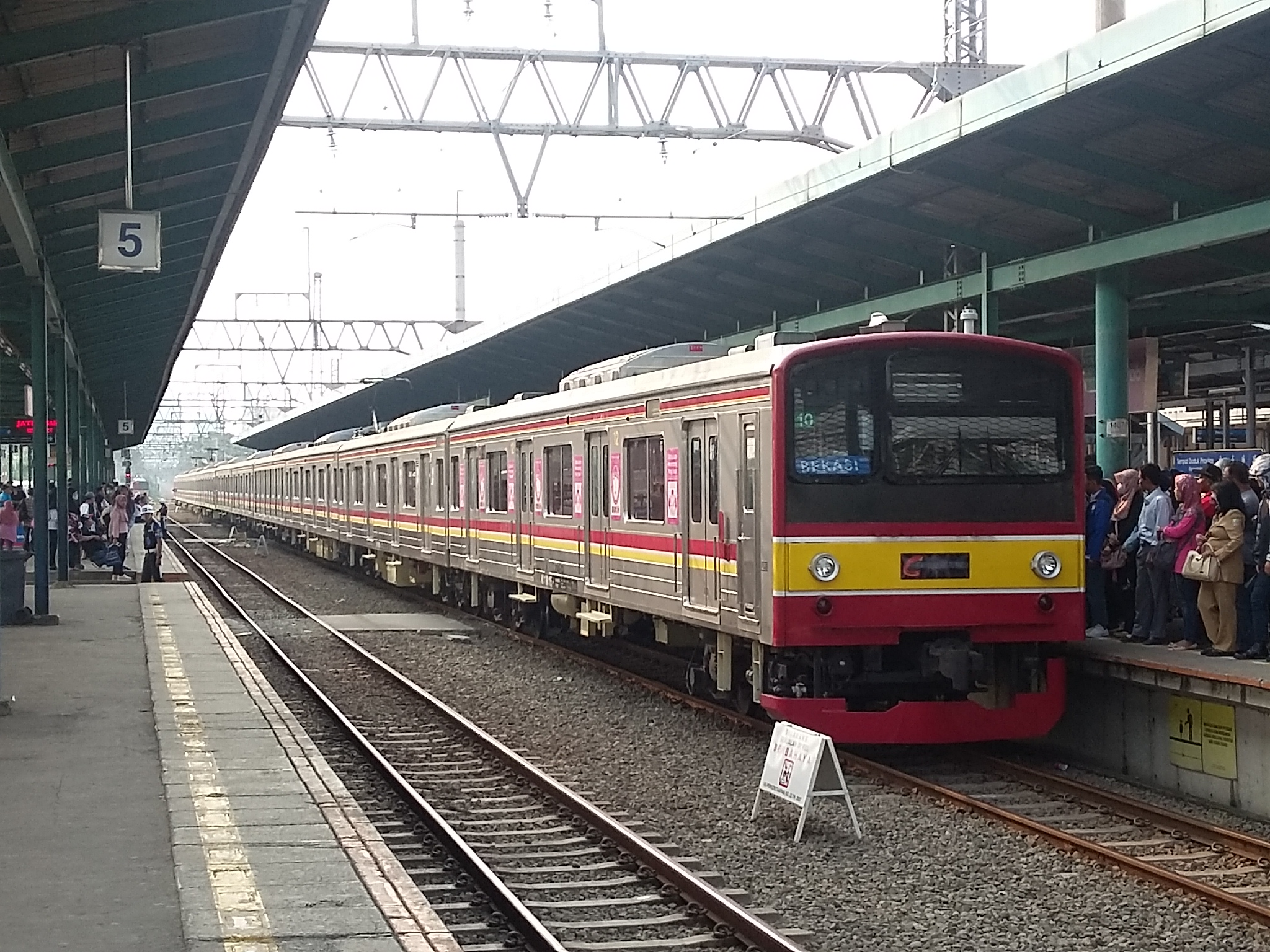
12-car 205 series sets BUD 131 and BUD 134 (formerly Nambu Line set 10 and 13), May 2017.

==== Former Musashino Line sets ====
336 vehicles (36 trainsets for 205–5000 series & 6 trainsets for 205–0 series) withdrawn from the Musashino Line were shipped to Jakarta between March 2018 and December 2020. Sets are operated as 8, 10, and 12-car sets. The initial plan will see rearrangement of all sets into 12-car sets.

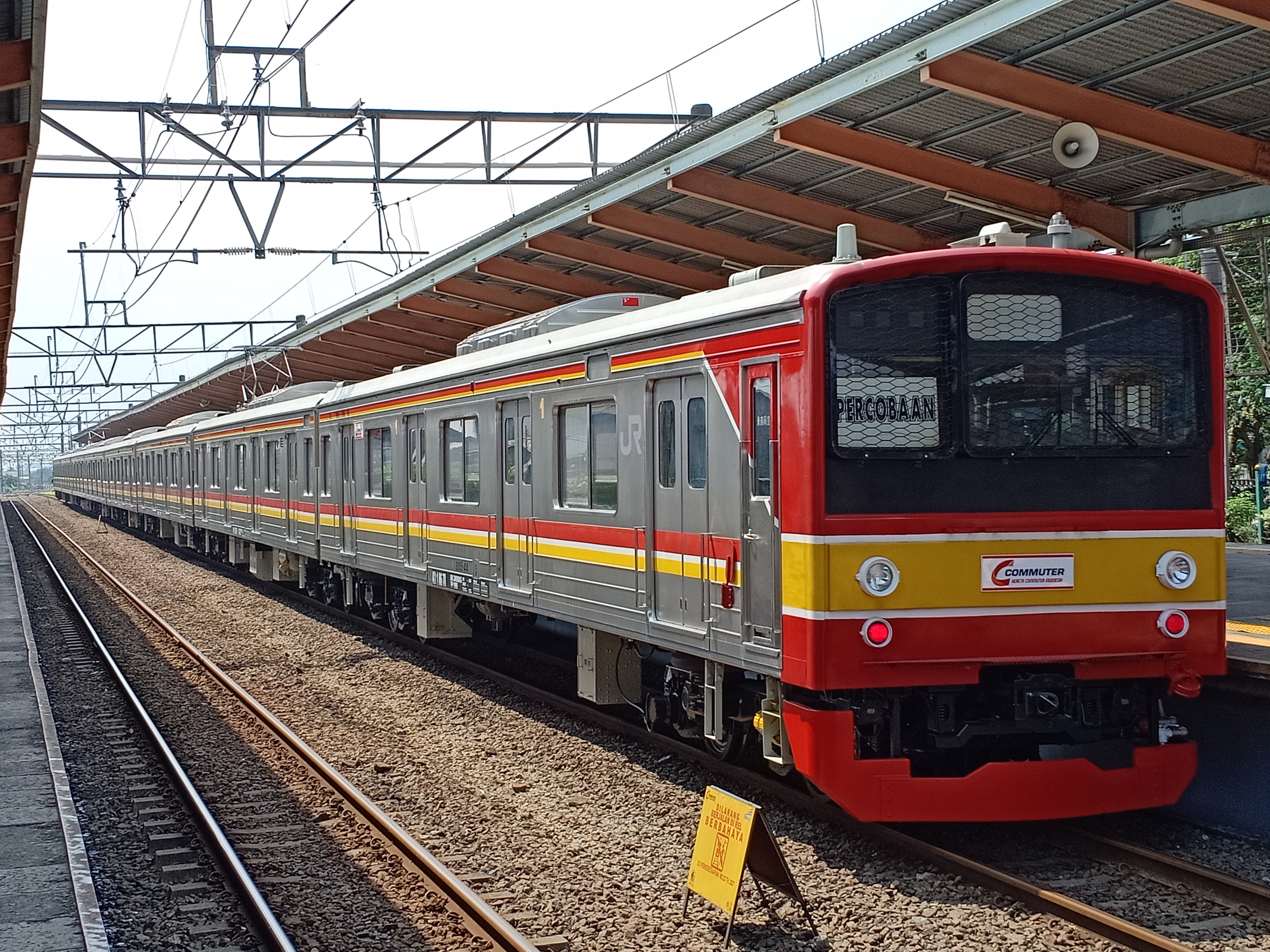
8-car 205 series set 44 (formerly Musashino Line set M3), May 2018.

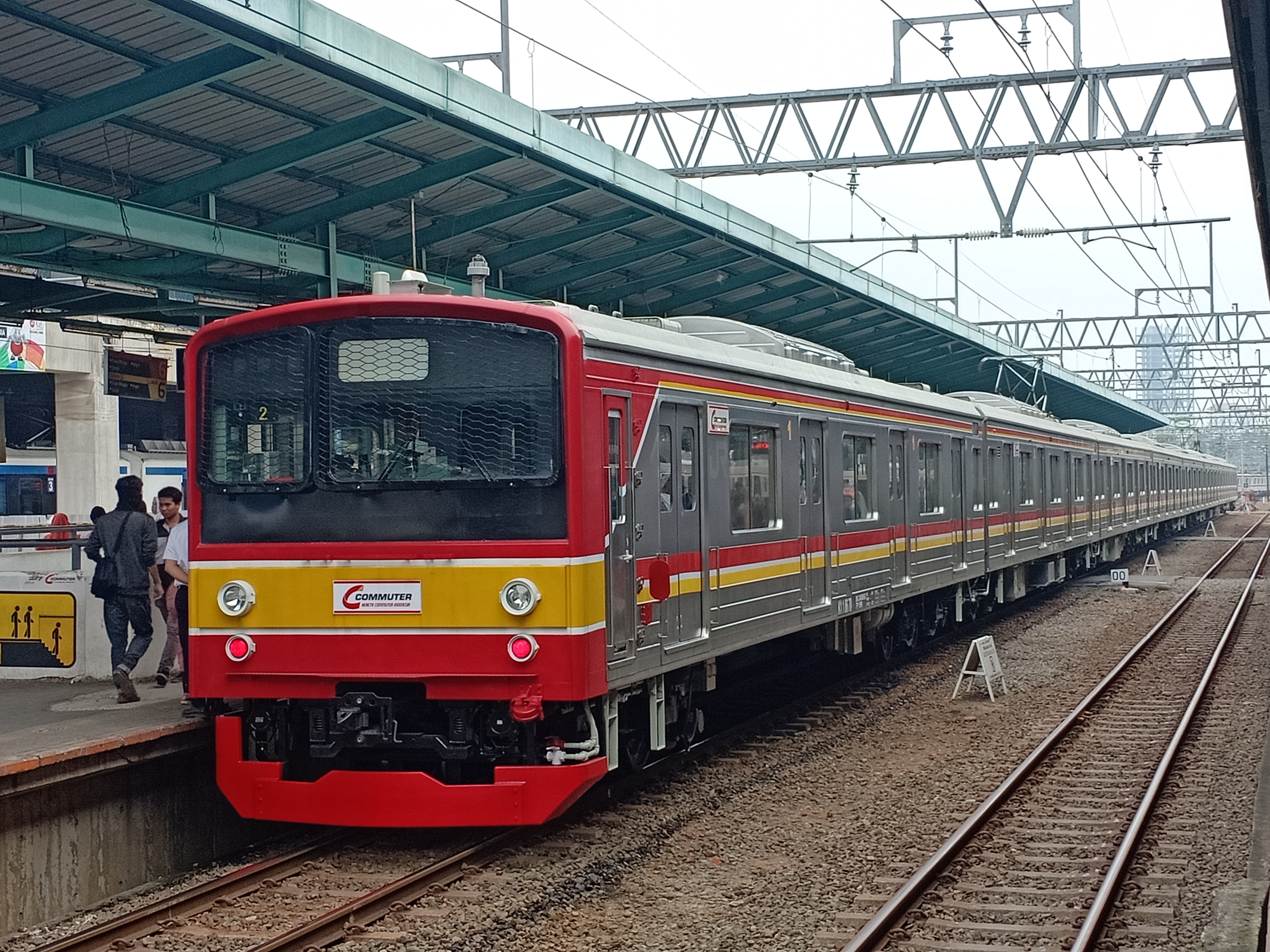
8-car 205 series set 29 (formerly Musashino Line set M15) at Manggarai, June 2018.

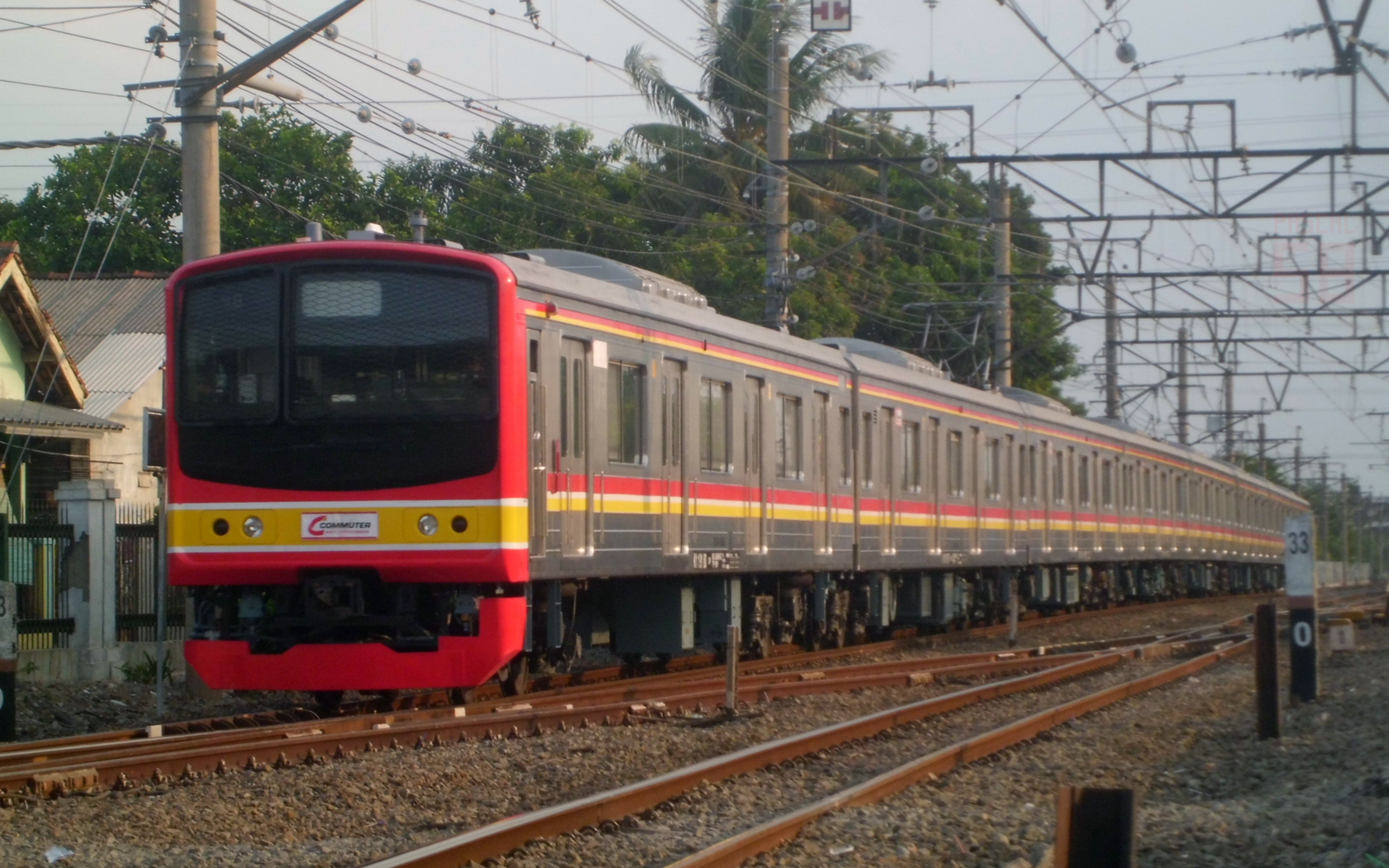
8-car 205 series set 148 (formerly Musashino Line set M64, marchen design), October 2019

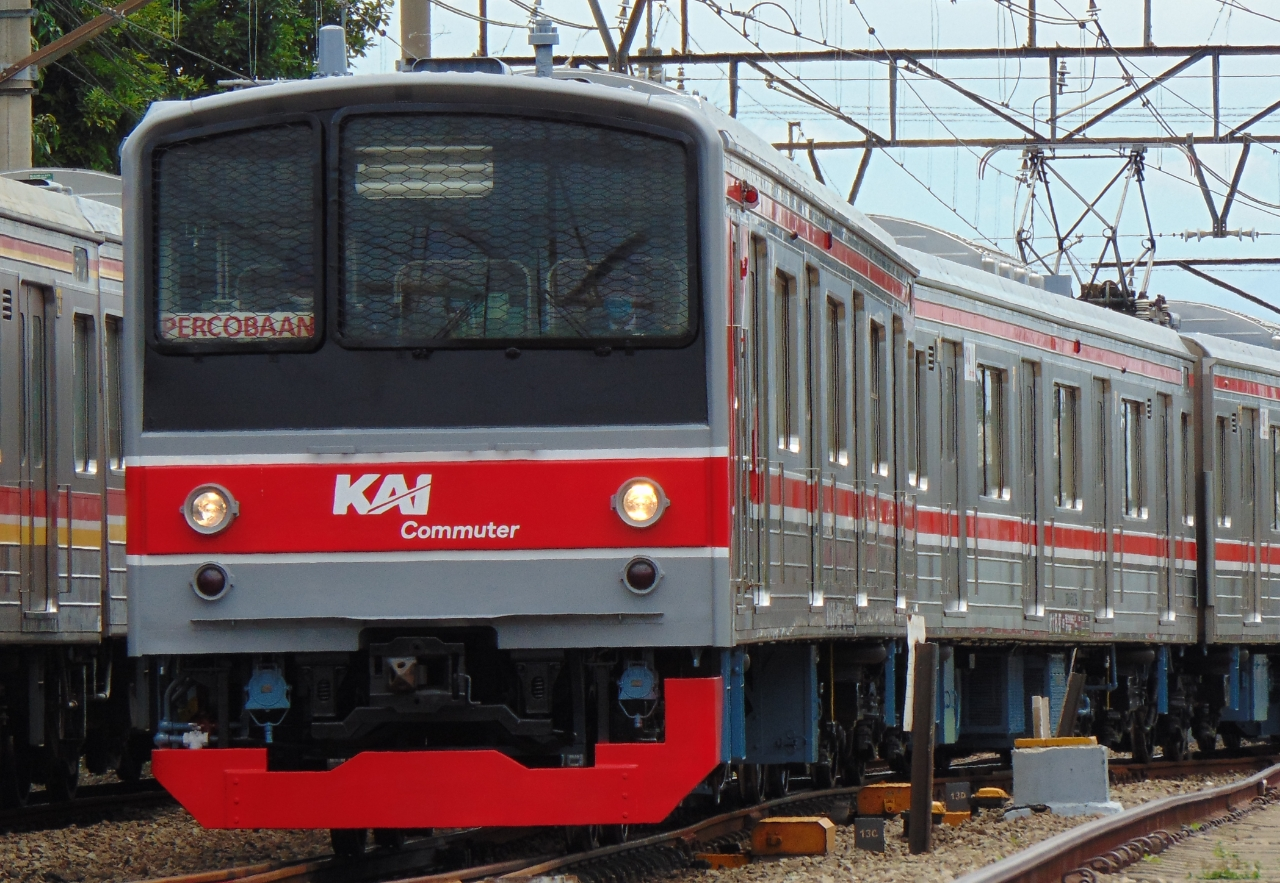
8-car 205-46 With New livery

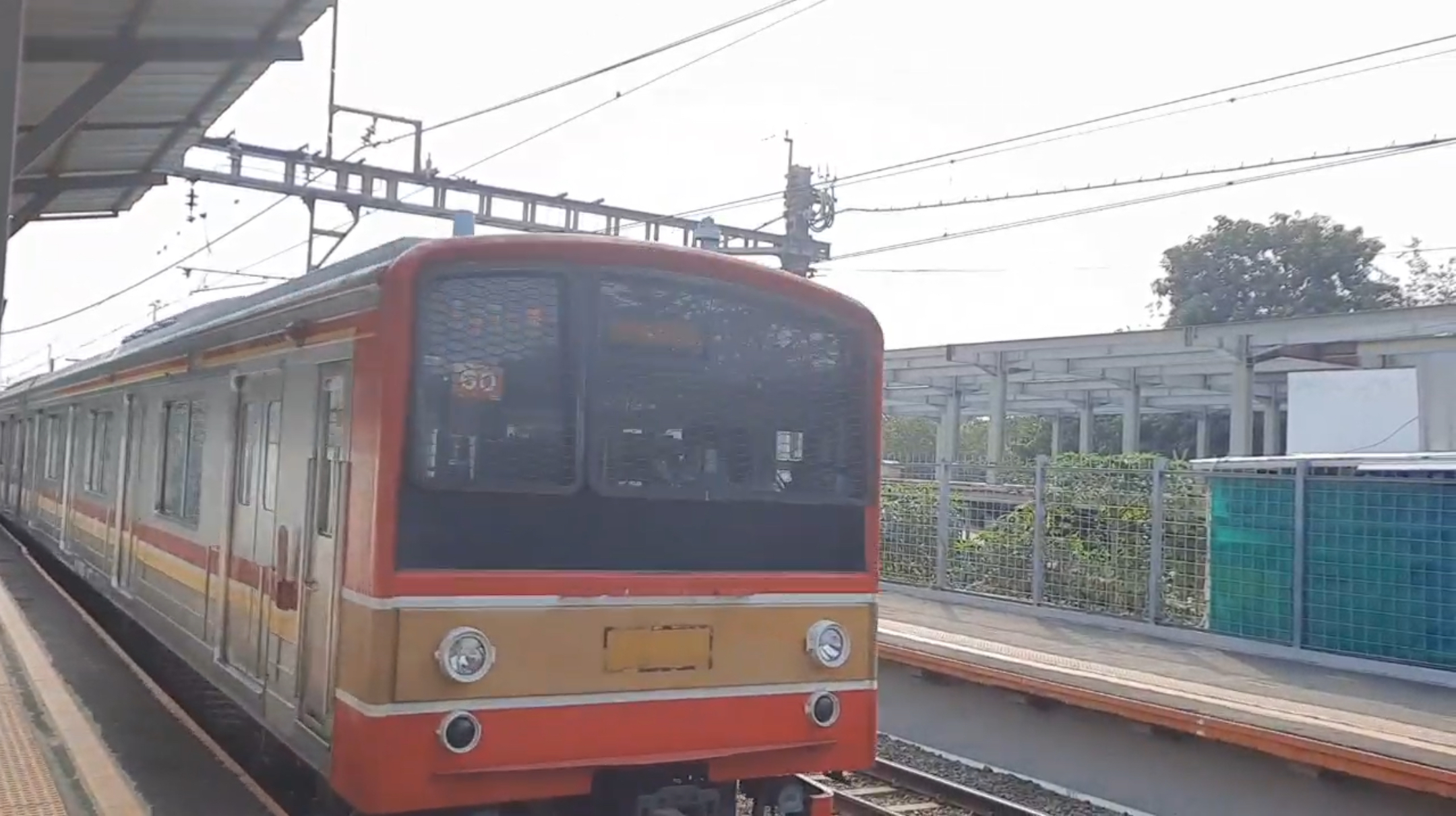
10-car 205 series set 60 (formerly Musashino Line set M21) at Pondok Ranji, October 2021

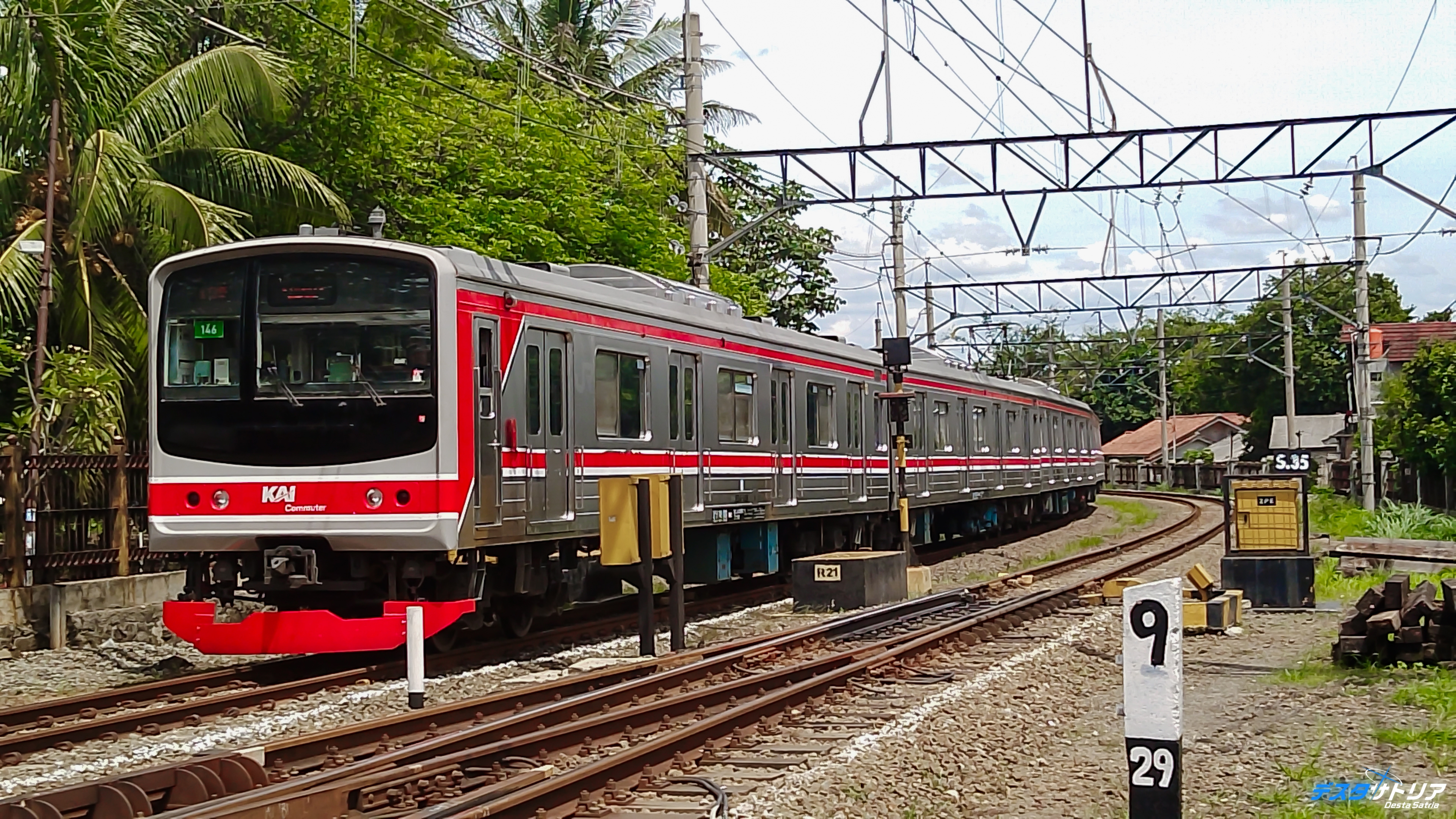
205 series (later design, unofficially called "Marchen face") trainset BUD146 (Formerly trainset KeYo M62) entering Serpong Station.
