= Japanese domestic market =

Japan's home market for vehicles

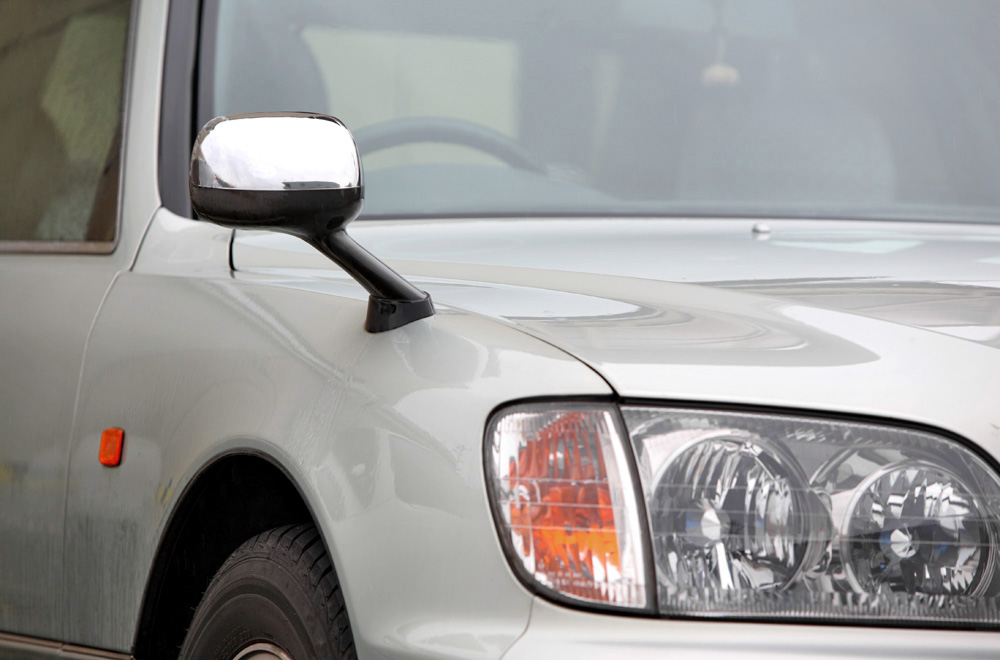
Fender mirror of Toyota Celsior (UCF20 JDM)

The term "Japanese domestic market" ("JDM") refers to Japan's home market for vehicles and vehicle parts. Japanese owners contend with a strict motor vehicle inspection and grey markets. JDM is also incorrectly used as a term colloquially to refer to cars produced in Japan but sold in other countries.

The average age of JDM cars is 8.7 years, ranking 9th in a survey of 30 of the top 50 countries by gross domestic product. According to the Fédération Internationale de l'Automobile, a car in Japan travels a yearly average of over only 9,300 kilometres (5,800 mi), less than half the U.S. average of 19,200 kilometres (11,900 mi).

Japanese domestic market vehicles may differ greatly from the cars that Japanese manufacturers build for export and vehicles derived from the same platforms built in other countries. The Japanese car owner looks more toward innovation than long-term ownership which forces Japanese carmakers to refine new technologies and designs first in domestic vehicles. For instance, the 2003 Honda Inspire featured the first application of Honda's Variable Cylinder Management. However, the 2003 Honda Accord V6, which was the same basic vehicle, primarily intended for the North American market, did not feature VCM, which had a poor reputation after Cadillac's attempt in the 1980s with the V8-6-4 engine. VCM was successfully introduced to the Accord V6 in its redesign for 2008.

In 1988, JDM cars were limited by voluntary self-restraints among manufacturers to 280 PS (276 hp; 206 kW) and a top speed of 180 km/h (112 mph), limits imposed by the Japan Automobile Manufacturers Association (JAMA) for safety. The horsepower limit was lifted in 2004 but the speed limit of 180 km/h (112 mph) remains.

== Motorcycle power and speed restrictions ==
For many years Japan had severe restrictions on the maximum power and speed that motorcycles could have.

All motorcycles for the Japanese domestic market were restricted to 180 km/h (112 mph).

Power restrictions were as follows:

=== Pre-1993 ===
- 250cc class: 45 hp (46 PS; 34 kW)
- 400cc class: 60 hp (61 PS; 45 kW)
- 750cc class: 77 hp (78 PS; 57 kW)
- over 750cc: not allowed

=== Post-1993 ===
- 250cc class: 40 hp (41 PS; 30 kW)
- 400cc class: 53 hp (54 PS; 40 kW)
- 750cc class: 77 hp (78 PS; 57 kW)
- over 750cc: allowed, but restricted to 100 hp (101 PS; 75 kW)

== VIN ==
Japanese carmakers do not use a vehicle identification number as is common overseas. Instead, they use either a frame number, chassis number, or vehicle ID number and also a model code as well as an emissions code to identify their vehicles. The frame number identifies the vehicles model and serial number. For example, frame number SV30-0169266 breaks down as "SV30" identifying the model as Toyota Camry/Vista and "0169266" being the serial number of the vehicle. The model code designates the vehicle's model number and features. As an example, ST205-BLMVZ breaks down as "ST205", which means it is a third generation Toyota Celica GT-FOUR, and "BLMVZ" which designates a set of features incorporated in the vehicle. The Emissions Code refers to the vehicle's designated emission standard at the time, usually being placed before the vehicle's model number, and with the five most commonly used designations being E, GF, GH, ABA, and CBA. These codes are only seen on JDM models and are not present on exported models of the same type. Examples would include E-EK9 or GF-EK9 from the first generation Civic Type R, E-BNR32 from the R32 Skyline GT-R, E-JZX100 from the eighth generation Mark II. Another useful example to help differentiate between pure JDM models and export examples is the code JHMEEG6 on the European Civic VTi models and E-EG6 on the Japanese fifth generation Civic SiR trims. Correct identification of the chassis code using these markers would help prove the authenticity of the model.

== Worldwide popularity ==
=== Motorcycles ===
In the '90s the JDM power restrictions along with license restrictions that made it difficult to be licensed on larger motorcycles resulted in a number of models that were not offered anywhere else in the world, with 250cc and 400cc miniature replicas of the bigger 750cc & 900cc bikes.

At the same time, Japan had particularly tough laws regarding road licensing and sales regulations. Any motorcycle more powerful than 250cc had to take an extensively stringent test every two years.

Combining these factors with a nearly non-existent second-hand market made it economic to export the nearly new bikes abroad, where they were bought by a number of import specialists who sprung up to cater for this "grey import" market of relatively inexpensive motorcycles.

In the later '90s as Japan's economy fell into recession it became less profitable to export and Japanese owners held on to their bikes for longer. The last global crash all but ended the "grey import" industry with the big specialist importers closing down.

=== Cars ===
Cars manufactured for the Japanese domestic market have been growing in popularity since the late 1990s.

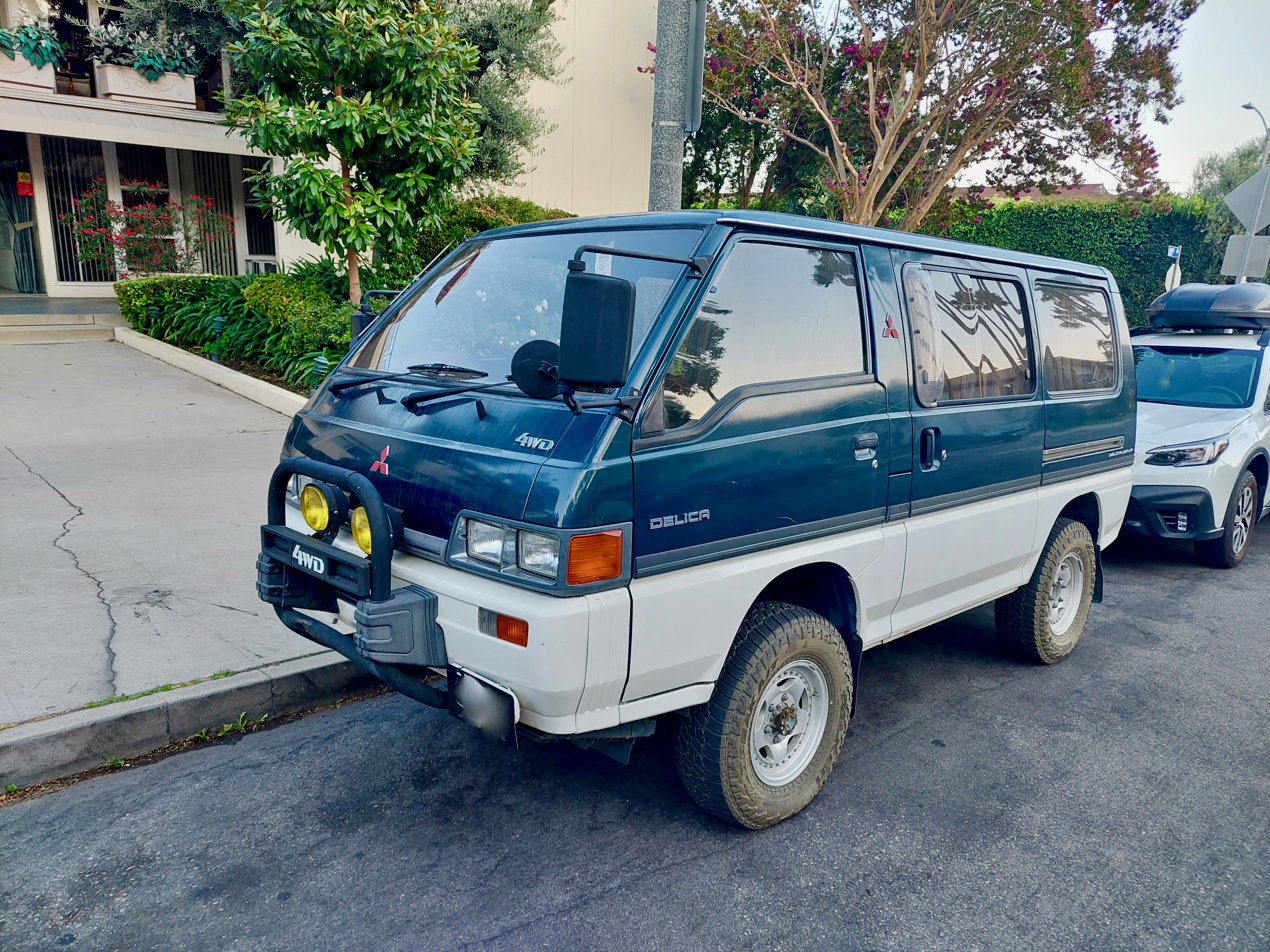
1990 Mitsubishi Delica Star Wagon 2.5l Turbo Diesel 4WD - JDM US Grey import vehicle

Ex-Japan Imports are also very common in New Zealand where 59% of vehicles registered on New Zealand roads originated from overseas markets as opposed to 41% of which were delivered NZ-New. Of this, 94% originate from Japan. New Zealand imported an average of 134,834 JDM vehicles per year in the period 2015–2019, the majority of which were Mazda 3 (Axela), Suzuki Swift, Nissan Tiida, Toyota Corolla and Mazda 2 (Demio). Other models popular for importation in previous years include exotic vehicles (Honda Torneo, Nissan Skyline, Nissan Laurel and Toyota Altezza), and kei cars (Suzuki Carry, Daihatsu Move, Subaru R2). Due to the popularity of used imports from Japan, and their relatively poor crash-test ratings, the New Zealand Ministry of Transport is currently investigating tougher restrictions on imported vehicles, most notably on the importation of the Toyota Corolla, Mazda 2 (Demio) and Suzuki Swift.

In 2004, importing JDM cars became popular in Canada as highly sought after vehicles, such as the 1989 Nissan Skyline GT-R, became eligible to import under Canada's 15-year rule. In contrast, importing grey market vehicles into the United States is much more difficult. To avoid regulatory problems, most private individuals wait until EPA restrictions no longer apply to the desired vehicle, which is done on a rolling 25-year cycle.

=== Railways ===
Ex-Japan import rolling stocks in all kinds is no exception on this list, although it can be considered as JDM but in special case since this was also intended for Japanese market which were mostly acquired by leading private railway companies across Japan such as Japan Railways, even subways such as Tokyo Metro, Tokyu Corporation, Toei Subway and so forth which was in demand for modernizing railway system in most developing countries such as Indonesia, Thailand, and Myanmar to acquire used trains from Japan rather than procuring brand-new rolling stocks, there are some cases that the management from each respective railway companies in Japan such as Japan Railways are decided to donate them to the oversea country, instead of scrapping them ahead in no time, which is really needed for a major upgrade and sign their agreement that the recipient of the oversea country will pay for its freight expenses and the rest will be free. Here are different categories of used rolling stocks listed which were mostly shipped and operated overseas in different countries.

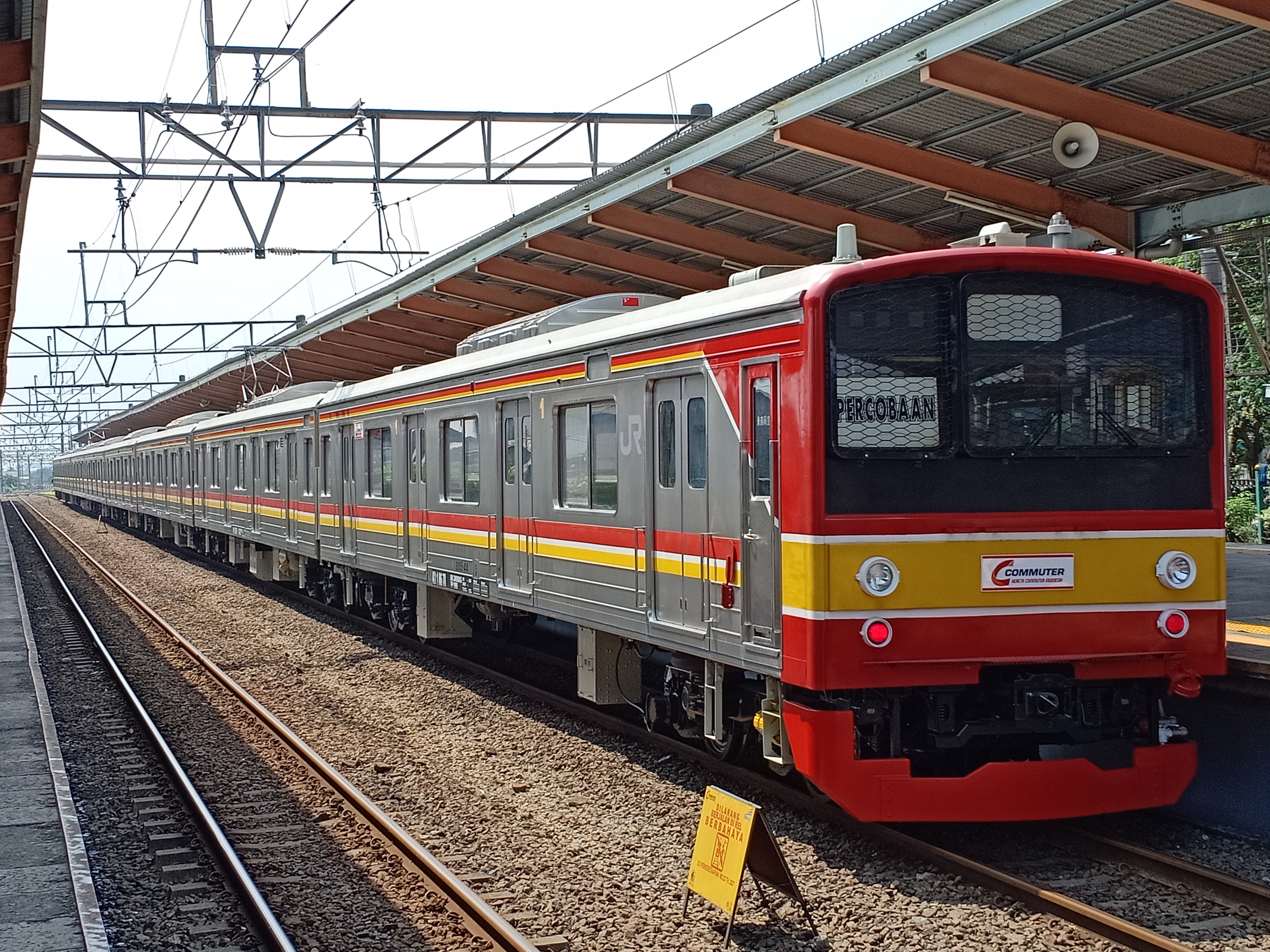
8-car 205 series set 44 (formerly JR East Musashino Line set M3, also formerly operated in Yamanote Line from 1986 to 2003), May 2018

- Electric Multiple Unit

Rolling Stock	Former Operator	Years of service in Japan	Former Railway Line in Japan	Current Operator	Country in Overseas	Year of Service	Remarks
103 series	JNR / JR East	1980–2005	Musashino Line	KRL Jabodetabek	Indonesia	2004–2016	103–0 series still active in JR West as of 2023
203 series	JNR / JR East	1982–2011	Chiyoda Line, Joban Line	KAI Commuter	Indonesia	2011–present	The last batch of Japanese EMU rolling stock to be donated from Japan in 2010-2011 aside from donation to the Philippines
203 series	JNR / JR East	1982–2011		Philippine National Railways	Philippines	2012–present	Served as push-pull passenger cars hauled by a diesel-electric locomotive
205 series, 205–5000 series	JNR / JR East	1985–2020	Saikyo Line, Yokohama Line, Nambu Line, Musashino Line, Yamanote Line (before remodeling into 205–5000 series to be transferred to Musashino Line by 2002–2008)	KAI Commuter	Indonesia	2013–present	Over 100 sets in total were shipped to Indonesia from 2013 to 2020, making it the most number of units ever shipped overseas.
Nagoya Municipal Subway 5000 series	Nagoya Municipal Subway	1980–2015	Higashiyama Line	Buenos Aires Underground	Argentina	2015–present	
Eidan 500 series	Eidan (now becomes Tokyo Metro in 2004)	1954–1996	Marunouchi Line	Buenos Aires Underground	Argentina	1996–present	No specific info since there are other variations such as 300, 400 & 900 series which belong to the 500 series classification
Toei 6000 series	Toei Subway	1969–1999	Mita Line	KRL Jabodetabek	Indonesia	2000–2016	It was their first Japanese EMU rolling stock to be donated from Japan in 2000
Tokyo Metro 5000 series	Eidan / Tokyo Metro	1964–2007	Tokyo Metro Tozai Line	KRL Commuter Indonesia	Indonesia	2007–2020	
Tokyo Metro 6000 series	Eidan / Tokyo Metro	1971–2018	Chiyoda Line, Joban Line	KAI Commuter	Indonesia	2011–present	
Tokyo Metro 7000 series	Eidan / Tokyo Metro	1974–2022	Fukutoshin Line, Yurakucho Line	KAI Commuter	Indonesia	2010–present	
Tokyo Metro 02 series	Eidan / Tokyo Metro	1988–present	Tokyo Metro Marunouchi Line	None	Philippines	None	2 units of Preserved railcars for educational training purposes for Railway Engineering programs currently offered by FEATI University in Manila, Philippines
Tokyo Metro 05 series	Eidan / Tokyo Metro	1988–present	Tokyo Metro Tozai Line	KAI Commuter	Indonesia	2011–present	
Tokyu 8000 series	Tokyu Corporation	1969–2008	Various	KAI Commuter	Indonesia	2005–present	Still active in Izukyu Railway in Japan
Tokyu 8500 series	Tokyu Corporation	1975–2023	Various	KAI Commuter	Indonesia	2006–present	Still active in other private railway companies in Japan
Toyo Rapid 1000 series	Toyo Rapid Railway	1995–2007	Tokyo Metro Tozai Line, Tōyō Rapid Railway Line	KRL Commuter Indonesia	Indonesia	2007–2019	Remodeled from Tokyo Metro 5000 series in 1995

- Diesel Multiple Unit

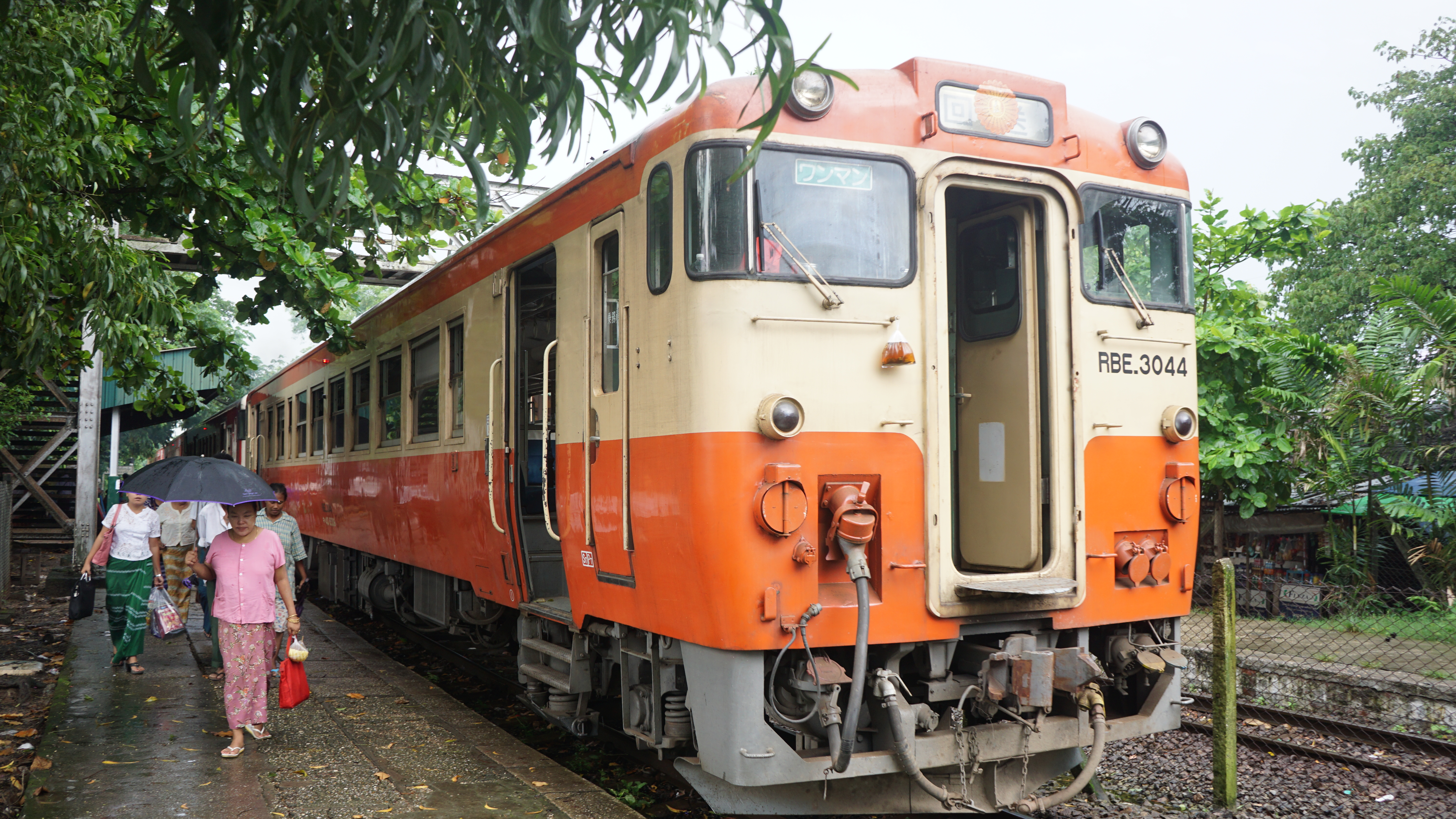
A former JR Central KiHa 40 series train in Myanmar in July 2016

Rolling Stock	Former Operator	Years of service in Japan	Former Railway Line in Japan	Current Operator	Country in Overseas	Year of Service	Remarks
KiHa 11	JR Central	1989–present	Various lines in JR	Myanmar Railways	Myanmar	2015–present	Myanmar Railway's latest used rolling stock from Japan based on manufacturing year
KiHa 35	JNR / JR, Kanto Railway	1961–2012 (JR), 1986–2010 (Kanto Railway)	Various lines in JR, Joso Line	Philippine National Railways	Philippines	2015–present	Served as push-pull passenger cars hauled by a diesel-electric locomotive
KiHa 38	JNR / JR	1986–2012 (JR)	Kururi Line	Myanmar Railways	Myanmar	2014–present	Remodeled from aging KiHa 35 railcars by JNR in 1986
KiHa 40	JNR / JR	1977–present	Various lines in JR	Myanmar Railways	Myanmar	2016–present	
KiHa 52	JNR / JR	1958–2010	Various lines in JR	Philippine National Railways	Philippines	2012–present	Served as a rescue train since 2021
KiHa 52	JNR / JR	1958–2010	Various lines in JR	Myanmar Railways	Myanmar	2007–present	
KiHa 58	JNR / JR	1961–2018	Various lines in JR	State Railway of Thailand	Thailand	1997–unknown end of service	
KiHa 58	JNR / JR	1961–2018	Various lines in JR	Myanmar Railways	Myanmar	2005–unknown end of service	They are also used KiHa 58s which were shipped overseas to Russia & China by the early 1990s-2000s
KiHa 59 series	JR East	1989–2010	Gracia, Kogane services	Philippine National Railways	Philippines	2012–2014; 2019–present	Remodeled from KiHa 28 & KiHa 58s by JR East in 1989 which were originally introduced in the 1960s to be converted as chartered trains. Also made the first Chartered Diesel Trainset to be shipped overseas other than chartered passenger coaches.
KiHa 141 series	JR Hokkaido	1990–present	Various lines in JR	Myanmar Railways	Myanmar	2012–present	Remodeled from 50 series locomotive-hauled passenger coaches
KiHa 181 series	JNR / JR	1968–2010	Various lines in JR	Myanmar Railways	Myanmar	2013–present	
KiHa 183	JNR / JR	1980–present	Various lines in JR	Myanmar Railways	Myanmar	2009–2012	
KiHa 183	JNR / JR	1980–present	Various lines in JR	State Railway of Thailand	Thailand	2021–present	

- Passenger Cars
- Locomotives

=== Retail Shops ===
Outside of Japan, there are various shops which they sell various kinds of used items from Japan. Philippines is one of the known countries outside Japan to set up a retail outlet called, "Japan Surplus Shop" which is found in most towns of the country. They used to sell used appliances, furnitures, gadgets, accessories, and even bicycles designed for women, are still much more preferred by local buyers because of being more affordable than buying those newly locally made home furnitures, or even new gadgets which is becoming more dominating mostly coming from China and so forth. Most of these items depending on the condition.

== Commercial vehicles ==
=== Buses ===
In the early 1990s, Ex-Japanese buses had been rising popular and been common in the developing cities across Asia such as Manila, Philippines, Jakarta, Indonesia & even Yangon, Myanmar.

Like in the Philippines, direct importers near ports in Subic, Zambales, and Cagayan Valley have started auction businesses to import buses, preferably from Japan. Because of this, most of the companies who are operating bus companies based in Manila, Philippines began to grow their transport fleet through buying surplus buses in Japan, which is considered cheaper than buying brand-new buses (which are mostly imported from other countries.) Some buses are locally assembled coach bodies, but they can come out to a higher cost.

Used buses like in the Philippines also requires to convert from RHD to LHD conversion which is in compliance with the Philippine traffic law called Republic Act No. 8506 entitled "An act banning the registration and operation of vehicles with right-hand steering wheel in any private or public street, road or highway, providing penalties therefor and for other purposes." A violation of this law is punished by imprisonment for a period from two years, four months, and one day, up to four years and two months, plus a fine of 50,000 pesos (approx. $1,000). And most of the used buses from Japan in Manila, Philippines are mostly operating within the city and intercity travel which are at least 10 years of age after being phased out in Japan.

=== Trucks ===
As early also in the 1990s, there is no exception that there will be a Japanese domestic market trucks to be called as "Japan Surplus Trucks" for auction & export to any of the developing cities in Asia and even including Russia. Most of the Japanese domestic market trucks that have been exported are Isuzu, Mitsubishi Fuso, Hino and some are Nissan Diesel. These trucks are also proven much reliable and durable since domestic trucks in Japan has no exception for the 10 to 15 year phased out due to the compliance of Japan's existing traffic & environmental regulations and also to avoid any taxes once any domestic truck unit surpassed the age limit to be phasing out.

Japanese domestic market trucks, or 'surplus trucks' after being phased-out in Japan, are extremely popular in the Philippines such as Isuzu Elf, Isuzu Forward, Isuzu Giga, Mitsubishi Canter, Mitsubishi Fuso Super Great & Hino Profia since they are popularly cheaper than buying brand-new Japanese trucks which are locally distributed and even brand-new trucks from China which is about three times as expensive as an ordinary used Japanese domestic truck units. Auctioneers in the Philippines started importing trucks in the 1990s and it had been a staple for small to medium business enterprise owner's particularly in the logistics industry to support and to grow their respective businesses as well,aside from being cheaper than buying new ones they are also built to last.

Another category for Japanese trucks are the smallest ones, or to be called as kei truck, they are also extremely popular in the Philippines once again to be called as "multicab" which are often reconditioned & converted to any public transportation vehicle like jeepney since they are lighter, more economical, more environmentally friendly than the conventional Philippine jeepneys which are mostly powered by used diesel engines from Japan.

Truck engines from Japan also became a boom hit among small workshops and mostly being supplied by local manufacturers in the Philippines which they made Philippine Jeepneys since the 1980s. Popular truck engines being supplied are Isuzu & Mitsubishi Fuso Canter, sometimes, depending from the local clients, they often requested to supply diesel engines from Mazda and Nissan to install them not just for jeepneys, but also called as AUV which is being used for daily commercial use or can be for private use who often they don't have enough budget than buying a brand-new AUVs offered in the Philippine market during those times such as Toyota Tamaraw/Revo, Mitsubishi Adventure, Mitsubishi L300 van or even Isuzu Crosswind.

== JDM-related components ==
=== Speed chime ===
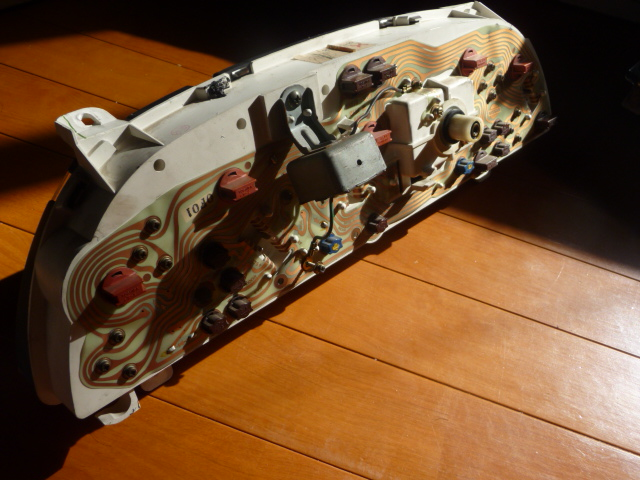
Nissan Skyline R32 series early model; the speed chime is on the back of the instrument panel (metal part near the center).

For a couple of decades, JDM specification model of vehicles often included a speed chime (ja:速度警告音) which rings when a driver exceeds 105 km/h (65 mph) for standard cars and 85 km/h (53 mph) for kei cars. This speed chime was first mandated on November 21, 1974, according to Article 1 of the "Ministerial Ordinance for Partial Revision of Safety Standards for Road Transport Vehicles". Under pressure from the United States and other foreign producers, this requirement was removed in 1986 with "Ministerial Ordinance for Partial Revision of Safety Standards for Road Transport Vehicles" (Ministry of Transport Ordinance No. 3 of 1986) as being a non-tariff barrier. An additional problem was that the repetitive sound could induce sleep in drowsy drivers. Some models used electromechanical glockenspiel-type systems, while other models used a buzzer. Due to that, nickname for speed chime is kinkon (キンコン), an onomatopoeia for a clanging sound.

Several manufacturers continued to offer speed chimes as an option until the early 2000s. The last vehicle to come with the speed chime as standard factory fitment was the Honda City GA1/GA2.

Initial D anime features this speed chime prominently on Takumi Fujiwara's AE86.

=== Speed indicator light ===
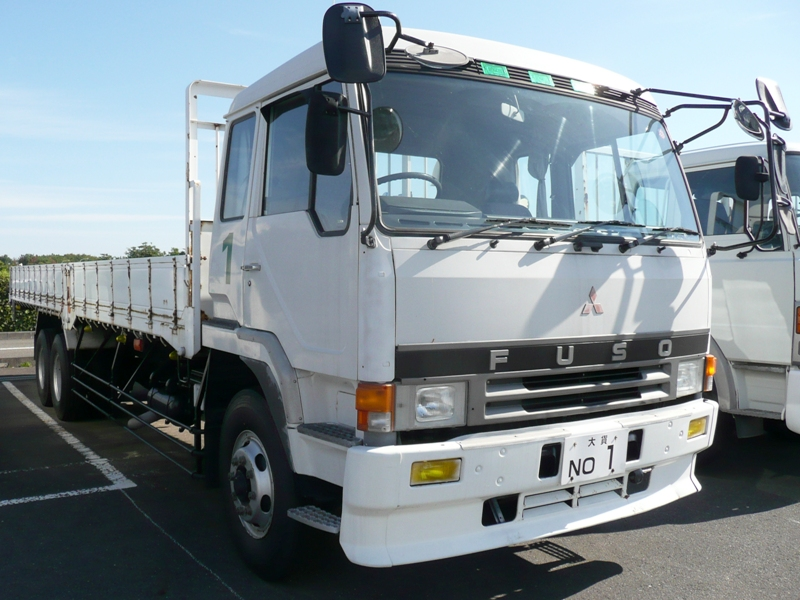
The three green lights on cabin of Fuso The Great is speed indicator light

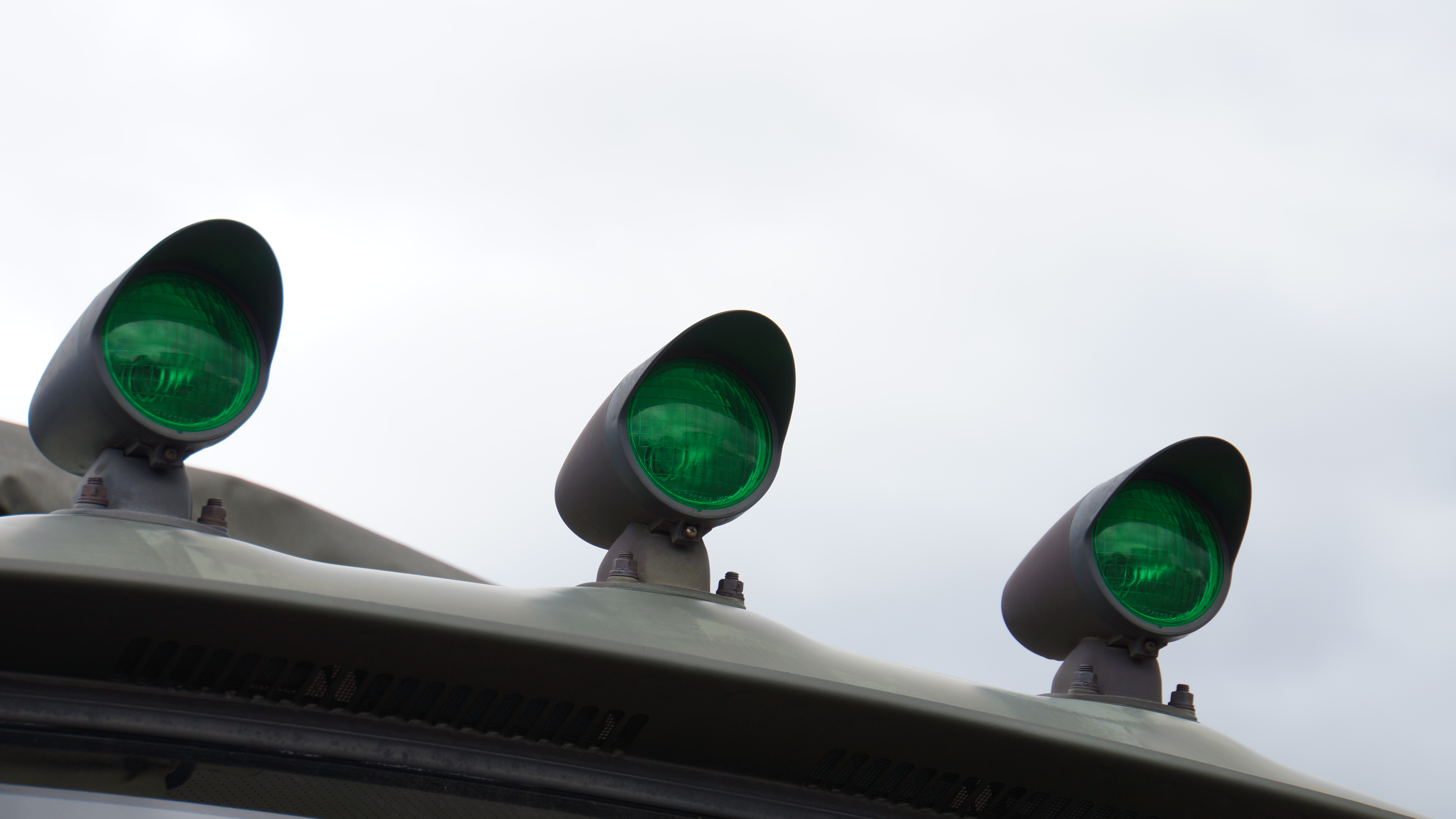
Speed indicator installed on Isuzu TX (HTS12G) truck

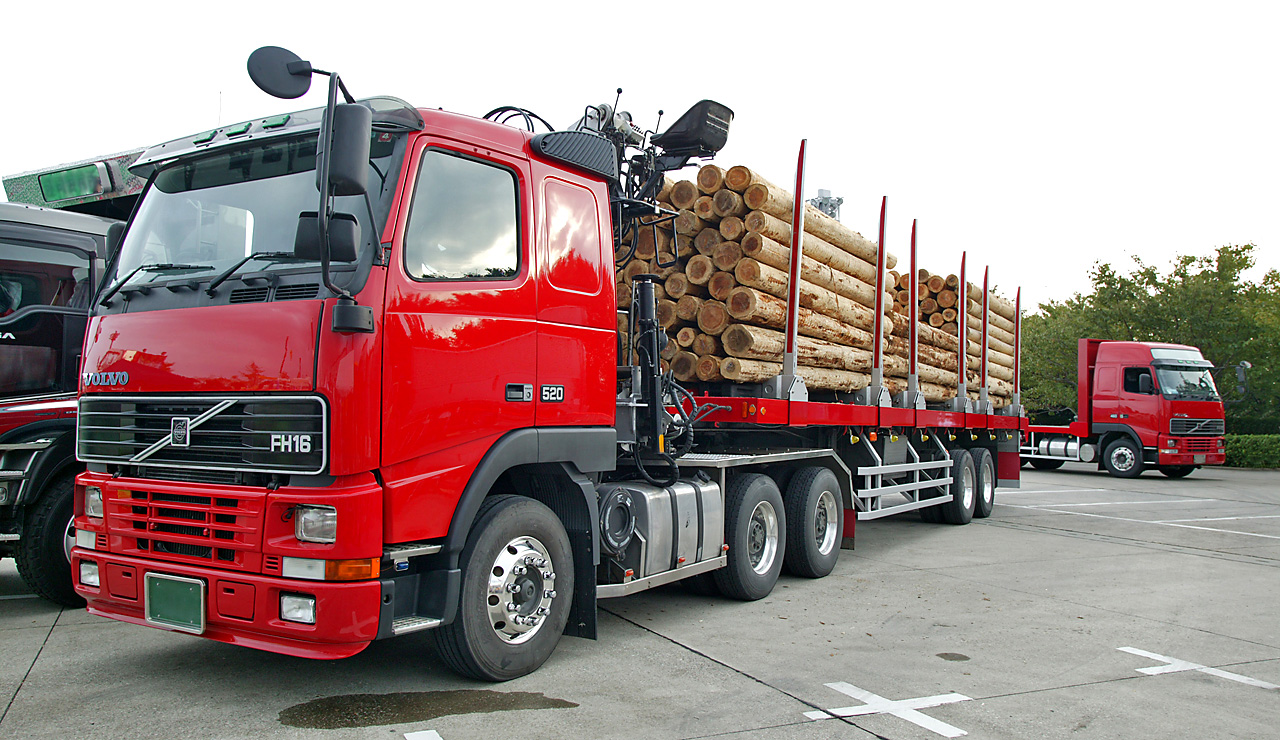
JDM specification of Volvo FH16 (first generation). Note added speed indicator lights.

JDM specification models of trucks (over 5 ton loading capacity, 8 ton gross vehicle weight) were mandated to have speed indicators installed from August 1967, according to Article 48 of the Ministerial Ordinance "Safety Standards for Road Vehicles" based on the provisions of Chapter 3 of the Road Vehicle Law.

Speed indicator lights are only mandated for large trucks and are not necessary for small and medium-sized trucks and large buses, but installation on these vehicles are not prohibited. Speed indicators are installed in front of the cab, or up in the roof.

Article 48 of the Ministerial Ordinance "Safety Standards for Road Vehicles" based on the provisions of Chapter 3 of the Road Vehicle Law for speed indicator light is as following (modified and also translated):

1. The speed indicator device shall be of a structure that automatically turns on the following number of lights (thereinafter referred to as "speed indicator lights") when traveling at the speeds listed in the table below.
  1. 40 km/h or less (*): 1 light
  2. Over 40 km/h up to 60 km/h: 2 lights
  3. Over 60 km/h: 3 lights
2. The speed indicator lamp shall not be equipped with a manual switch or the like that can easily turn off the speed indicator lamp, except for the power switch of the vehicle.
3. The number of speed indicator lights that are on must be visible from a distance of 100m ahead.
4. The light color of the speed indicator lamp shall be yellow-green.
5. The display of the speed indicator lamp must be free of significant error when driving on flat paved roads.
6. The speed display device shall be equipped with a light or other device that enables the driver to confirm its operating state from the driver's seat (usually they are located on speedometer).

Patterns for speed indicator is as following:

Speed	Amount of light(s) turned on	Pattern
60 km/h (37 mph) and beyond	3	ON ON ON
40 to 60 km/h (25 to 37 mph)	2	ON OFF ON
Below 40 km/h (25 mph)	1	OFF OFF ON
Vehicle stopped	none	OFF OFF OFF

==== Abolition and decline ====
Enacted in 1967, this obligatory speed indicator light has proved a non-tariff barrier for European and American manufacturers. Imported heavy-duty trucks had to be modified to meet this certification requirement. Additionally, most people on Japanese roads never knew how to interpret the speed indicator lights. Therefore, this requirement was abolished in 2001. Instead, truck manufacturers now have to install speed limiters which activate at around 90 km/h (56 mph).

== JDM-inspired vehicles ==
Some car enthusiasts like to build replicas of JDM vehicles from locally available cars. For example, enthusiasts in the USA will often take a US-market Honda Civic (sixth generation), convert it from left-hand-drive to right-hand-drive and source the required parts such as the engine and gearbox from the JDM EK9 Type R - which is based on the same platform - in order to make an 'exact' copy. Other forms of "JDM Conversions" include converting a US model first generation Subaru Impreza and fitting JDM STi parts to make it seem as if it is a genuine WRX STi model. In Southeast Asia, it is common practice to convert a base model Mitsubishi Lancer and swap out the necessary parts, right down to the cutting of the floor pan, and create a Lancer Evolution copy.

However, cars such as this would not be authentic JDM cars as they would possess a United States VIN . It is also to be noted that, even with such modifications, it is impossible to recreate the running performance of the original car, as there are many engineering aspects which cannot be replicated by means of "conversion" alone. A good example would be body strengthening methods using spot welding and extra reinforcement on strut mounting points, stress areas in joints, etc. as found in the Lancer Evolution and EK9 Type R models. These reinforcements are not present on base model sixth generation hatchbacks and Mitsubishi Lancers. Hence, replicas or conversions would be similar from a visual standpoint only, as they lack the same level of structural rigidity as the original counterpart.

== See also ==
- Automotive industry in Japan
