= Hasama Station =

Railway station in Funabashi, Chiba Prefecture, Japan

TR03 Hasama Station 飯山満駅
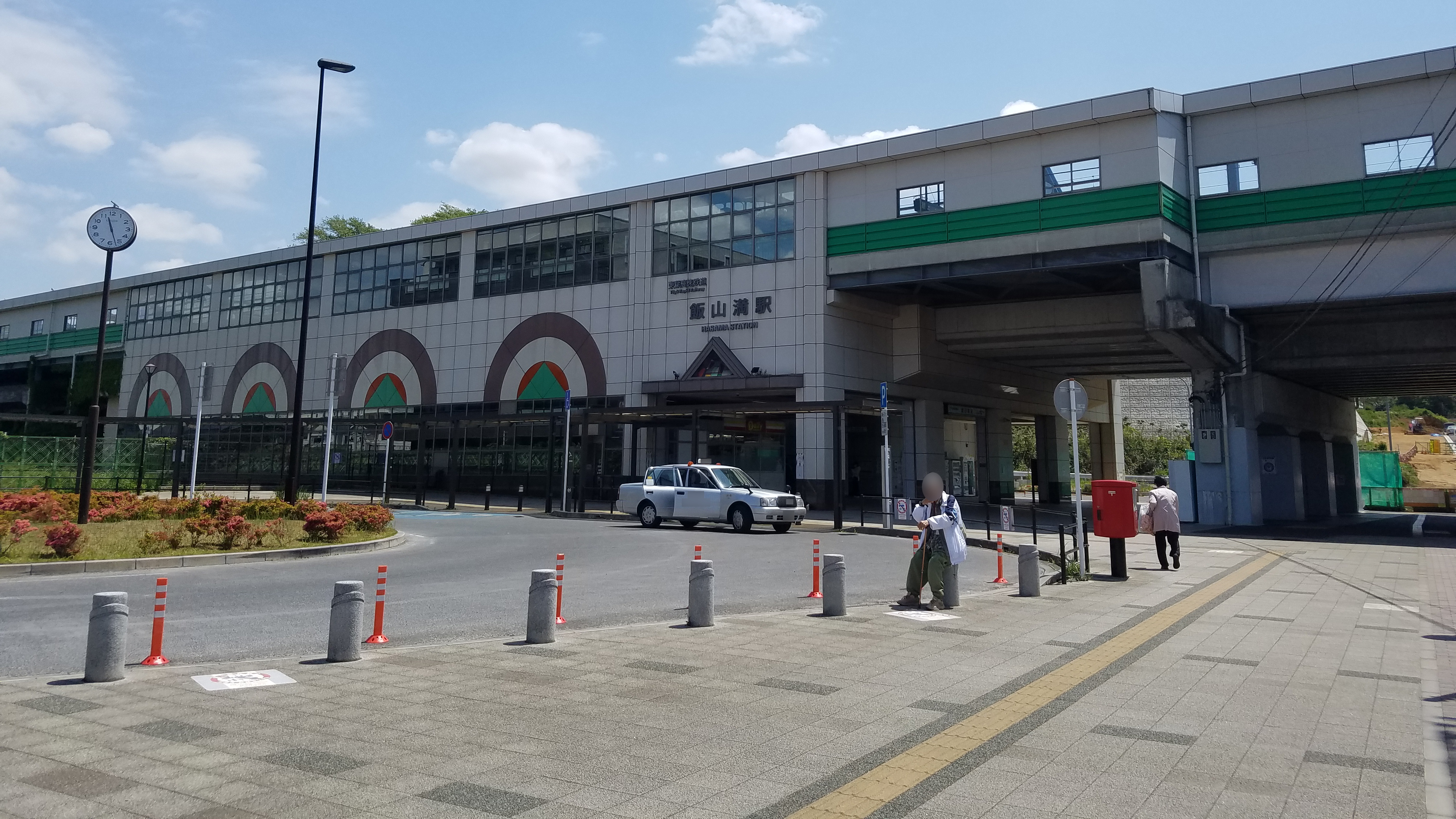
- The north-side view of the station in April 2021

General information
- Location: 2-1053-5 Hasama-cho, Funabashi-shi, Chiba-ken 274-0822; Japan
- Coordinates: 35.7142°N 140.0223°E
- Operator: Tōyō Rapid Railway
- Line: Tōyō Rapid Railway Line
- Distance: 6.1 km from Nishi-Funabashi
- Platforms: 2 side platforms
- Tracks: 2 + 1 bypass

Construction
- Structure type: Elevated

Other information
- Station code: TR03
- Website: Official website

History
- Opened: 27 April 1996; 30 years ago

Passengers
- FY2018: 9,888 daily

Services
Preceding station	Tōyō Rapid Railway	Following station
Higashi-Kaijin TR02 towards Nishi-Funabashi	Tōyō Rapid Railway Line	Kita-Narashino TR04 towards Tōyō-Katsutadai
Location
- Location within Tokyo Keiyo area Location within Chiba Prefecture Location within Japan

Hasama Station (飯山満駅, Hasama-eki) is a passenger railway station in the city of Funabashi, Chiba, Japan, operated by the third sector railway operator Tōyō Rapid Railway.

== Lines ==
Hasama Station is a station on the Tōyō Rapid Railway Line, and is 6.1 km from the starting point of the line at Nishi-Funabashi Station.

== Station layout ==
The station consists of two elevated opposed side platforms with the station building underneath.

=== Platforms ===
1	Tōyō Rapid Railway Line	for Kita-Narashino, Yachiyo-Midorigaoka, and Tōyō-Katsutadai
2	Tōyō Rapid Railway Line	for Nishi-Funabashi, Tōyōchō, Nihombashi, Ōtemachi, and Nakano

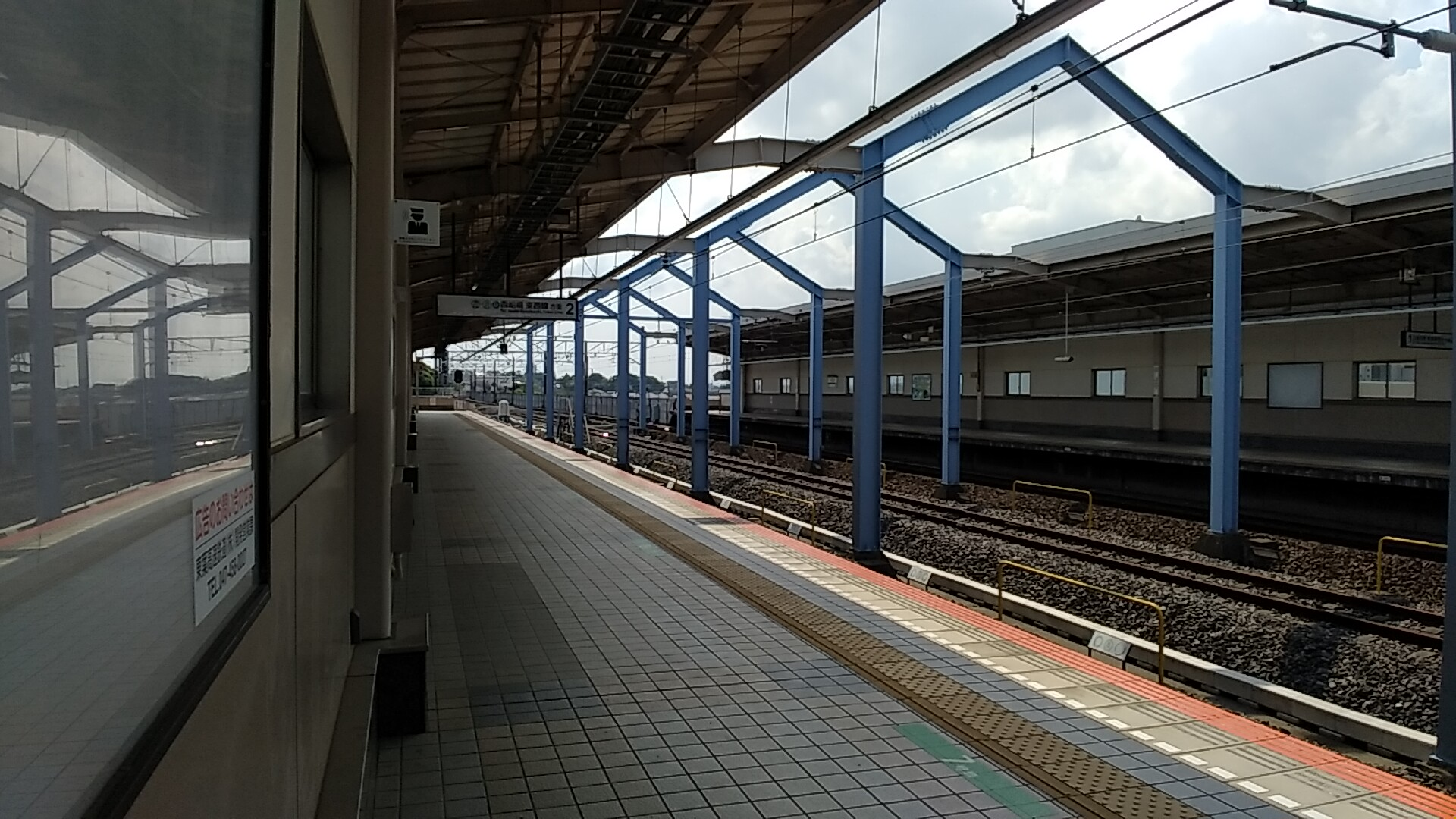
A platform of the west tip

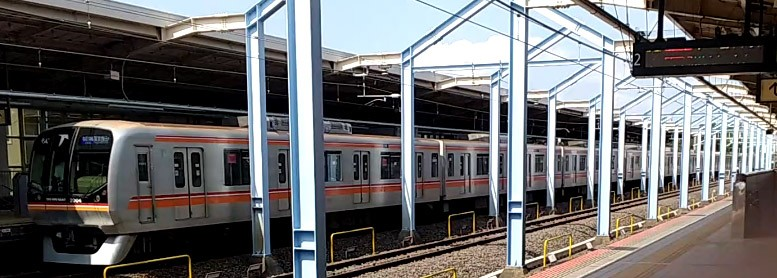
Tōyō Rapid 2000 series

== History ==
Hasama Station was opened on April 27, 1996.

== Passenger statistics ==
In fiscal 2018, the station was used by an average of 9,888 passengers daily.

== Surrounding area ==
- Funabashi City Hall Shibayama Branch Office
- Funabashi City New Takane Public Hall
- Chiba Prefectural Funabashi Higashi High School
- Chiba Prefectural Funabashi Shibayama High School
- Funabashi City Shibayama Junior High School
- Toyo Gate
  - It is registered on Important Cultural Property (Japan), and located near Toyo High School managed by Funabashi Gaken.
- Omiya Shrine

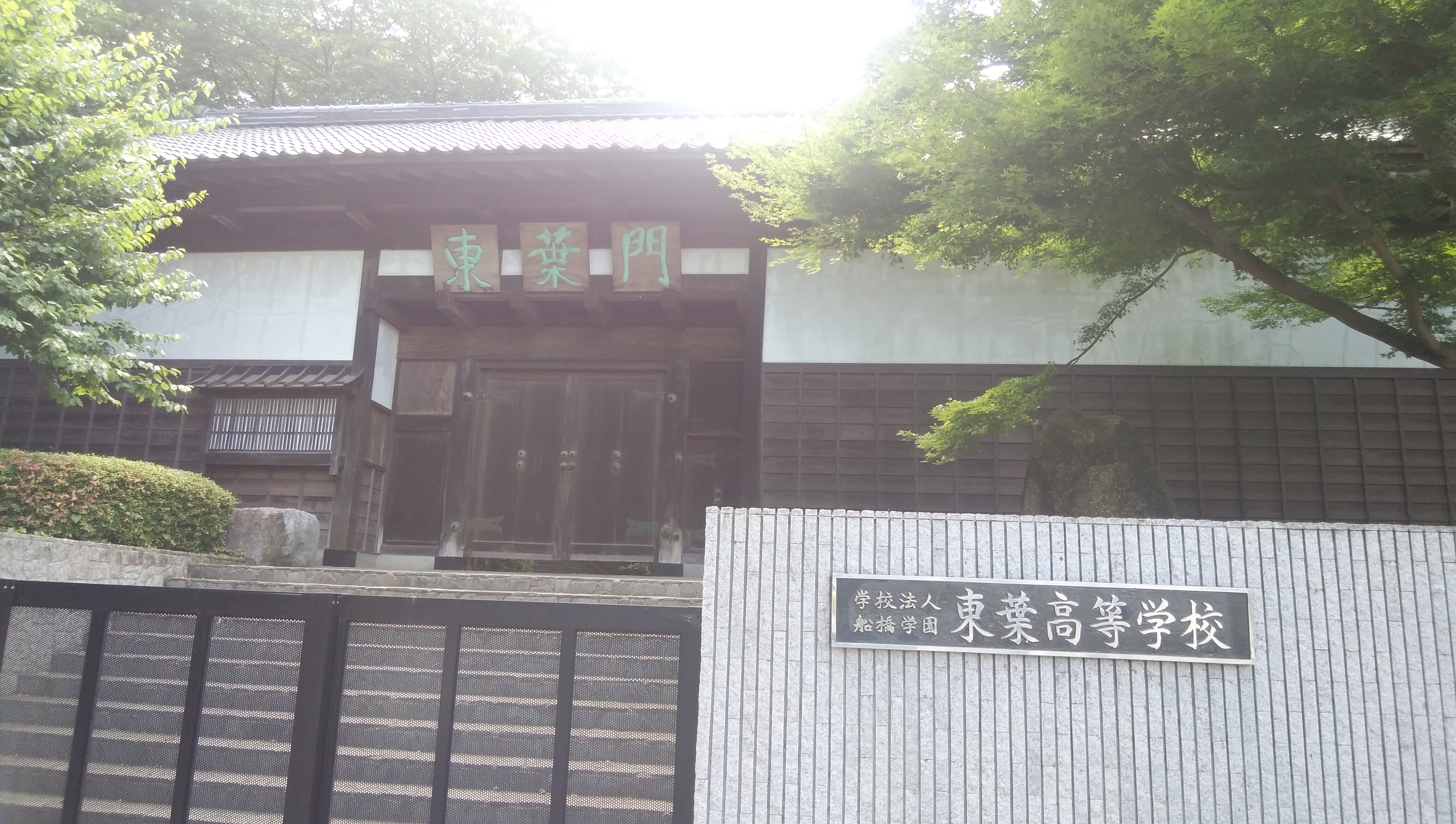
Toyo Gate

== See also ==
- List of railway stations in Japan
