= Kita-Narashino Station =

Railway station in Funabashi, Chiba Prefecture, Japan

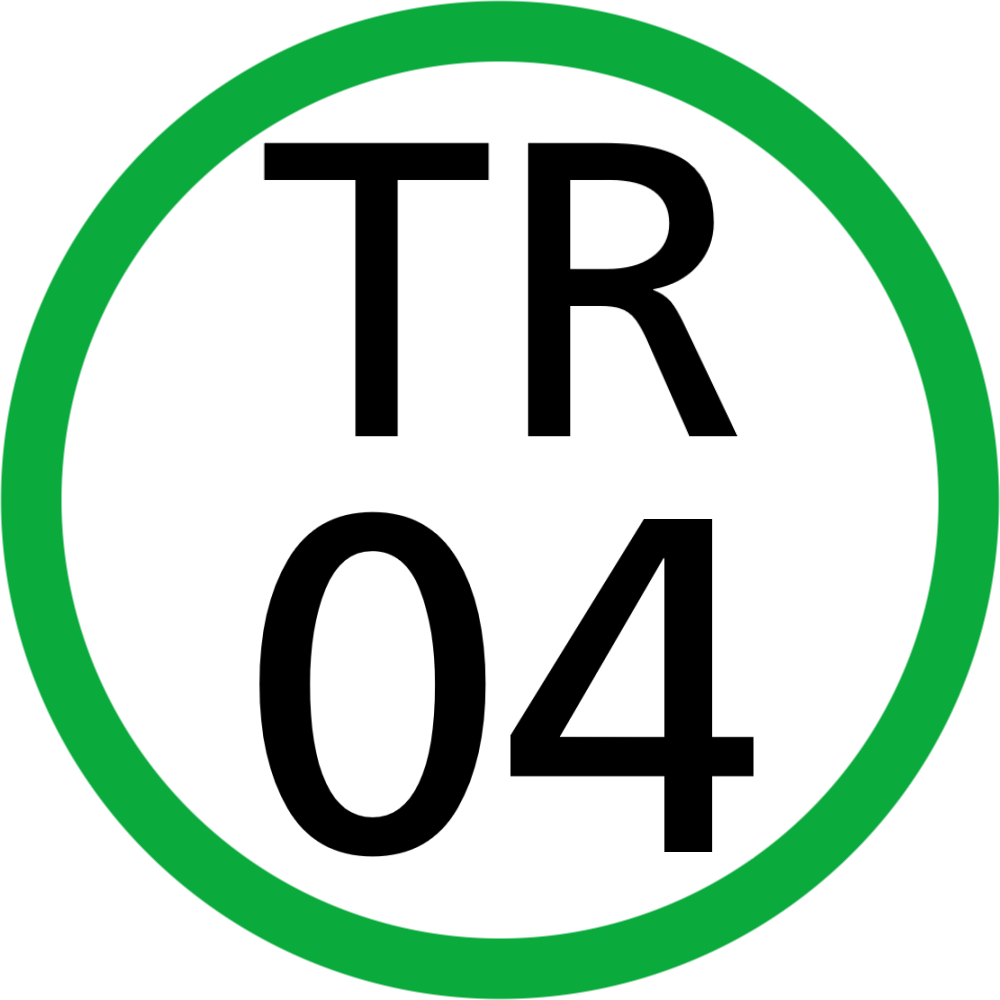
KS70 Kita-Narashino Station 北習志野駅

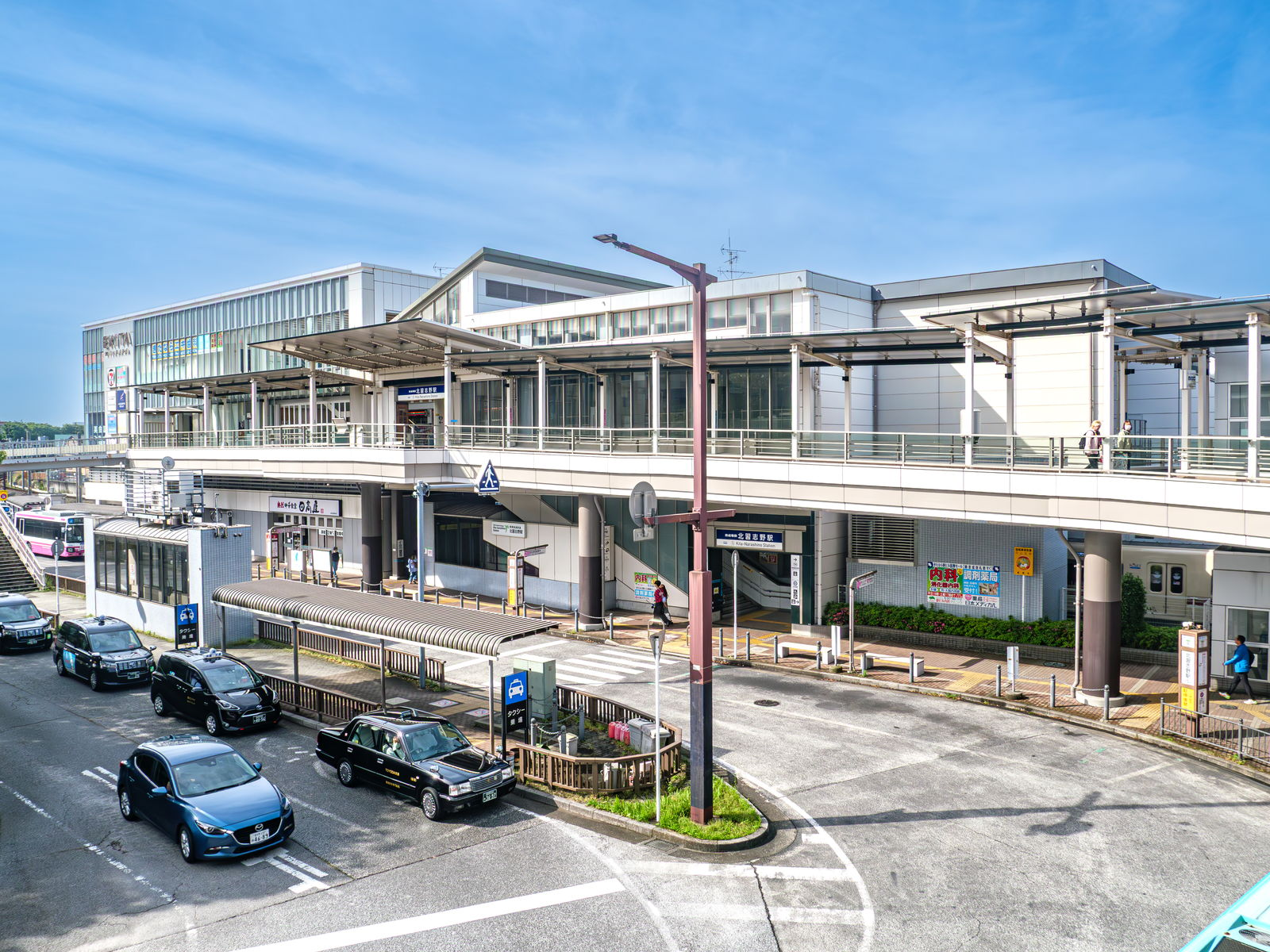
- Keisei Kita-Narashino Station, May 2025

General information
- Location: 3-1-1 Narashinodai, Funabashi-shi, Chiba-ken 274-0063; Japan
- Coordinates: 35.7217°N 140.0423°E
- Operator: Keisei Electric Railway; Tōyō Rapid Railway
- Lines: Keisei Matsudo Line; Tōyō Rapid Railway Line
- Platforms: 2 island platforms

Other information
- Station code: ○KS70 (Keisei) ○TR04 (Tōyō)

History
- Opened: 11 April 1966; 60 years ago

Passengers
- 2018: 46,256 (Shin-Keisei); 20,594 (Tōyō) daily

Services
Preceding station	Keisei	Following station
Takanekido KS71 towards Matsudo	Matsudo Line	Narashino KS69 towards Keisei Tsudanuma
Preceding station	Tōyō Rapid Railway	Following station
Hasama TR03 towards Nishi-Funabashi	Tōyō Rapid Railway Line	Funabashi-Nichidaimae TR05 towards Tōyō-Katsutadai
Location
- Location within Tokyo Keiyo area Location within Chiba Prefecture Location within Japan

Kita-Narashino Station (北習志野駅, Kita-Narashino-eki) is an interchange passenger railway station located in the city of Funabashi, Chiba Prefecture, Japan.

== Lines ==
Kita-Narashino Station is a junction station for the Keisei Electric Railway's Matsudo Line and the Tōyō Rapid Railway’s Tōyō Rapid Railway Line. It is 21.0 kilometers from the terminus of the Matsudo Line at Matsudo Station and is 8.1 kilometers from the terminus of the Tōyō Rapid Railway Line at Nishi-Funabashi Station.

== Station layout ==
Keisei Kita-Narashino Station has a single island platform, with an elevated station building. The Tōyō Rapid Railway Line is an underground station with a single island platform.

=== Platforms ===
1	Keisei Matsudo Line	for Shin-Tsudanuma and Keisei-Tsudanuma; Keisei Chiba Line for Chiba Chūō
2	Keisei Matsudo Line	for Shin-Kamagaya, Yabashira, and Matsudo
3	Tōyō Rapid Railway Line	for Tōyō-Katsutadai
4	Tōyō Rapid Railway Line	for Nishi-Funabashi; Tokyo Metro Tozai Line for Toyocho, Otemachi, and Nakano; Chūō Line (Local) for Mitaka

== History ==
Kita-Narashino Station was opened on 11 April 1966, as a station on the Shin-Keisei Electric Railway. The Tōyō Rapid Railway Line connected to the station on 27 April 1996. The Shin-Keisei Line completed a new station building in 2009.

Effective April 2025, platforms 1 and 2 came under the aegis of Keisei Electric Railway as the result of the buyout of the Shin-Keisei Electric Railway. The move was completed on 1 April 2025.

== Passenger statistics ==
In fiscal 2018, the Shin Keisei portion of the station was used by an average of 46,256 passengers daily. During the same period the Tōyō Rapid Railway portion of the station was used by 20,594 passengers daily.

== Surrounding area ==
- Narashinodai housing complex
- Kitanarashino Neighborhood Park
- Funabashi City Higashi Library / Narashinodai Public Hall
- Funabashi City Takago Elementary School

== See also ==
- List of railway stations in Japan
