= Tōyō Rapid 2000 series =

Japanese train type

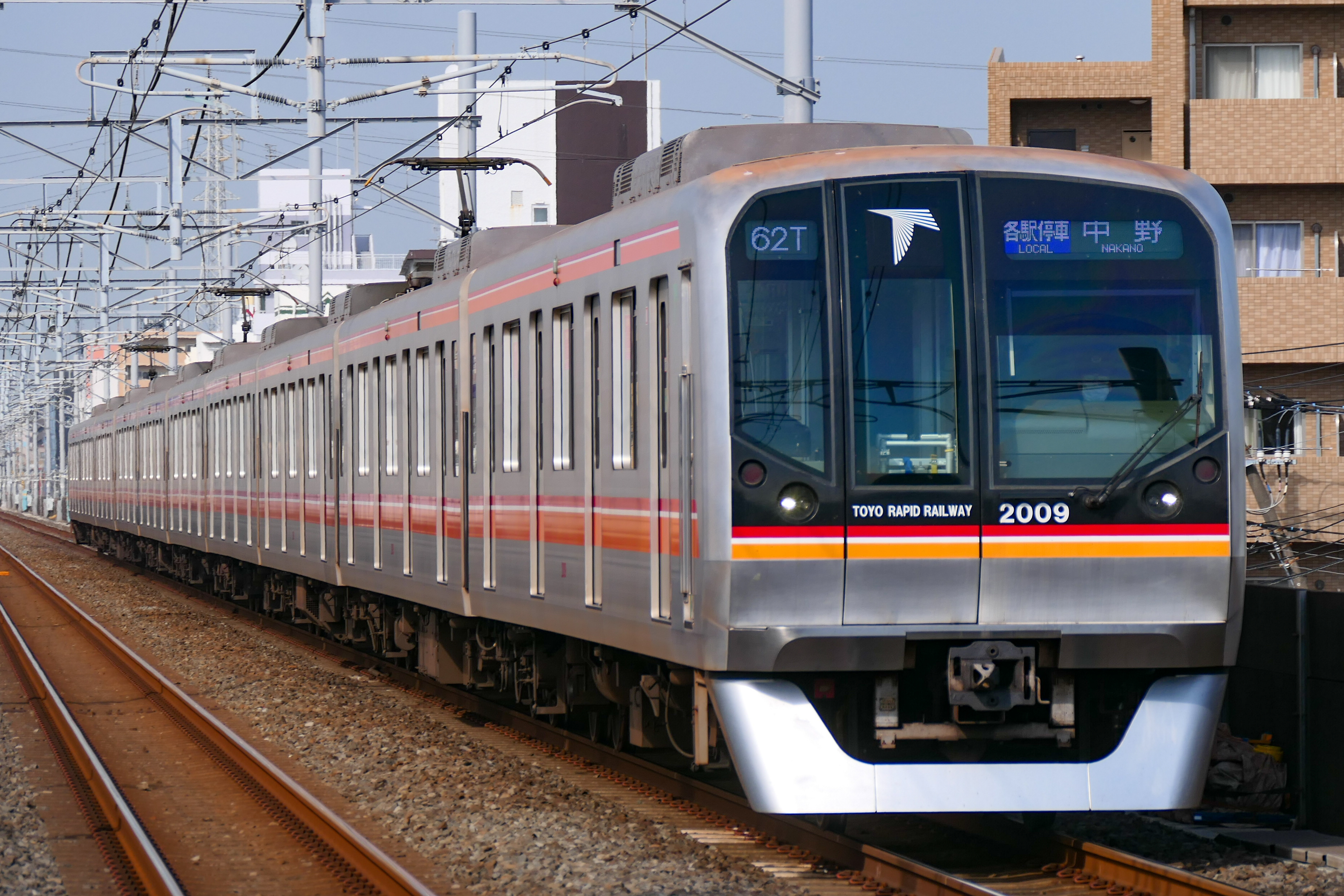
- Set 2109 in May 2022
- In service: 7 December 2004 – present
- Manufacturer: Hitachi
- Family name: A-train
- Replaced: Tōyō Rapid 1000 series
- Refurbished: 2011–2018
- Number built: 110 vehicles (11 sets)
- Formation: 10 cars per trainset
- Operator: Tōyō Rapid Railway
- Lines served: Tōyō Rapid Line; Tokyo Metro Tōzai Line

Specifications
- Car body construction: Aluminium
- Car length: 20 m (65 ft 7 in)
- Maximum speed: 100 km/h (62 mph) (on Tōzai Line)
- Traction system: VVVF
- Acceleration: 3.3 km/(h⋅s) (2.1 mph/s)
- Deceleration: 3.5 km/(h⋅s) (2.2 mph/s) (service); 5.0 km/(h⋅s) (3.1 mph/s) (emergency)
- Electric system: 1,500 V DC overhead
- Bogies: SS068, SS168
- Safety system: New CS-ATC
- Track gauge: 1,067 mm (3 ft 6 in)

The Tōyō Rapid 2000 series (東葉高速鉄道2000系) is an electric multiple unit (EMU) train type operated on the Tōyō Rapid Railway, an extension of Tokyo Metro Tōzai Line. It replaces the Tōyō Rapid 1000 series.

A total of 11 10-car sets were built between 2004 and 2006 by Hitachi, based on the Tokyo Metro 05 series 13th-batch (sets 05-140 to 05-143) (05N series) design.

The driver's handle is a single handle controlled by the left hand and it has a dead man system. The partition between the driver's cab and passenger saloon has three windows. Two of the windows are usually screened by curtains on the Tōzai Line, but one window is left unobstructed so passengers can look the view ahead, even on subway tracks.

== Formation ==
Sets are formed as follows, with car 1 at the Tōyō-Katsutadai end.

| Car No. | 1 | 2 | 3 | 4 | 5 | 6 | 7 | 8 | 9 | 10 |
|---|---|---|---|---|---|---|---|---|---|---|
| Designation | CT1 | M1 | M2 | T | Mc1 | Tc | T' | M1 | M2' | CT2 |
| Numbering | 2100 | 2200 | 2300 | 2400 | 2500 | 2600 | 2700 | 2800 | 2900 | 2000 |

== Other technical details ==
- Front end style: Round lights, Have a front skirt
- Headlights: HID
- Destination indication: 3-color LED
- LED displays inside car: 4 per car
- Control system: IGBT-VVVF
- Motor/trailer: 5M5T
- Motor output (per motor): 165 kW
- Train power output: 3,300 kW
- Gear ratio: 6.21 (87:14)
- Pantograph: single-arm x3
- Door width: 1.3 m (4 ft 3 in)
- Seat configuration (intermediate cars): 3-7-7-7-3
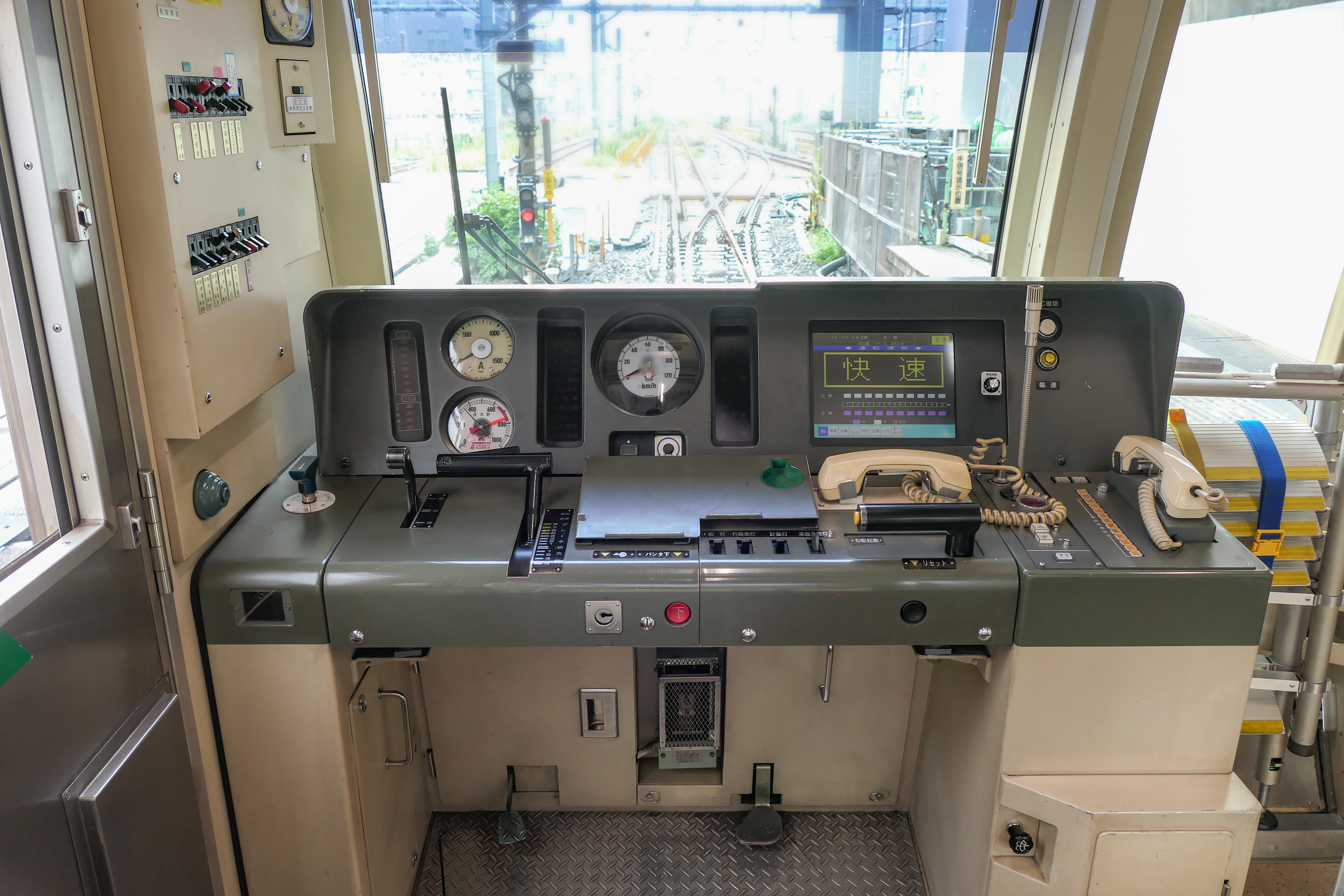
Driver's cab

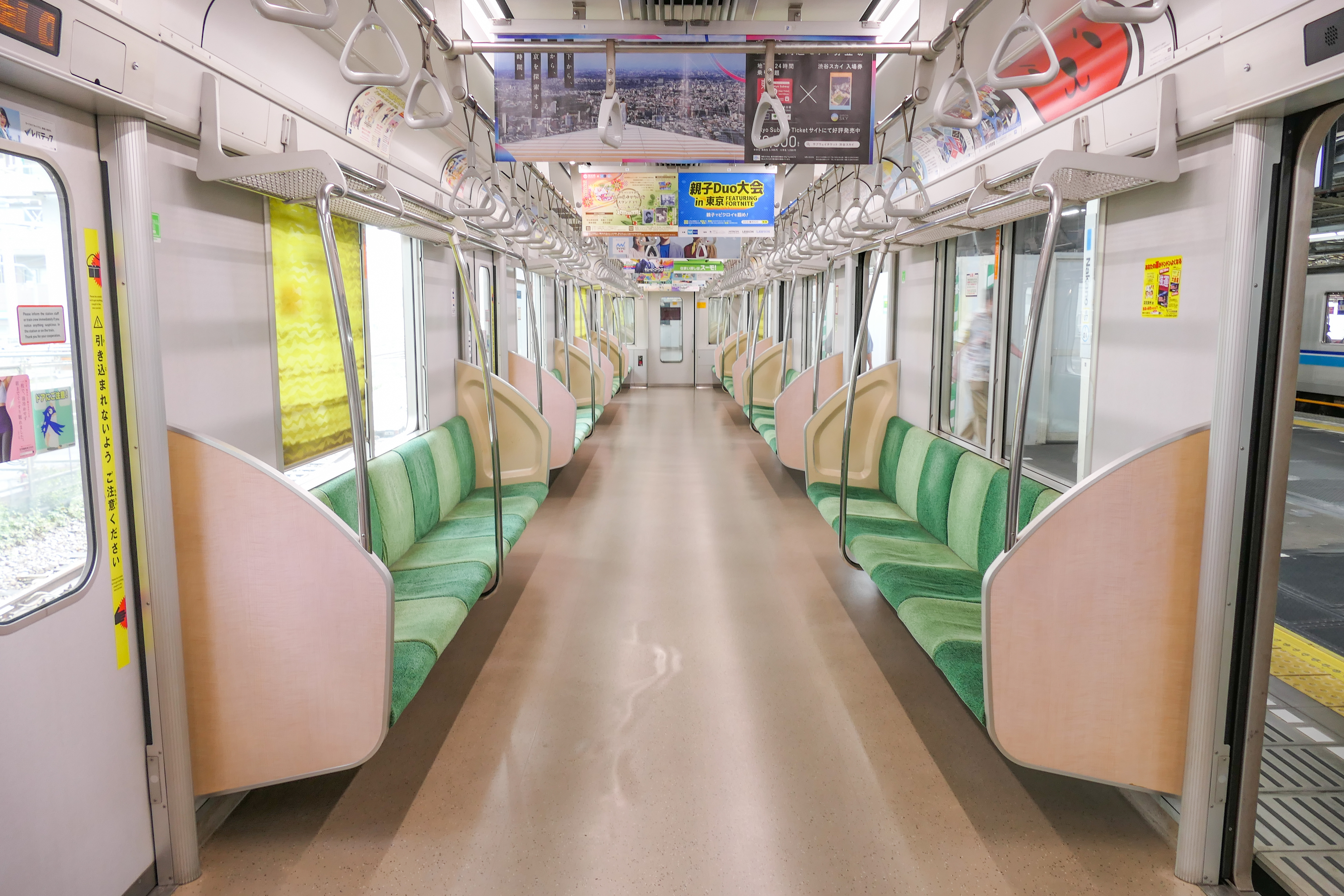
Interior view

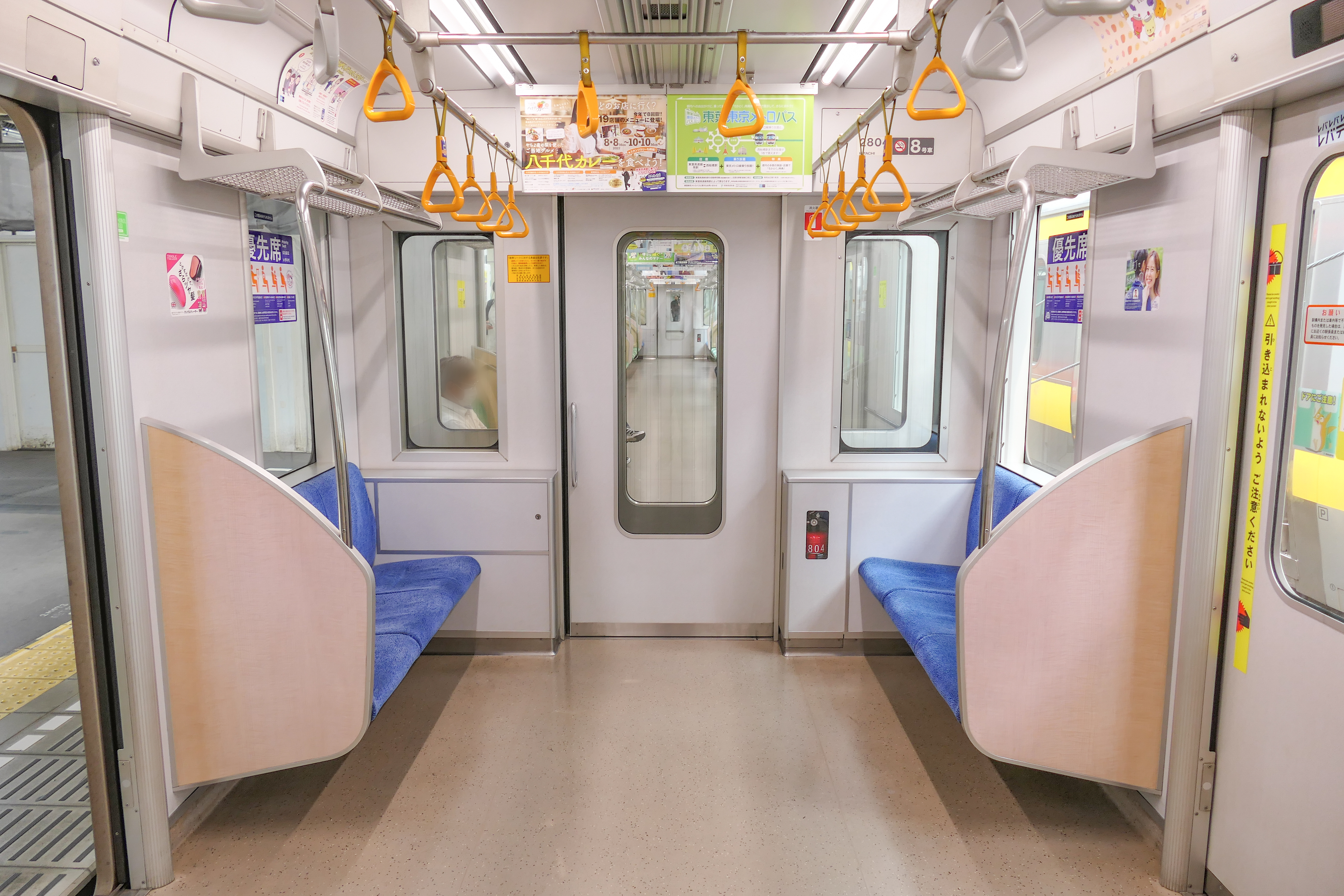
Priority seats

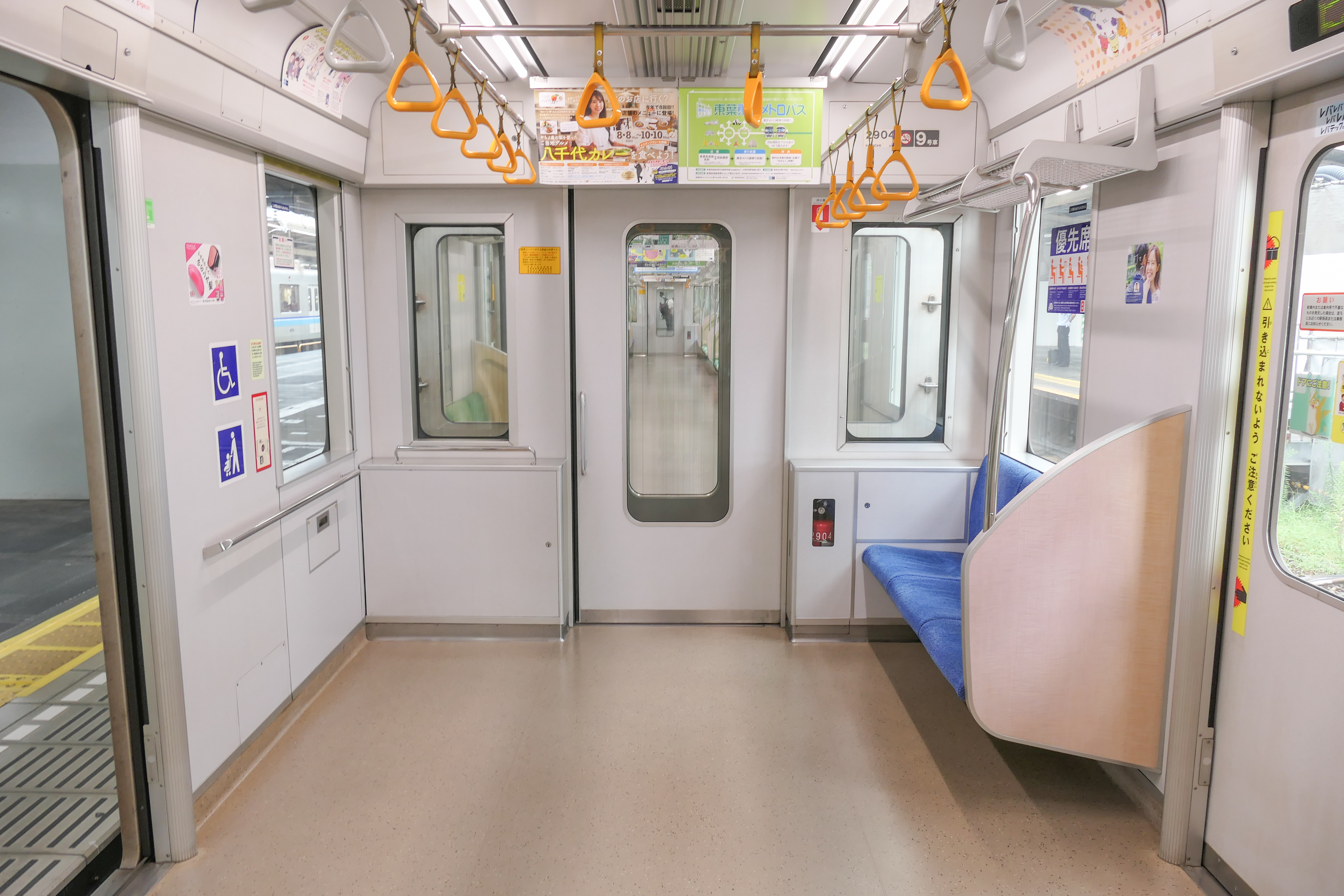
Wheelchair space

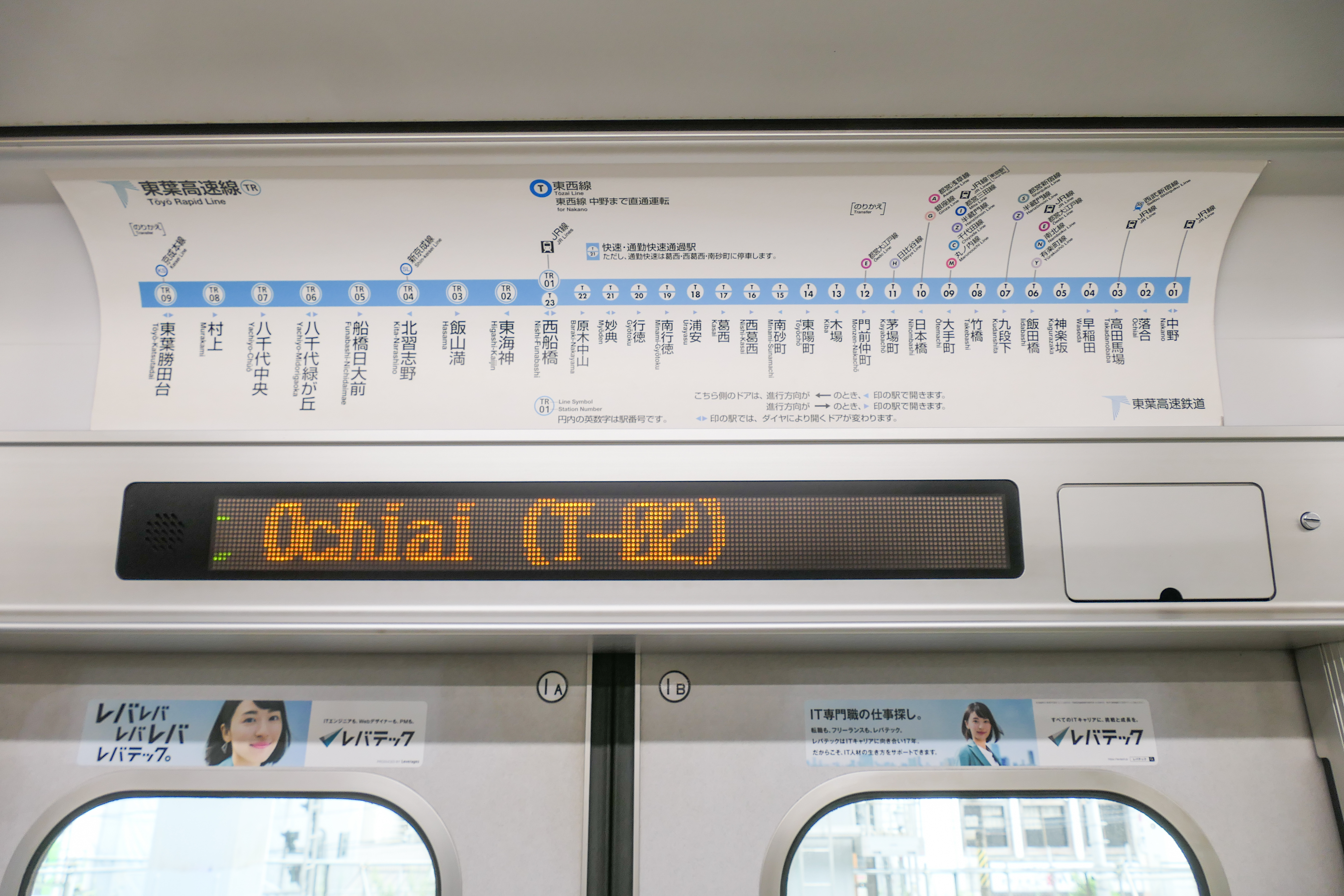
LED passenger information display
