= Tokyo Metro 5000 series =

Japanese train type

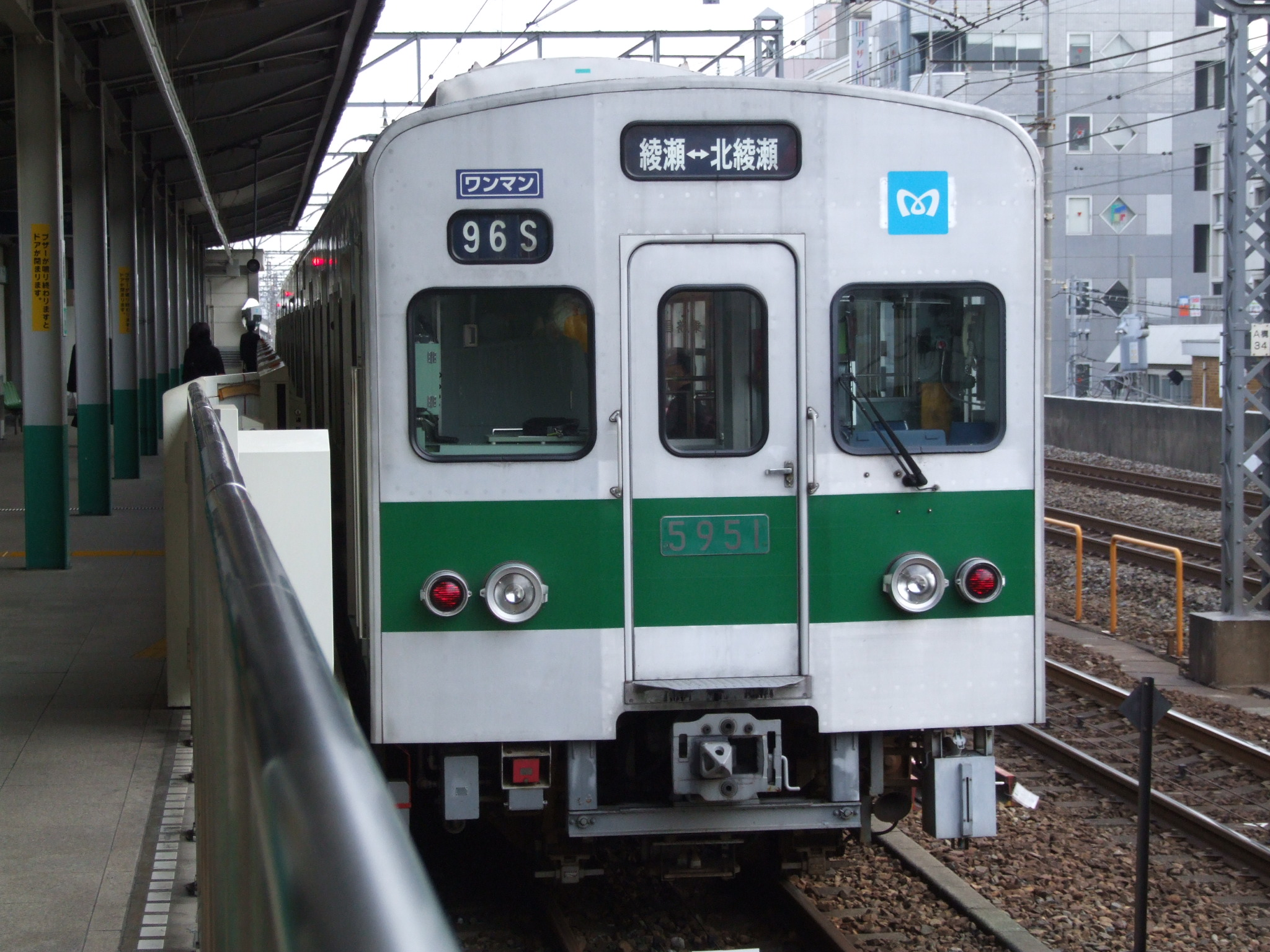
- A Chiyoda Line 3-car set at Ayase Depot in December 2007
- In service: 1964–2007 (Tozai Line); Until 2014 (Chiyoda Branch Line) (Japan); 2007–2020 (Indonesia)
- Manufacturers: Kisha Seizo, Tokyu Car Corporation, Nippon Sharyo, Kinki Sharyo, Kawasaki Heavy Industries, Teikoku Sharyo
- Constructed: 1964–1981
- Entered service: 23 December 1964
- Scrapped: 2005–2007, 2014–2020
- Number built: 428 vehicles
- Number in service: None
- Number preserved: 3 vehicles (stored at Ayase Depot)
- Number scrapped: 397 vehicles
- Successor: Tokyo Metro 05 series (Japan), 205 series (Indonesia)
- Formation: 3 cars per trainset (used for Chiyoda Branch line until 2014) 10 cars per trainset (for Tokyo Metro Tozai Line) 8/10 cars per trainset (KCI)
- Fleet numbers: 61-62
- Capacity: 136 (50 seating) (end cars), 144 (54/55/58) (intermediate cars)
- Operators: Tokyo Metro (previously TRTA) (1964–2014); Kereta Commuter Indonesia (KCI) (2007–January 2020 (Regular Service))
- Depots: Ayase (Tokyo Metro); Depok (KCI)
- Lines served: Former:Tokyo Metro: Tokyo Metro Tozai Line; Tōyō Rapid Line; Chūō-Sōbu Line (All stopped 2006); Tokyo Metro Chiyoda Line (Ayase Branch) (All stopped 2014); KCI: KA Commuter line Jakarta Kota–Cikarang (All stopped 2020)

Specifications
- Car body construction: Stainless steel/aluminium
- Car length: 20 m (65 ft 7 in)
- Width: 2.87 m (9 ft 5 in) (end car), 2.856 m (9 ft 4.4 in) (stainless steel intermediate cars), 2.852 m (9 ft 4.3 in) (aluminium intermediate cars)
- Height: 3.775 m (12 ft 4.6 in) (1st-2nd batches), 3.9 m (12 ft 10 in) (3rd batch onwards), 4.135 m (13 ft 6.8 in) (including air-conditioning), 4.145 m (13 ft 7.2 in) (including pantograph)
- Doors: 4 per car
- Maximum speed: 100 km/h (62.1 mph)
- Traction system: Resistor control
- Power output: 100 kW x 4 per motor car
- Transmission: Westinghouse Natal (WN) drive; Gear ratio: 6.19 : 1
- Acceleration: 3.3 km/(h⋅s) (2.1 mph/s)
- Deceleration: 4 km/(h⋅s) (2.5 mph/s) (service); 5 km/(h⋅s) (3.1 mph/s) (emergency)
- Electric system: 1,500 V DC
- Current collection: Overhead wire
- Bogies: FS358, FS502, FS502A/B
- Braking systems: Electromagnetic direct braking and dynamic braking, later regenerative braking
- Safety systems: WS-ATC, CS-ATC, ATS-B, ATS-P
- Coupling system: Shibata
- Track gauge: 1,067 mm (3 ft 6 in)

The Tokyo Metro 5000 series (東京メトロ5000系, Tōkyō Metoro 5000-kei) was a retired electric multiple unit (EMU) train type first built 1964, which operated as 3-car sets on the Tokyo Metro Chiyoda Line branchline in Tokyo, Japan until 2014. 10-car sets were used on the Tokyo Metro Tōzai Line until March 2007.

== Chiyoda Line 3-car sets ==
Until 30 May 2014, two three-cars sets were in operation, sets 61 and 62. These two aluminium-bodied sets were used on the Chiyoda Line branch between Ayase and Kita-Ayase, and were formed as shown below.

Car No.	1	2	3
Designation	CT	M1	CM2
Numbering	5900	5400	5100

Cars 2 and 3 were each fitted with one single-arm pantograph.

== Tozai Line 10-car sets ==
Ten-car 5000 series sets operated on the Tokyo Metro Tozai Line from December 1964 until March 2007. They were also used on the JR Chuo-Sobu Line between Nakano Station and Mitaka Station, between Nishi-Funabashi Station and Tsudanuma Station (weekday mornings and evenings only), and on the Tōyō Rapid Line between Nishi-Funabashi Station and Tōyō-Katsutadai Station.

Later sets had aluminium bodies.

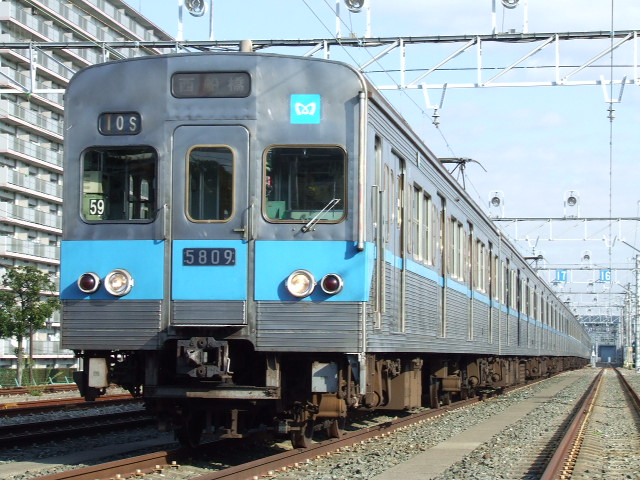
Tozai Line stainless steel 5000 series at Fukukawa Depot in December 2006

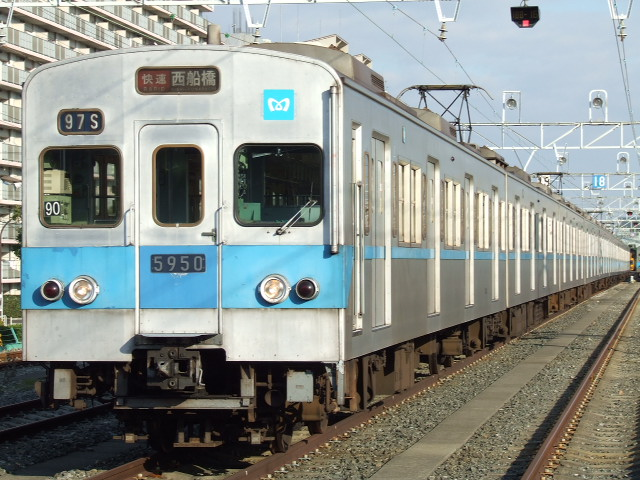
Tozai Line aluminium-bodied 5000 series at Fukukawa Depot in December 2006

=== Interior ===
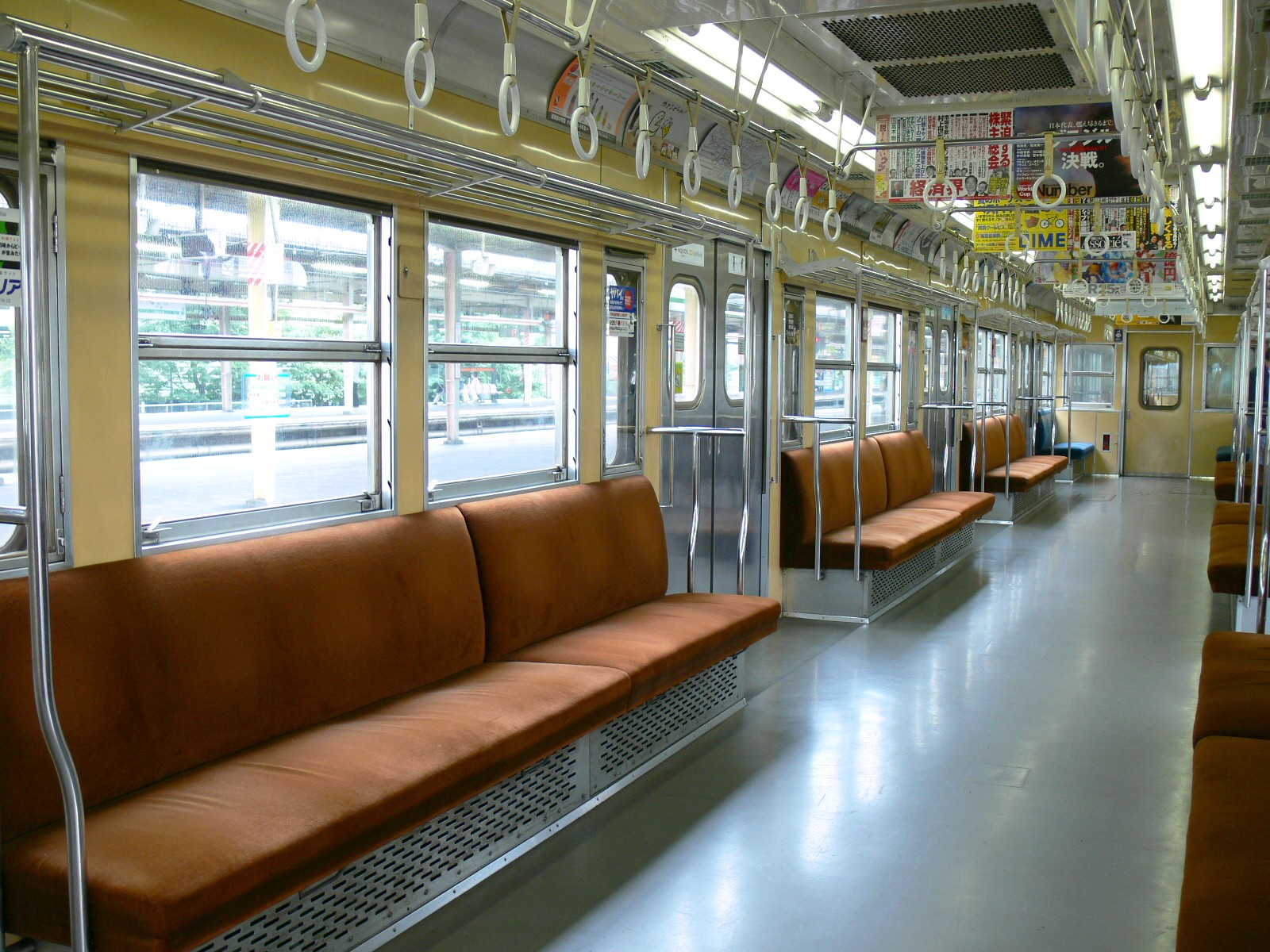
Interior of Tozai Line set in June 2006

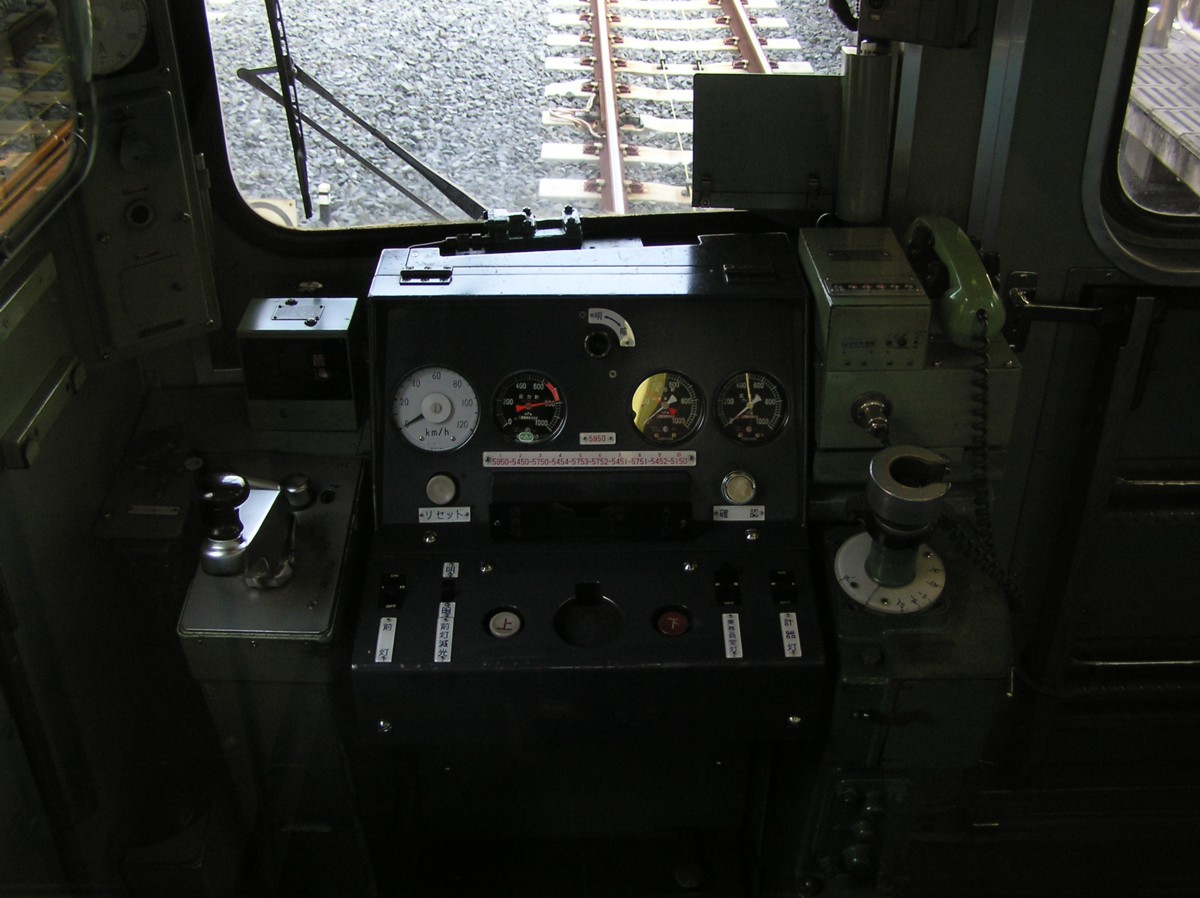
Driver's cab of 5000 series

== Other operators ==
=== Toyo Rapid Railway ===
Ten former Tozai Line sets were converted in 1995 to Tōyō Rapid 1000 series EMUs for use on the Tōyō Rapid Railway extension of the Tozai Line.

=== Indonesia ===
Three former Tozai Line ten-car sets (5809, 5816, and 5817) were shipped to Indonesia in 2007, entering service with KRL Jabotabek (now Kereta Commuter Indonesia) in the Jakarta area from January 2007. Since 2020, they have been replaced by the 205 series.

The three sets were each reduced to eight-car formations upon arrival in Indonesia. Set 5816 was withdrawn in September 2014.

Of the two remaining sets, set 5817 was lengthened to ten cars in July 2017 with the addition of two intermediate cars from former Toyo Rapid 1000 series set 1091.

Set 5817 finally ended its final operation in Jakarta in January 2020. Although the set was not scrapped, it was stationary in Depok Baru Station until it was withdrawn and grounded at Pasirbungur Station on 27 January 2022, ending the career of the Tokyo Metro 5000 Series in Indonesia.

Four days before set 5817's withdrawal, trainset 5809 was grounded at Pasirbungur Station on 23 January 2022.

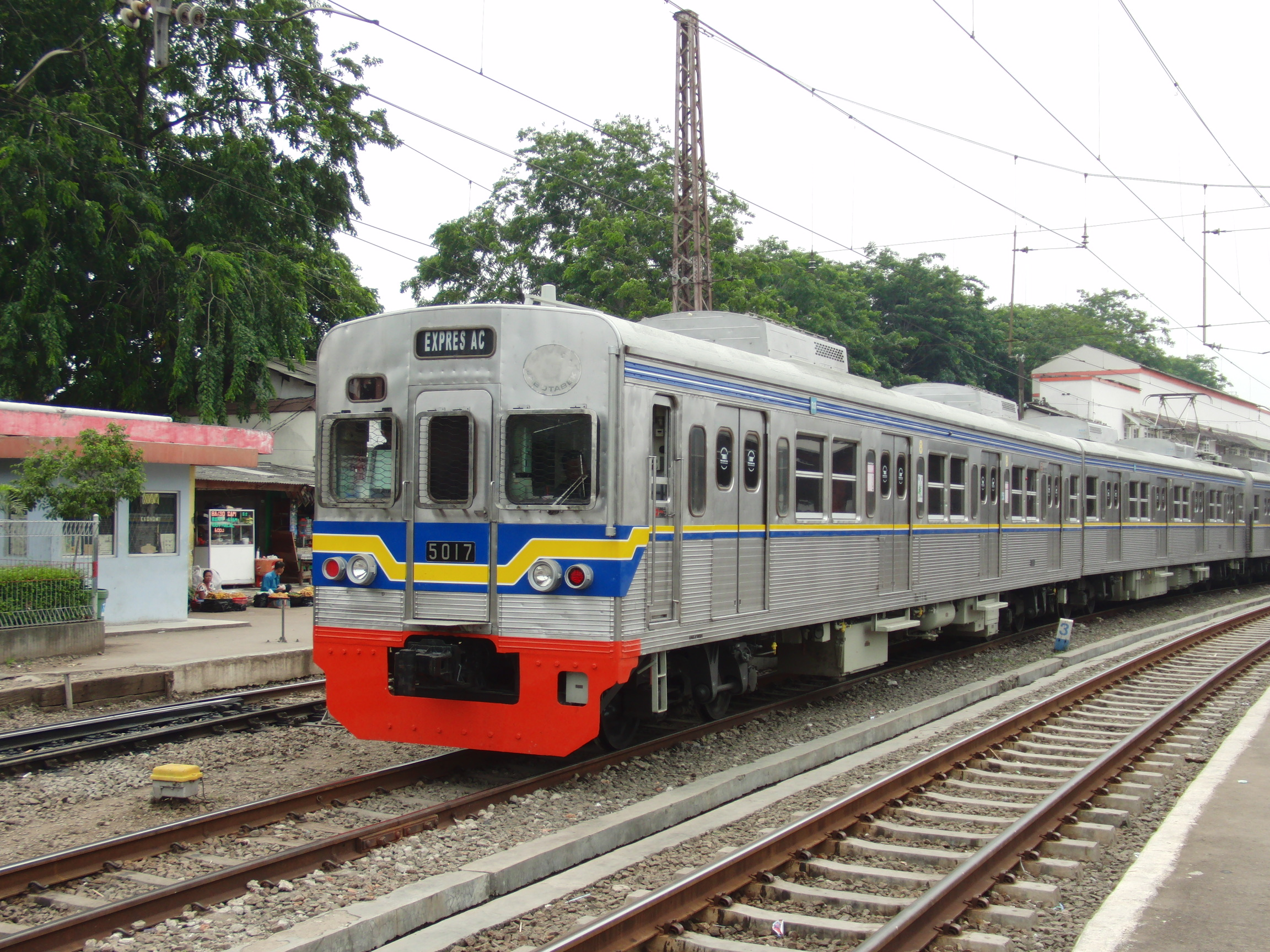
Set 5817 in Jakarta in November 2010

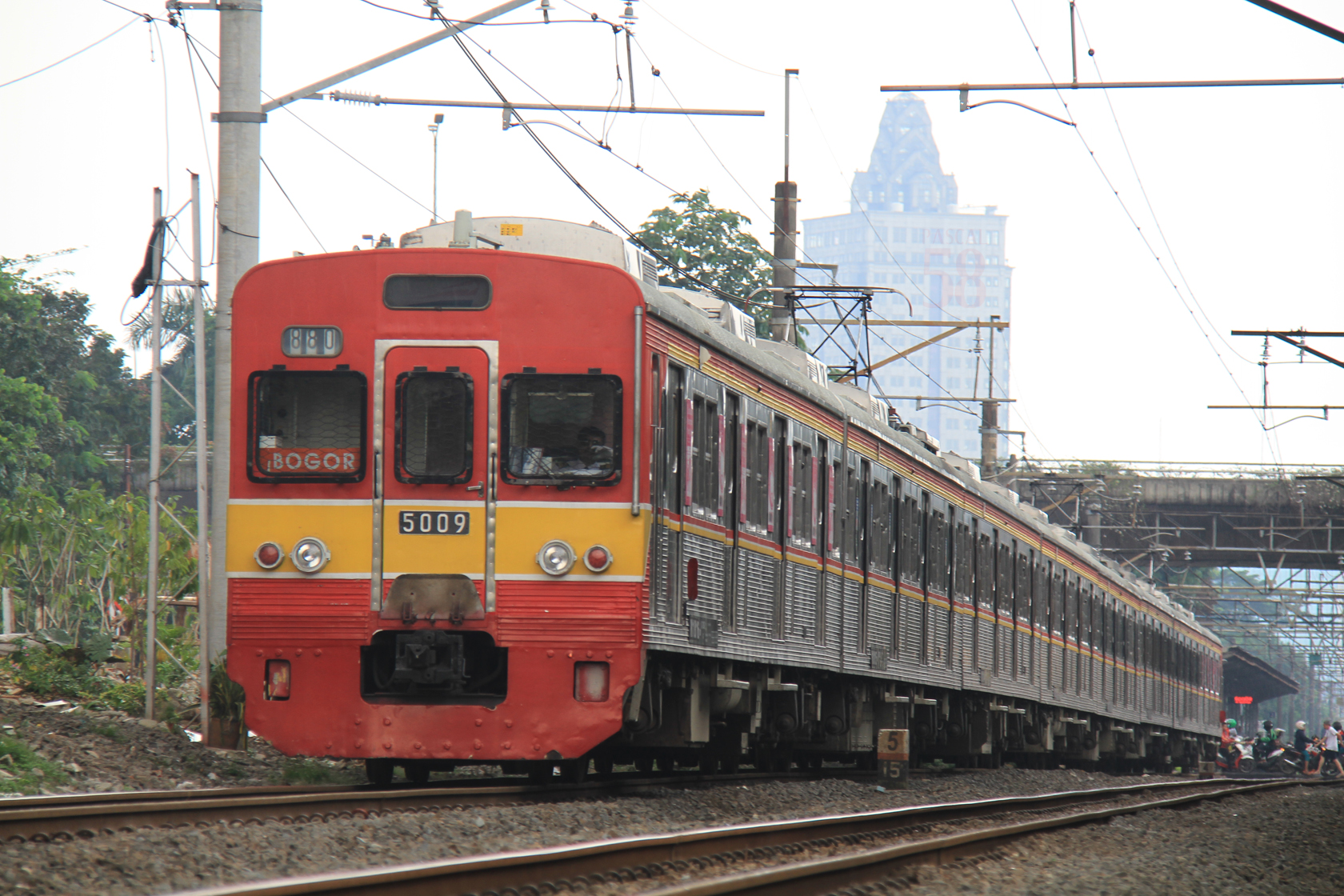
8-car set 5809 in October 2016, using revised livery

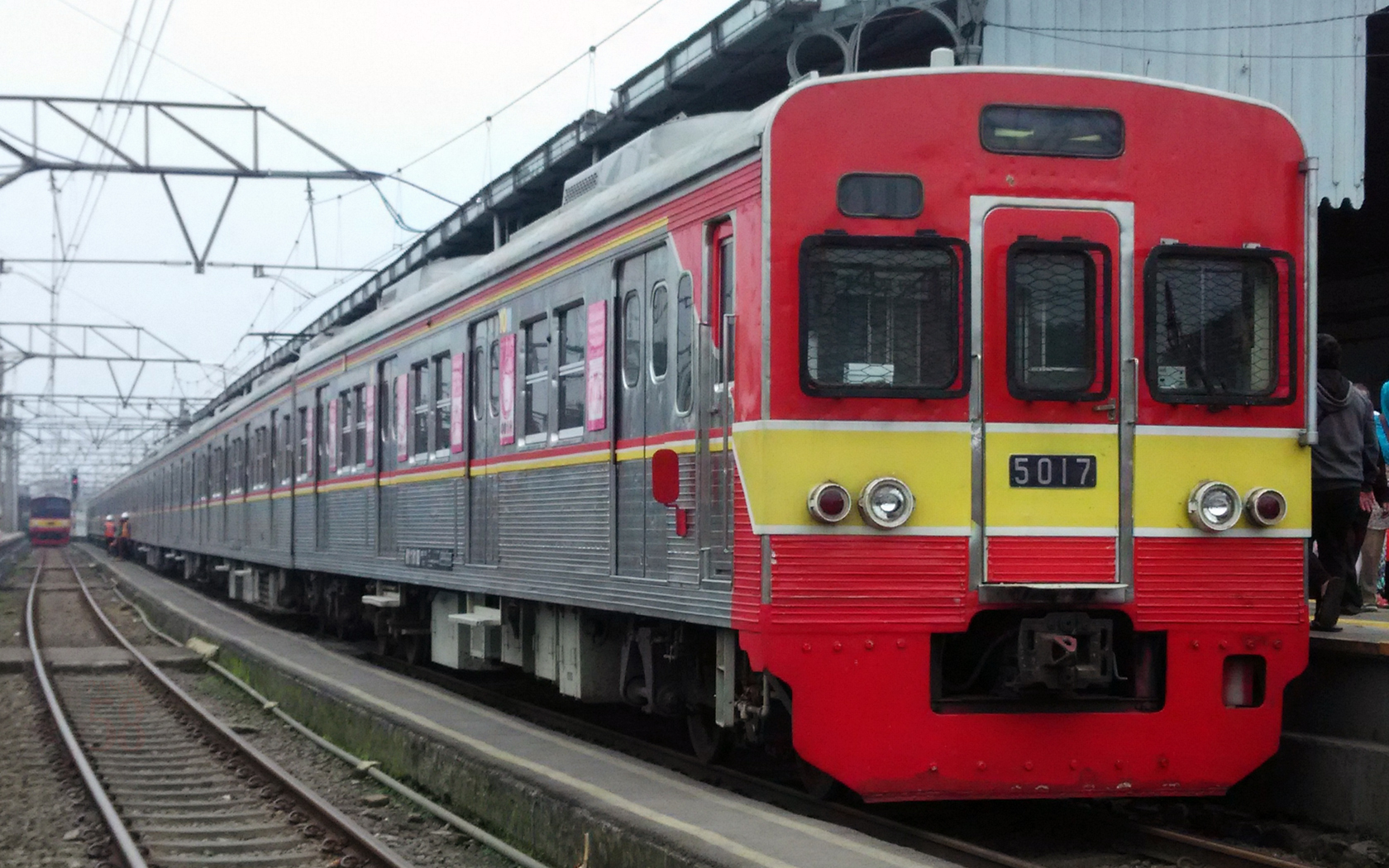
10-car set 5817 in July 2017

== Preserved examples ==
- Car 5833 in Shin-Suna Ayumi Park, Koto, Tokyo
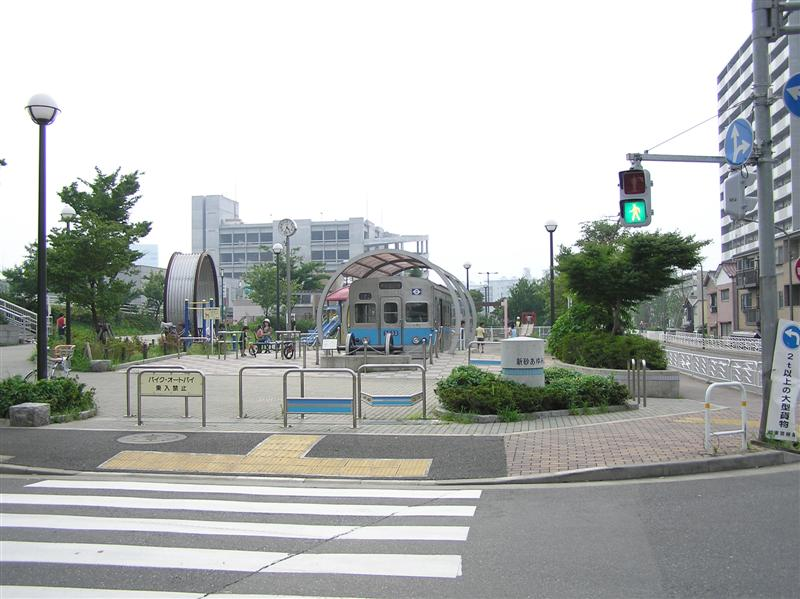
Shin-Suna Ayumi Park in Tokyo in July 2006 (Removed in 2012)
