= Tōyō Rapid 1000 series =

Japanese train type

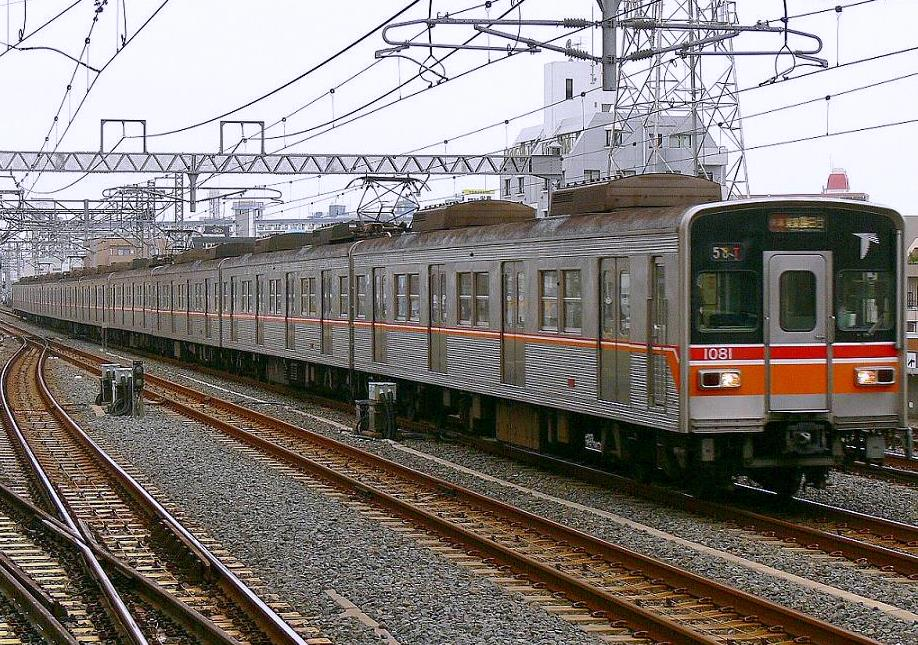
- Set 1081 in September 2006
- In service: 1995–2007 (Japan); 2007–2019 (Indonesia)
- Constructed: 1964–1967
- Refurbished: 1995–1997
- Scrapped: 2007–2022
- Number built: 120 vehicles (12 sets)
- Number preserved: 0
- Number scrapped: 90 vehicles (9 sets) (Japan), 30 vehicles (3 sets) (Indonesia)
- Formation: 10 cars per trainset (Toyo Rapid Railway); 8/10 cars per trainset (Kereta Commuter Indonesia)
- Operators: Toyo Rapid Railway; Kereta Commuter Indonesia
- Lines served: Toyo Rapid Railway Line; KRL Commuterline

Specifications
- Car body construction: Stainless steel
- Car length: 20,000 mm (65 ft 7 in)
- Width: 2,870 mm (9 ft 5 in)
- Maximum speed: 100 km/h (62.1 mph)
- Traction system: Field excitation control
- Power output: 100 kW x 4 per motor car
- Acceleration: 3.5 km/(h⋅s) (2.2 mph/s)
- Deceleration: 4 km/(h⋅s) (2.5 mph/s) (service); 5 km/(h⋅s) (3.1 mph/s) (emergency)
- Electric systems: 1,500 V DC overhead catenary
- Current collection: Lozenge-type pantograph
- Track gauge: 1,067 mm (3 ft 6 in)

The Tōyō Rapid 1000 series (東葉高速鉄道1000形) was an electric multiple unit (EMU) commuter train type that formerly operated on the Tōyō Rapid Railway Line, an extension of the Tokyo Metro Tozai Line in Tokyo, Japan. A total of twelve ten-car sets were converted in 1995 from former TRTA 5000 series sets. They were retired from service in December 2006, replaced by the Tōyō Rapid 2000 series.

The last three sets to be withdrawn (1061, 1081, 1091) were shipped to Indonesia in 2006 and 2007, where they are operated by KRL Jabodetabek on suburban services in the Jakarta area. They were retired from service in 2019, replaced by 205-0 and 205-5000 series.

== Operations ==
=== Until December 2006 ===
- Tōyō Rapid Line
- Tokyo Metro Tōzai Line

=== Until 2019 ===
- Kereta Commuter Indonesia

== Formations ==
The ten-car sets operated by Toyo Rapid Railway were formed of eight motored ("M") cars and two non-powered trailer ("T") cars as shown below, with the "CT1" car at the eastern end.

Designation	CT1	M1	M2	M1	Mc2	Tc	M1	M2	M1	CT2
Numbering	1xx1	1xx2	1xx3	1xx4	1xx5	1xx6	1xx7	1xx8	1xx9	1xx0
Capacity	136	144								136

- "xx" in the car numbers corresponded to the individual unit number (01 to 10).
- The M1 cars each had one lozenge-type pantograph.

== Former identities ==
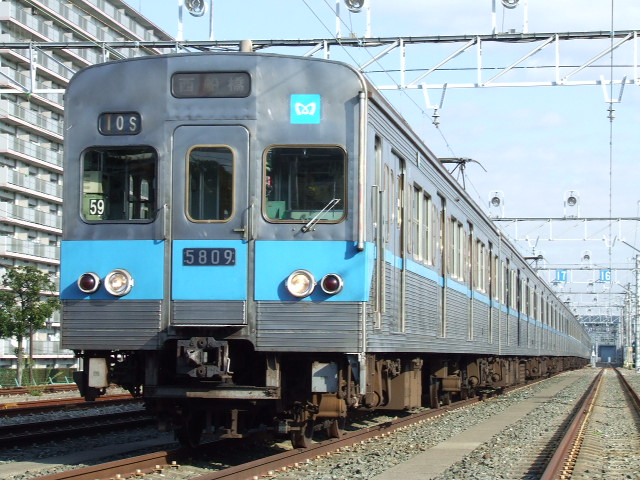
A Tokyo Metro (previously TRTA) 5000 series set in 2006

The original TRTA set numbers were as shown below.

Toyo Rapid Set No.	TRTA set No.
01	24
02	25
03	19
04	32
05	10
06	36
07	26
08	22
09	20
10	21
11	23
12	44

- Sets 11 and 12 were not used in service, and were subsequently used as sources of spares before being scrapped.

== Overseas operations ==
Three ten-car sets (1061, 1081, and 1091) were shipped to Indonesia from 2006 for use on suburban services operated by Kereta Commuter Indonesia (previously called "KA Commuter Jabodetabek" or "KRL Jabotabek") in Jakarta from January 2007. The sets were initially reduced to eight-car formations, but former set 1061 was withdrawn in December 2015, and set 1091 was split to donate a pair of intermediate cars to lengthen set 1081 to ten cars and also to former Tokyo Metro 5000 series set 5817 to lengthen that set to ten cars also.

Since 2019, with the increasing number of the newer JR East 205 series EMU, set 1081 was retired from service.

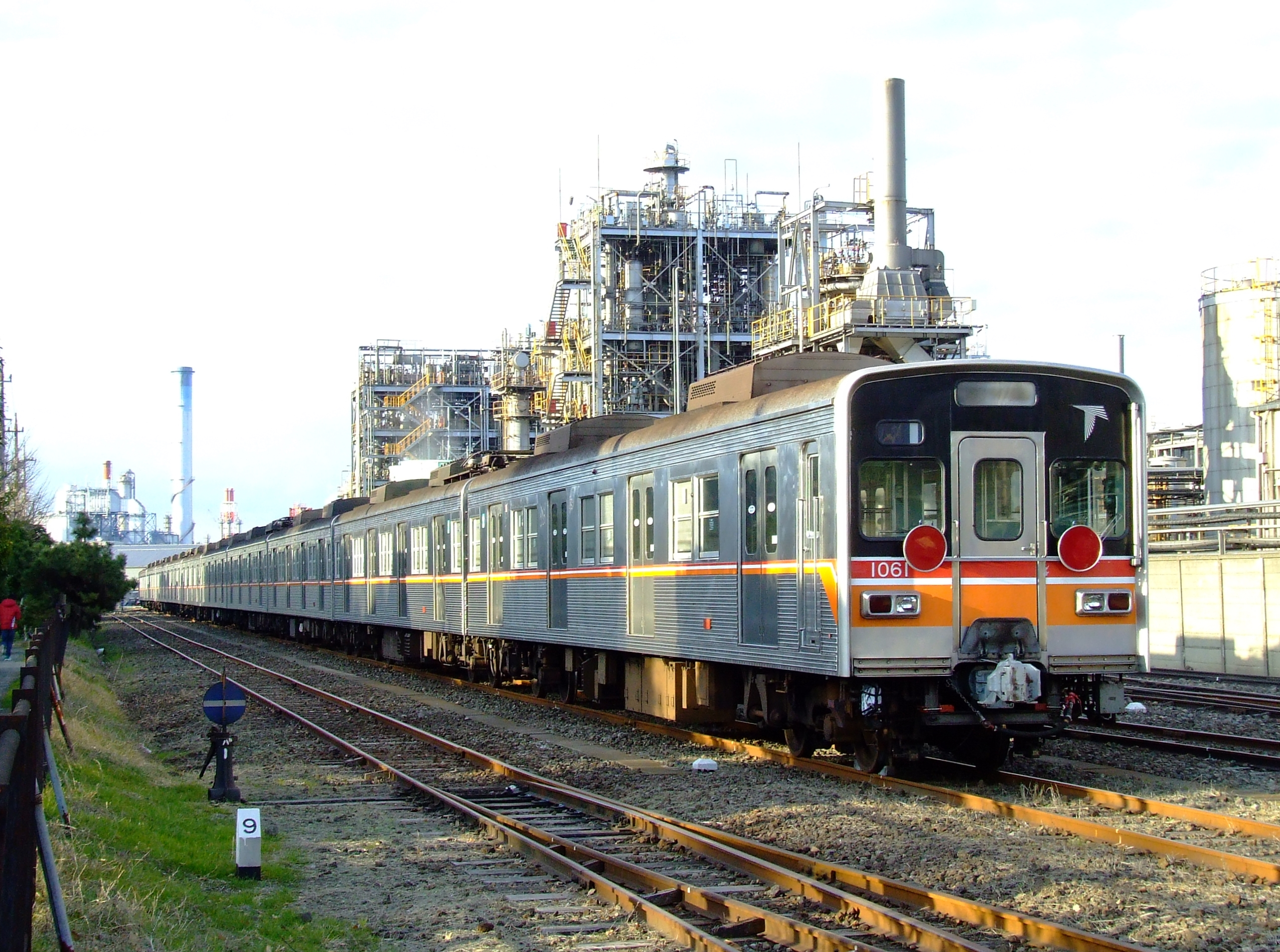
Set 1061 awaiting shipping to Indonesia in January 2007

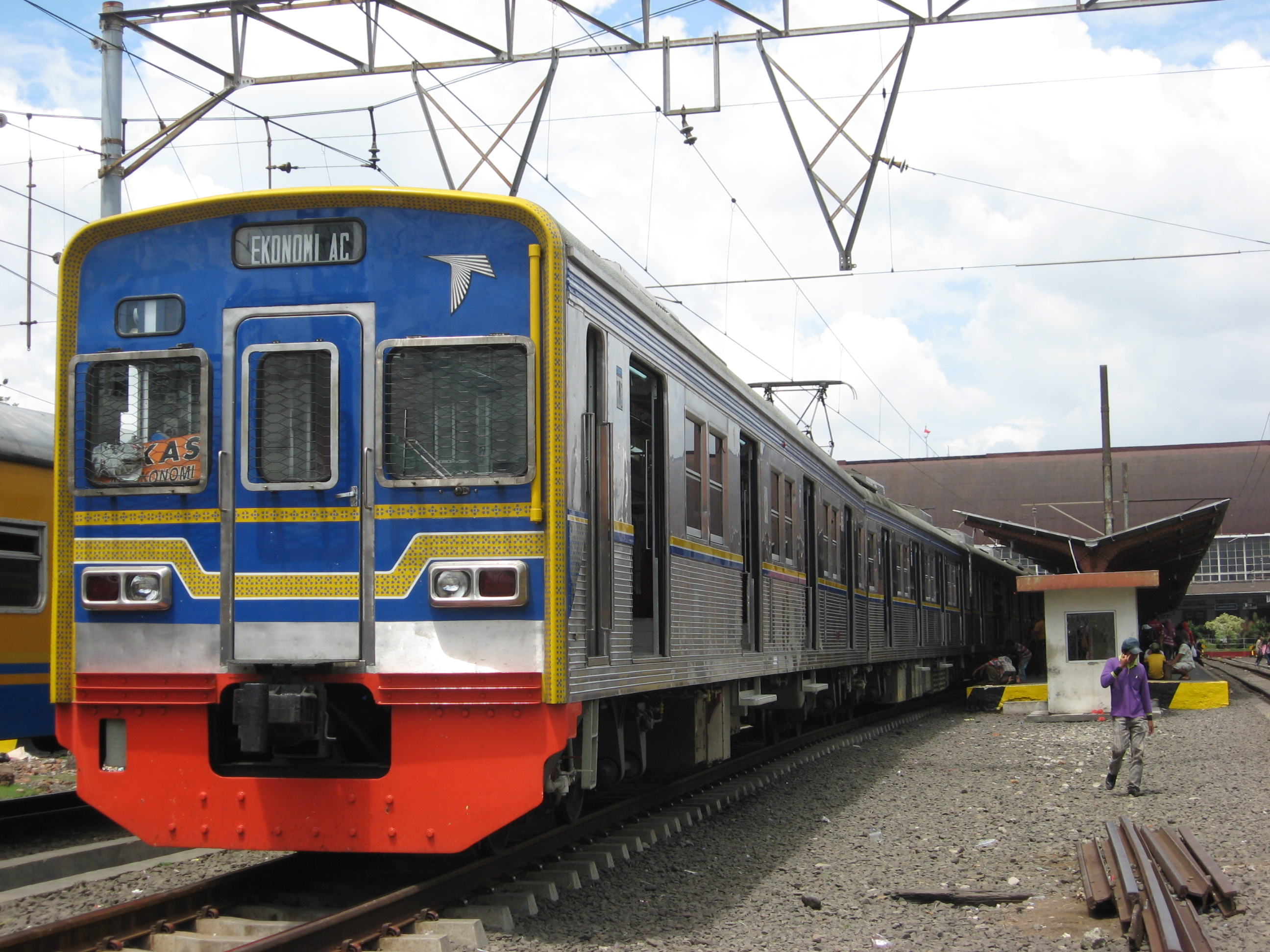
Set 06 operated by KRL Jabotabek in Jakarta, Indonesia in March 2011

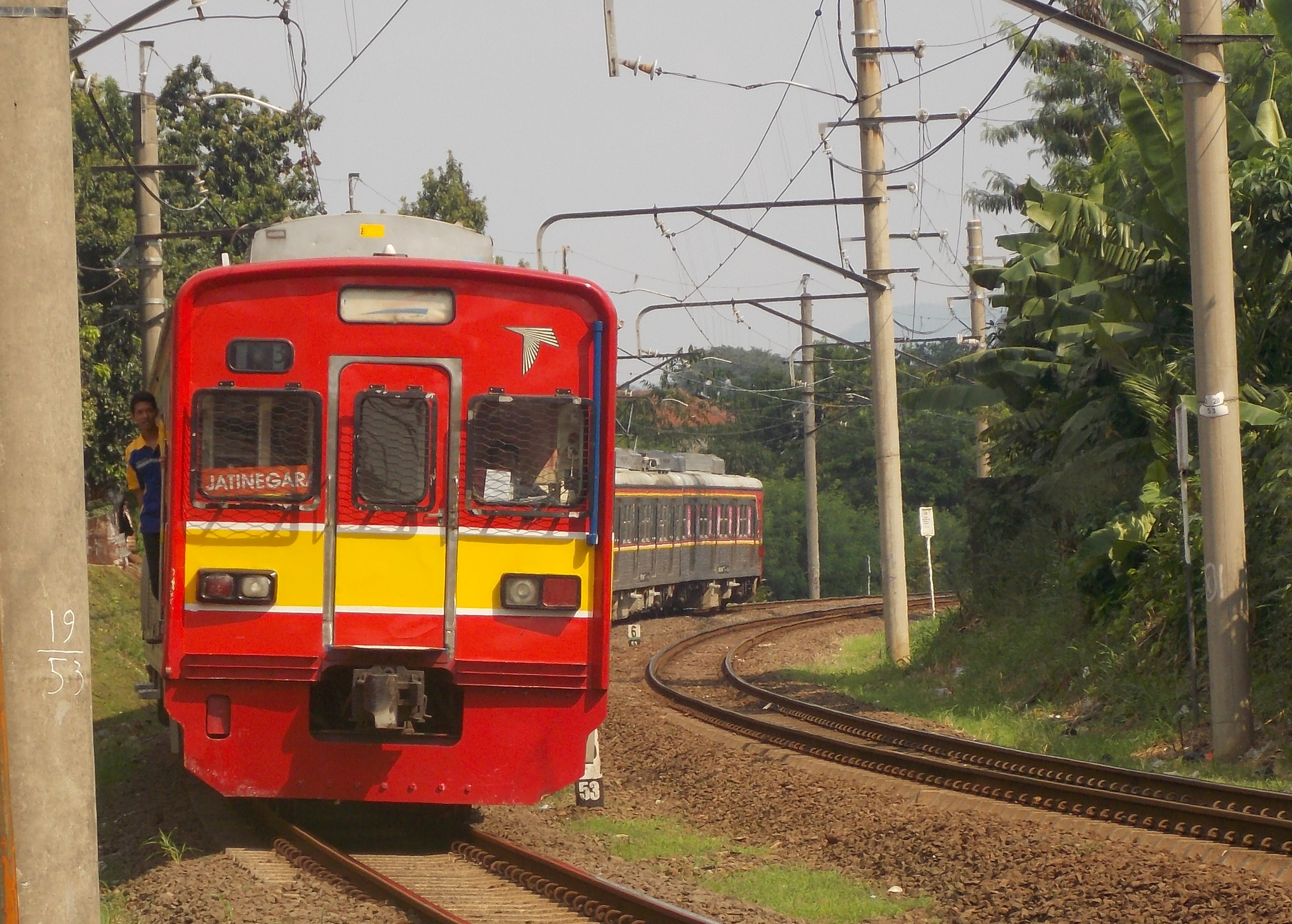
KCJ-paint schemed set 08 in Jakarta, Indonesia in April 2016

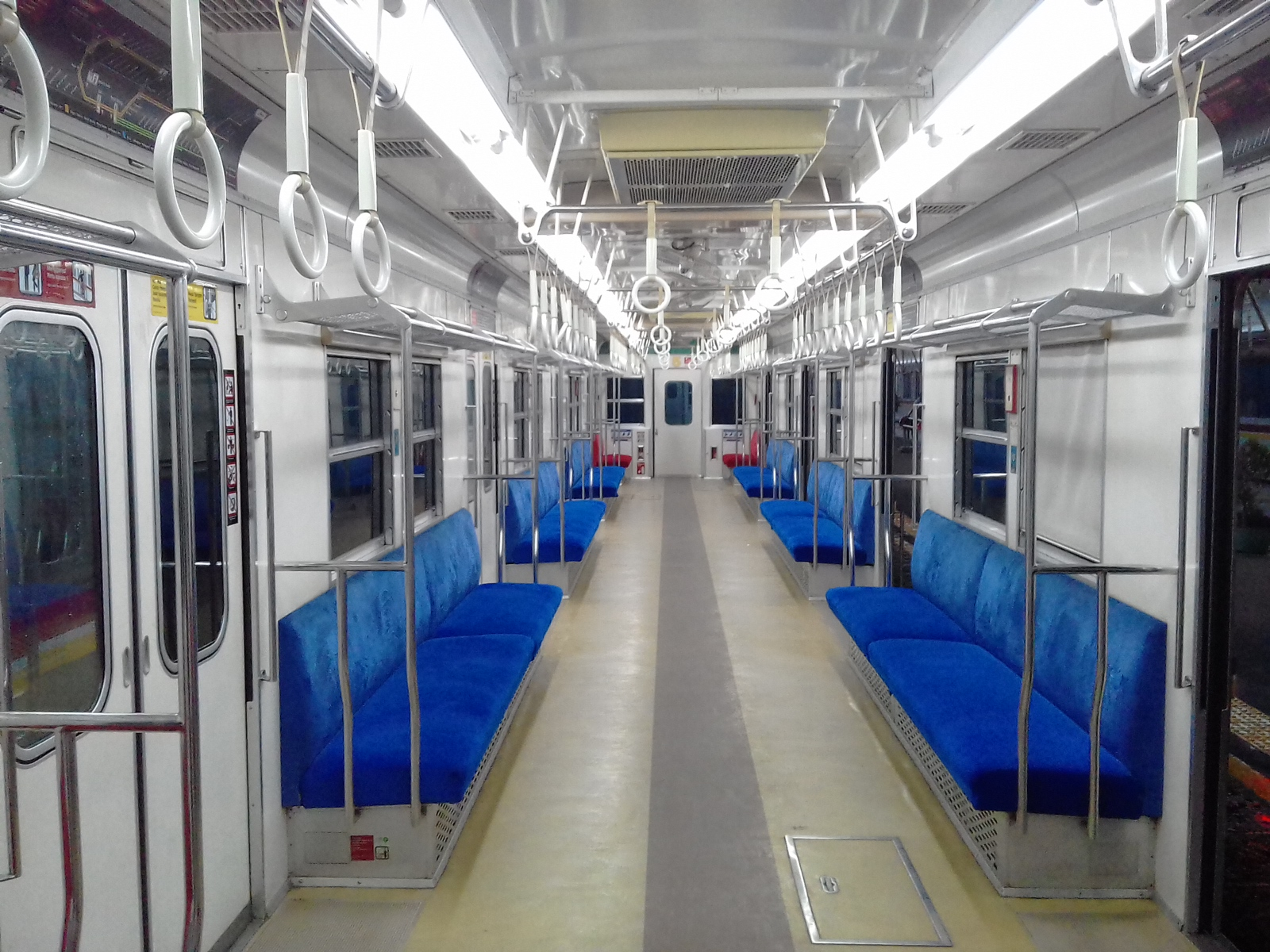
The interior of car 1083 in May 2017

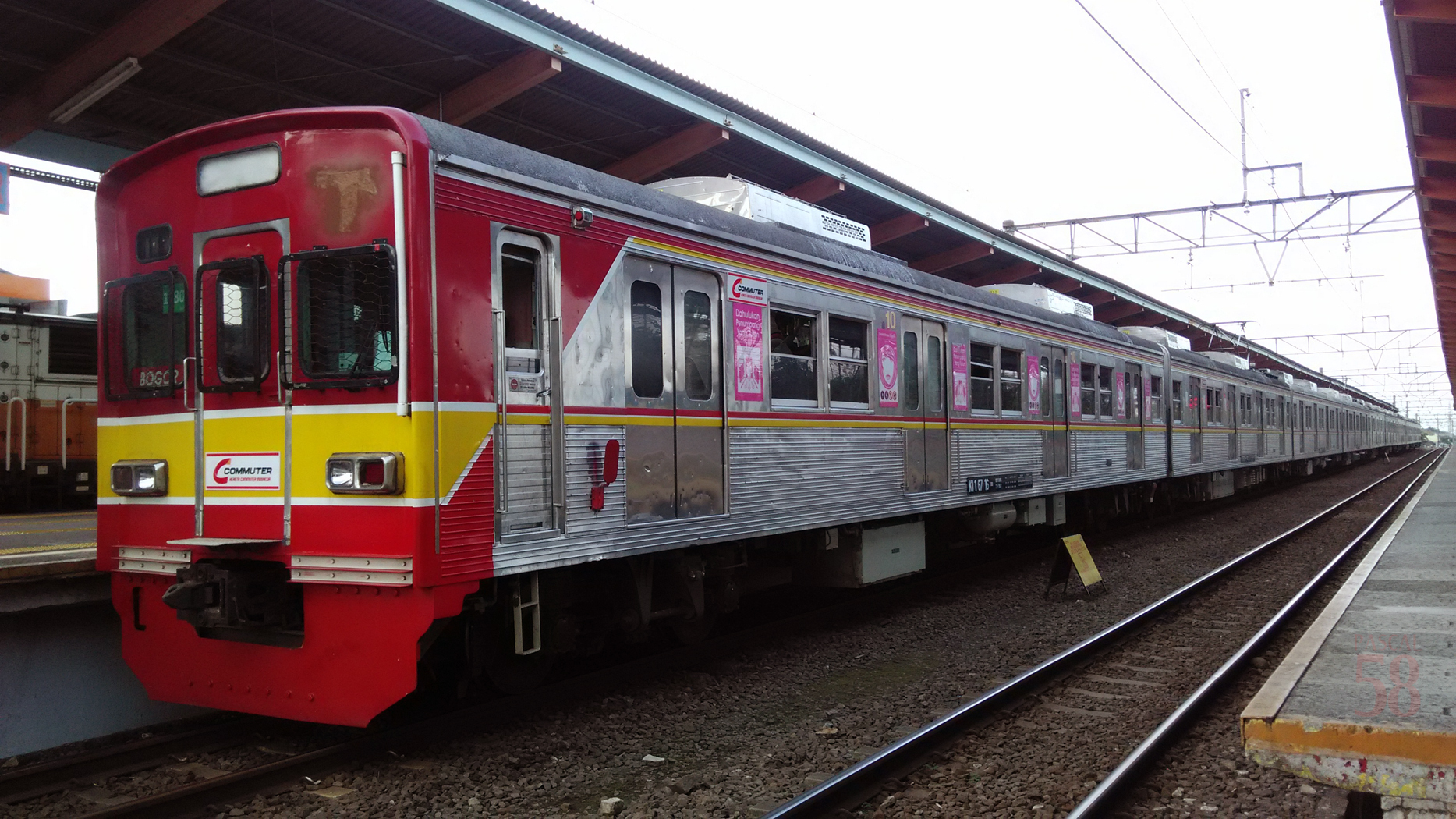
1080 in Depok Station
